= Enemigo íntimo season 1 =

Enemigo íntimo
- Season 1
- Promotional poster
- No. of episodes: 53

Release
- Original network: Telemundo
- Original release: 21 February – 7 May 2018

Season chronology
- Next → Season 2

The first season of the drama television series created by Hubert Barrero Enemigo íntimo premiered on Telemundo on 21 February 2018, at 10.00 pm in the U.S., and concluded on 7 May 2018. It consists of fifty-three episodes, each of approximately 45 minutes.

Enemigo íntimo features a large ensemble cast, including Raúl Méndez, Fernanda Castillo, Matías Novoa, Rafael Sánchez Navarro, Guillermo Quintanilla, Leonardo Daniel, and Otto Sirgo in the starring roles.

== Cast ==
=== Main ===
- Raúl Méndez as Alejandro Ferrer
- Fernanda Castillo as Roxana Rodiles
- Matías Novoa as Daniel Laborde / Eduardo Tapia "El Tilapia"
- Rafael Sánchez Navarro as Leopoldo Borges
- Guillermo Quintanilla as Anselmo López "Guillotina"
- Leonardo Daniel as Commander David Gómez
- Otto Sirgo as Nemesio Rendón
- Alejandro Speitzer as Luis Rendón "El Berebere"
- Armando Hernández as Héctor Fernández "Colmillo"
- Samadhi Zendejas as María Antonia Reyes "Mamba"
- Valentina Acosta as Olivia Reyes
- Itahisa Machado as Marimar Rubio
- Elvira Monsell as Zoraida
- Mayra Rojas as Clarisa
- Alpha Acosta as Minerva Zambrano
- Mar Zamora as Ochún
- María del Carmen Félix as Ana Mercedes Calicio "La Puma"
- Mauricio Rousselon as Robaldo Bolado "El Bowser"
- Natalia Benvenuto as Puki
- Alan Ciangherotti as Bernardo Rendón "El Buitre"
- Tania Niebla as Tamara
- Miguel René Moreno as Lieutenant Gabriel Puenzo
- René García as Priamo Cabrales
- Francisco Calvillo as Rafael Mantilla Moreno "El Patojo"
- Diego Soldano as Federico Montalvo
- Flavio Peniche as Pedro Bencomo Saldivia "Sanson"
- Sandra Benhumea as Lula Pineda
- Rafael Nieves as Lieutenant Carlos Muñán
- Mónica Jiménez as Eladia Cornejo
- Iván Aragón as Juan Romero "El Chamaco"
- Jean Paul Leroux as Ángel Cordero
- Roberto Uscanga as Fermín Pedraza "El Cristero"
- Eduardo Reza as Gibrán Mendiola

== Episodes ==
No. overall	No. in season	Title	Original release date	US viewers (millions)
1	1	"Caminos opuestos"	21 February 2018	1.72
While Alejandro was playing on the outskirts of his house; he hears a cry for help from his younger sister and runs home to see what is happening; this child realizes that his parents were murdered and his sister suddenly disappeared. After twenty-five years; Alejandro becomes a federal police officer and his first objective is to carry out an operation against the drug traffickers that hit the peace of his city. Somewhere else; Adelaide; who is now known as Roxana Rodiles attends a prestigious event in Switzerland. After the death of his wife in the prison guillotine orders his men and the director of the prison to find the person who did it at all costs; or else there will be a war.
2	2	"Alejandro interroga a Roxana"	22 February 2018	1.40
While at her boyfriend's house; Roxana is stopped by the police; while Federico is in charge of leaving through the tunnel of the basement of his house before being captured by the authorities. After the operation Olivia arrives at the room where Alejandro is staying to celebrate this important blow. The next morning; Alejandro meets with Roxana to tell him that she was taken for questioning because of the ties she has with Montalvo and she also needs clarification because she had so much money in her bank accounts. Meanwhile, Borgues and the prison psychologist continue searching for the person who murdered Guillotina's wife; before the expiration of the term that he gave them and take the prison on his own.
3	3	"Una riña sangrienta"	23 February 2018	1.49
In the middle of the operation against the Mexican mafias, Alejandro manages to take with him a subject who calls himself Armando so that they will be given valuable information that will help them to know who are the people who are in charge of the arms shipment that were going to enter the country; meanwhile Roxana asks her cellmate because La Puma acts so violently with the other prisoners. Guillotina orders his men to look for the prison guard and make him pay in a special way the death of Dulcita. The cartel members meet to discuss the arrest of their cargo because of Alejandro Ferrer. After avenging the death of his wife Guillotina orders Zoraida to organize a big party to celebrate this event.
4	4	"Batalla campal"	26 February 2018	1.61
While Alejandro goes to move Pantojo to a new jail; Lieutenant Olivia listens to a strange conversation, which is why she orders her to be traced; because of this; the lieutenant manages to make sure that the professor is going to meet with his partner in a secluded place in a few minutes; and upon hearing this, Alejandro asks his commander to let him be present in this place; for with his own eyes he wants to corroborate that this is true; but when arriving at this site these subjects have prepared an ambush to the authorities. Meanwhile in prison; Guillotina orders one of his men to go for the Guatemalan and have him pay off his debts. Elsewhere Roxana continues to endure the humiliations of Zoraida.
5	5	"El Tilapia arranca su misión"	27 February 2018	1.48
When believing that there is someone from his team that is betraying them, Alejandro talks to the commander to authorize him and put Daniel on trial by sending him to the Dunes so that he can get close to Roxana and get information that will lead them to find the whereabouts of the teacher. Meanwhile, Zoraida calls Roxana to tell her what her price is in exchange for not being the slave of her and Mamba while she remains in jail. Arriving at the Dunes; Daniel meets Guillotina; who tells him that he is the only person who gives the orders in the prison.
6	6	"Roxana atraída por El Tilapia"	28 February 2018	1.56
While in the library, Daniel approaches Roxana to talk to her about why she is imprisoned; for its part; Guillotina say to Orejas that be attentive of all his companions as he must see which is the person who is betraying him. After talking with Roxana, Daniel talks to one of his colleagues and he tells him everything he has had to do to get some drugs. Alejandro tells his boss that he can not continue in the office after what happened outside this building and for this he wants to retire to take some time and rest; while Olivia is responsible for looking for those responsible for the deaths of their peers.
7	7	"Roxana acusada de un incendio"	1 March 2018	1.50
After one of her companions set fire to the laundry room; Roxana is forced to wait among the flames for one of the firemen to give him a package. Later; Roxana is taken to the infirmary where they are waiting for her to deliver the order and to carefully check the laundry room; the inspector tells the director of the prison that all this fire was provoked. Upon hearing what happened to his patient, Marimar decides to visit him in the hospital; which bothers Olivia a lot. Orejas tells Madre that she managed to find out who is the person who has been betraying her.
8	8	"Tilapia mata a un reo"	2 March 2018	1.47
Roxana is called by the directors of the jail for her to tell them who was the person who started the fire in the laundry. Alejandro say to Olivia to check the USB that he managed to find after confronting in the house with his enemies; but when you try to open it, you begin to eliminate all the information it contains. On the other hand; Zoraida tells Mamba that El Profesor sent her a message saying that Roxana was untouchable; but is willing to take the consequences as it will not give a preference treatment to someone who barely knows. Finally; Borges tells Captain Ferrer that his pupil was taken by Guillotina to stab a man; while they are performing the play.
9	9	"Roxana y Tilapia hacen el amor"	5 March 2018	1.54
The head of security at the prison calls Roxana to go back to Zambrano's office; but when going to this place Roxana realizes that she is being deceived by this man. Meanwhile the Colonel is worried about the fate that Alejandro may be running and Olivia and asks his boss to go and look for him as soon as possible. Realizing what the guard is doing to her friend, Ochún decides to intervene before he achieves his goal. Luis asks his dad to trust him and let him finish once and for all with Captain Ferrer; but he asks him to concentrate on finding and ending with the Professor's right hand.
10	10	"Roxana y Ochún son cómplices"	6 March 2018	1.42
After having the conjugal visit, Ochún asks her friend who was the person who spent the night. Meanwhile Silvia Les shows her bosses that she managed to decipher a private chat from the Gardener with a partner called the Pharisee and upon hearing this, Alejandro asks his boss not to detour and authorize the investigation against Priano. Guillotina approaches Tilapia to tell her that she learned about her conjugal visit with the perfumed one and now she wants to know how she did to get this permit. Roxana tells her friend that they must be very aware since the prison's security chief realized that she was the person who helped her and now suspects that she has her wallet.
11	11	"Toman de rehén a Alejandro"	7 March 2018	1.27
After intercepting a call, Silvia discovers that a group is thinking of kidnapping a person; although due to the interference it can not discover who it is. Upon seeing his she friend recovered, Roxana tells him that she is willing to help him get revenge on Bowser. Nemesio asks his son if he is sure to kidnap the teacher's lawyer because he believes that this would bring more problems with his enemies. Guillotina enters the library to tell everyone that he wrote a poem to a woman who got her attention completely. Lula Pineda introduces himself to Alejandro and tells him that he is looking for him since he wants him to give her an interview and clarify how he treats people when he interrogates them.
12	12	"Piden la cabeza de Roxana"	8 March 2018	1.49
Upon hearing of what happened with Roxana's lawyer, Minerva calls her to tell her of his death. Tilapia looks for Madre and asks if she wanted to be killed for doing the job she asked for. Roxana tells Bowser that now that he knows that El Profesor wants her alive, she must take care of herself and avoid hurting her, since otherwise she will pay the consequences, Puma celebrates her exit from the punishment cell. After clarifying things with Tilapia, Madre asks he saw thought the poem that i dedicate to Roxana and wants to know if she could have liked this detail that she did. Alejandro looks for Marimar; but as he follows her he realizes that she also lost her family.
13	13	"Roxana descubre la traición"	9 March 2018	1.24
Ochun's friend tells him that Roxana is the woman of a person with a lot of power and if they finish quickly with this they can charge the big reward, which they are giving for their head. While she is having dinner, Guillotina approaches Roxana to ask her to speak alone in the workshop since she has something very important to tell her. After receiving a call from Silvia, Alejandro arrives at the site of the tragedy and learns that a poster retained some victims and ended up with an establishment to send a message to his enemies. Marimar goes to find the director of the Dunes to deliver his letter of resignation because family reasons must move away from this place. El Tilapia takes a boy to the infirmary after finding him poisoned; But the doctor tells him that it is best not to do anything because he will continue to consume until he dies.
14	14	"Guillotina protege a Roxana"	12 March 2018	1.42
Realizing that Ochun wanted to kill her, Roxana asks him why he betrayed her because he was the only person he trusted and also wants to know why he did not comply with the proposal made to him. Meanwhile, Federico meets with Nemesio Rendón to give him an explanation of why he has not been able to move the money from his bank accounts; and also wants to tell him that he is going through a very difficult economic situation with the death of the lawyer who was going to get his girlfriend out of prison. Alejandro asks Silvia and Olivia to have a lot of discretion because if someone comes to realize that they intervened Priano's office, they could spend many years in jail. After clarifying things with Ochun, Roxana asks who her boyfriend is.
15	15	"Noche de pasión en Las Dunas"	13 March 2018	1.37
Roxana looks for Puma to ask her to take care of her because someone wants to kill her and is willing to negotiate with her in exchange for her protection. Tilapia tells Orejas that he managed to sell all the drugs and already has the money collected to give it to Madre. Alejandro interrogates in his own way the man who kidnaps the girls so he can tell who he is selling them to and if he does not talk he will pay the consequences. After getting information from this guy, Alejandro asks Olivia to send him the satellite map of daisies since he is going to take charge of rescuing the girl who was kidnapped. Lula Pineda goes to Borges's office to ask him to authorize her to meet with Roxana as she wants to personally thank her for the donations made to the different NGOs by her boyfriend.
16	16	"Tilapia confronta a Bowser"	14 March 2018	1.31
After fighting with one of her companions Roxana is taken to an isolation cell; but when she sees Bowser she implores the rest of the guards to take her out of the cell since this man could cause her a lot of damage. Upon leaving prison, Lula meets Alejandro and tells him that his friend Borges is making a very serious mistake sending an innocent person to an isolation cell and after this little conversation, Alejandro asks his friend to take charge to make an appointment with Orejas because he needs to get information from the girl they stole, to avoid at all costs being sold to the network for which he works. Daniel meets with his captain and demands an explanation of why Roxana was sent to one of the worst places in the Dunes.
17	17	"Guillotina visita a Roxana"	15 March 2018	1.42
Guillotina looks for Borges to tell him where Roxana is hiding because she needs him to do her a very special favor or else she will set up a new scandal in every corner of the prison. Luis looks for his dad to ask for an apology for his behavior and also wants him to reconsider and think about taking the place of the Professor. When meeting with Guillotina, Roxana implores to him that it helps her to leave the cell of punishment since it does not hold a second more than to be locked in this place. Alejandro meets with Orejas to tell him that he managed to negotiate five years less of his sentence in exchange for obtaining the information he needs to be able to rescue the girl that his group stole.
18	18	"Roxana confronta a Alejandro"	16 March 2018	1.46
After suffering a series of hallucinations, Roxana thinks about changing her attitude to leave the punishment cell with her head held high. For his part, Alejandro is looking for Marimar in his new job to ask him to speak because he needs to ask for an apology for having sent her to investigate and others want to ask him to leave work at the school so that he can return to the Dunas. After talking to his doctor, Alejandro looks for Borges to ask him in a special way to get Roxana out of the punishment cell as he is running out of time to find the Professor's whereabouts. Lula tells her assistant that she is going to take charge of looking for Sergio Olivia so that he will give her all the information he needs about the captain Ferrer; while Daniel thinks about how to deliver a letter to Roxana.
19	19	"Roxana sale de Las Dunas"	19 March 2018	1.43
When leaving the punishment cell, Roxana asks Puma to go to the visiting room because she has a surprise prepared for her and when she goes to this place she is reunited with her mother whom she has not seen since she was locked in the Dunes. Orejas looks for his partner El Gato to tell him not to think that he will be on his side now that they are in the same jail since he must pay for everything he has done. Alejandro is looking for Sergio to tell him that he is in the midst of a very important investigation and for this he needs your help since Lula wants to destroy him as he likes. After seeing his mother, Mamba thanks Roxana for giving him this surprise and now wants to tell him that he counts his absolute fidelity while he remains in jail.
20	20	"Roxana se enfrenta a Zoraida"	20 March 2018	1.56
After receiving a call from the group of the dark, Alejandro together with Borges create a plan to rescue Olivia from their hands without having to meet any of their demands. Later, Alejandro seeks help from one of his superiors, since he wants to tell him that Cabrales is hiding something and that is why he wants me to tell him what information this guy requested and while he is working, Silvia manages to hear a very important call from Cabrales. Olivia meets with Marimar to tell her that she has a relationship with Alejandro for a couple of years and that is why she wants her to not interfere in this matter. Zoraida asks Roxana to take the risk of playing with her as she did before going to jail, since she wants to show them what it is made of.
21	21	"Sacan a La Puma del reclusorio"	21 March 2018	1.52
La Puma is taken to an office where she is face to face with Captain Alejandro; who tells him to call her because she needs your help to return to Mexico City and put him in contact with the people so that she worked and after listening to him Puma tells Roxana the proposal that Ferrer made him and Roxana asks him to accept this deal so they could take revenge on him. The Colonel meets with Puenzo to tell him that they are very grateful to him for having intervened in the rescue of Olivia and for this from now on he will be in charge of fighting the group of the Dark Ones. Guillotina sends for El Chamaco to entrust him with a very special task.
22	22	"Visita conyugal con Guillotina"	22 March 2018	1.49
After receiving a strong beating from Zoraida and her group, Roxana meets with Tilapia to ask her to help her manage a conjugal visit with Guillotina since her life is in danger if it does not protect her. Upon returning to prison Puma learns that Zoraida attacked her friends and now she wonders how they are going to defend themselves against these women. Priano communicates with Nemesio to tell him that he was able to corroborate the information he asked about Tilapia; although he has suspicions that something very important hides this subject and now they should check if he is really a good football player. Puma looks for Roxana and asks her to change her way of being with Cubana since she must teach him a lesson after what I try to do to her or else nobody will join her army.
23	23	"Tilapia se desquita con Bowser"	23 March 2018	1.29
While the party is being held between inmates and guardians, Roxana asks Puma to save her gun since she only wants to give Ochun a message. In the meantime, Daniel is taken to a punishment cell and Puma questions Roxana for having forgiven La Cubana's life since everyone will lose the respect she has won, including her own. Mamba looks for Bowser so that he can give him information about why the Puma was taken from the prison and in return they will make a deal with mutual benefit. Alejandro communicates with the commander to tell him that he will meet with the witness to give him the information they need about the Tijuana cartel; but just as he is about to enter the hotel, Captain Ferrer sees him fall from the balcony of his room.
24	24	"Roxana y Tilapia a escondidas"	26 March 2018	1.34
Guillotina orders one of the guards to take everyone out of the library so he can talk to Roxana an alone and she takes advantage of the situation to ask her lover to get her heroin, since one of her friends needs her very urgently. Alejandro goes to Lula Pineda's office to say that he is very sorry if he does not like the methods he uses to get information; but this one tells him that she knows that he is like that since he knows the story that he had to live from when he was little. Marimar looks for Alejandro to tell him everything he could talk with Roxana. The guard looks for her boss to tell her what the perfumed Tamara was able to do and is sure that every day he is gaining more ground with the other inmates since none was able to say what had really happened.
25	25	"Madre recibe la orden"	27 March 2018	1.29
La Puma is taken to an office where she is face to face with Captain Alejandro; who tells him to call her because she needs your help to return to Mexico City and put him in contact with the people so that she worked and after listening to him Puma tells Roxana the proposal that Ferrer made him and Roxana asks him to accept this deal so they could take revenge on him. El Coronel meets with Puenzo to tell him that they are very grateful to him for having intervened in the rescue of Olivia and for this from now on he will be in charge of fighting the group of the Dark Ones. Guillotina sends for El Chamaco to entrust him with a very special task
26	26	"Tilapia derrota a Guillotina"	28 March 2018	1.45
Madre sends Tilapia to the center of the prison so that everyone can witness her confrontation with this subject; but just at that moment Borges asks Bowser to take over his office to Tilapia as soon as possible. Elsewhere, Olivia goes to Priano's house to find out if he could communicate with Nemesio. Fang tells Madre that she needs to show him a message from her bosses before she confronts Tilapia; but after reading it Mother ignores this and while these fight Roxana together with her companions look with great expectation this unexpected confrontation. The commander and Alejandro visit Priano to tell him that the doctors authorized the transfer to his home but he takes advantage of the moment to tell the two who are in charge of destroying them for contempt of justice.
27	27	"Roxana es hija de Don Nemesio"	29 March 2018	1.49
Alejandro is responsible for following the car that is moving to Roxana, he realizes that something unexpected happened; due to this the officer communicates with Olivia to tell him what happened and now he needs your help to know his location. Meanwhile in the prison, Bowser tells the director of the Dunes that they are in serious trouble as the inmates are taking control of the prison by orders of Guillotina who is furious at the unexpected departure of his wife. When she reunites with her father and her brother, Roxana feels very moved by the plan they carried out; but she tells them that she does not want things to be that way since she is not willing to be a fugitive; he has many plans to carry out and wants to start reactivating the business of emeralds in Africa.
28	28	"Roxana y Tilapia se mienten"	30 March 2018	1.29
Upon learning that Roxana voluntarily returned to prison, her friends are the first to receive her and tell her everything that happened in the men's yard because of her sudden departure. Meanwhile, Alejandro asks Borges what conditions Roxana arrived at and when he heard about his re-entry to prison, he tells his friend that he is not willing to wait a second longer to talk to her and to accept talking to the Roxana officers. She tells them that she was kidnapped by some subjects who wanted to ask them some questions about the poster thousand summits. After speaking with the inmate, Alejandro will ask Marimar if she is willing to spend the night with him because he needs help to forget all the problems he is going through.
29	29	"Borges cae por orden de Roxana"	2 April 2018	1.41
Borges and Minerva have a tragic accident, he dies and she is in a coma. Alejandro is outraged by the announcement of the immediate replacement, because even the chief judge is fighting for his life.
30	30	"Madre ve a Roxana con Daniel"	3 April 2018	1.33
When she realizes that Zoraida wants to put all her companions against him, Roxana approaches her and asks her to solve only the problems they have between them; but Zoraida takes advantage of this moment to threaten her with a weapon and just at that moment Guillotina appears and demands that this woman release her immediately or else she will listen to the consequences. Elsewhere the informant of the cartel returns to the neighborhood of Tilapia and realizes that everything he was led to believe was a trap and because of this situation, he calls his boss to tell him what happened; and when listening to this conversation Alejandro asks Silvia to take charge of preventing Priano from making calls from his cell phone; while he thinks of a plan that can prevent Daniel from being in danger of death.
31	31	"El Bere Bere visita a Roxana"	4 April 2018	1.52
Luis, disguised, mocks the prison authorities to enter Las Dunas and declares in rebellion against Roxana. Convinced by Orejas, Daniel apologizes to Guillotina, on his knees.
32	32	"Tilapia sonsaca a Roxana"	5 April 2018	1.48
Daniel seduces Rodiles to get information about Borges' death. She does not loose pledge, calls him "Chivato" and accuses Guillotina of the crime. Alejandro goes for Sansón.
33	33	"Desafío sexual para Daniel"	6 April 2018	1.28
Guillotina orders Daniel to have a conjugal date with Clarisa so he can forget Roxana. Rodiles does not want him to lend himself to the game. Lula looks for El Gato to sink Ferrer and she almost gets raped.
34	34	"Los Oscuros matan a Príamo"	9 April 2018	1.49
While taking a shower, an intruder from El Cristero, kills Príamo, an ally of Los Mil Cumbres and makes it look like suicide. Roxana convinces Madre not to compete with Tilapia.
35	35	"Roxana ya no tiene aliado"	10 April 2018	1.47
The move of Nemesio to get Roxana out of Las Dunas, comes to the ground with the death of Príamo. Now they must put together another strategy. Rodiles is the forbidden apple of Tilapia.
36	36	"Ferrer es inhabilitado"	11 April 2018	1.33
Not knowing that Alejandro is her brother, Roxana affirms that the agent tortured her. As a result, they take away his investiture and force him to declare. Madre despairs for the love of Rodiles.
37	37	"Matan a Marimar como venganza"	12 April 2018	1.32
Alejandro insists on investigating the narcos and Los Mil Cumbres take revenge on him by killing the psychologist. Roxana and Daniel dance together, secretly. Rodiles cancels the escape plan.
38	38	"Tilapia mata a Bowser"	13 April 2018	1.37
In a fight, Tilapia deals a mortal blow to the chief of custody and disposes of the corpse. Everything begins, after discussing about the true identity of Daniel. Roxana sends Ochún out of his cell.
39	39	"Ferrer descubre la verdad"	16 April 2018	1.54
Sansón confesses that Guillotina slaughtered the parents of Captain Ferrer and Nemesio took his sister to sell her in the United States. Tilapia does not want to leave Las Dunas without Roxana. They kill the Turco.
40	40	"Tilapia mata a otro recluso"	17 April 2018	1.46
By order of Guillotina, they try to assassinate Daniel, Colmillo escapes and Kraken dies of a knife in the neck. Ochún could not finish with Roxana. La Mamba, his accomplice is stabbed by La Puma.
41	41	"Madre intenta violar a Roxana"	18 April 2018	1.64
Roxana wants to know why she has nightmares with Madre; she takes advantage to force her to have sex; but she kicks her out. Buitre wants Ferrer and kidnaps the Puenzo family for that.
42	42	"Roxana ordena matar a Madre"	19 April 2018	1.64
Zoraida and Roxana make a pact: if the head of the inmates kills Guillotina, Rodiles' contacts will help her to go to jail. Nemesio threatens Madre, for messing with his daughter.
43	43	"Ochún no puede matar a Roxana"	20 April 2018	1.46
La Cubana commits suicide and dies because of the explosion she prepared, to blow Roxana to pieces and avenge the death of her boyfriend, El Turco. The Buitre attacks Ferrer.
44	44	"Tilapia apuñala a Guillotina"	23 April 2018	1.61
Upon hearing some shots, Alejandro leaves the house of Marimar and realizes that she was seriously injured. Madre looks for Roxana to ask who she really is because she knows that the helicopter that was around the prison tried to take her away. Ochun tells her companions that she heard that they murdered the prison psychologist. Nemesio orders his son to finish the party he organized because he is only interested in ending the captain. Later, Alejandro meets with his companions and Olivia tells him that the person who murdered Marimar was El Buitre one of the most important assassins of the cartel Mil Cumbres. Roxana communicates with her brother to entrust a very special task that allows them to capture the dark once and for all and Bowser learns that his family went to visit him.
45	45	"Los reos amenazan a Tilapia"	24 April 2018	1.49
After the unexpected attack of El Cholo, Alejandro communicates with the commander to tell him that this guy escaped. After discovering Clariza, sculpting her belongings, Roxana tells her that this will be the last time she will share a cell with her and from now on she will have to treat her with as much respect as possible. Meanwhile, Sergio Olivia arrives at the place where the attack was presented against the police, but while talking to an officer he receives a message warning him to stop investigating what happened. After talking with Daniel, Alejandro tells his boss that apparently he is in love with Roxana and that is why he insists on his innocence by heart and sword. When getting to speak with the director of the jail, Guillotina achieves its intentions.
46	46	"Roxana y Tilapia en libertad"	25 April 2018	1.52
While Alejandro is responsible for following the car that is moving to Roxana, he realizes that something unexpected happened; due to this the officer communicates with Olivia to tell him what happened and now he needs your help to know his location. Meanwhile in the prison, Bowser tells the director of the Dunes that they are in serious trouble as the inmates are taking control of the prison by orders of Guillotina who is furious at the unexpected departure of his wife. When she reunites with her father and her brother, Roxana feels very moved by the plan they carried out; but she tells them that she does not want things to be that way since she is not willing to be a fugitive; he has many plans to carry out and wants to start reactivating the business of emeralds in Africa.
47	47	"Daniel abandona la misión"	27 April 2018	1.41
Luis is in charge of setting up the operation to capture El Turco. Meanwhile, Alejandro asks Sanzon if he remembers what he did to his family thirty years ago and also wants to ask him where his sister is and who were the people with whom I carry out this crime. Roxana communicates with her dad to find out how her brother went and also wants to ask her to talk to Zoraida so that she does not try to do any kind of damage. Clarisa looks for her boss to ask her for a dose of drugs and in return she will give him very important information. Roxana tells Ochún what happened with her boyfriend and also wants to tell her that she no longer has any kind of grudge against her.
48	48	"Daniel en los Mil Cumbres"	30 April 2018	1.49
The Cartel of the Mil Cumbres and its partners, headed by Roxana, define the new strategy: to move from drug trafficking to diamonds. Daniel faces the Bere Bere. Puenzo kills El Buitre.
49	49	"Daniel no coopera con Ferrer"	1 May 2018	1.40
Ferrer wants to use Daniel as a bait to catch Rodiles, but Laborde refuses. He tells him that he is not the same anymore. The real estate business will serve the Mil Cumbres Cartel to launder money.
50	50	"Daniel traiciona a Roxana"	2 May 2018	1.58
Roxana tells Daniel that he went to do very important business but still can not tell him anything since it is not convenient for him to know everything he does. For his part, Alejandro remembers what he had to live when he was little and wonders where his sister may be. In prison the Puma is again locked in the punishment cell and Eladia offers better conditions in exchange for a little money. Elsewhere, Guillotina begins to improve and thinks about how he can escape from the hospital without being seen by the custodians. Silvia tells Alejandro that she was able to find out that Roxana and Daniel entered with false passports into the United States, which they can use in their favor to catch them once and for all.
51	51	"Roxana acaba con Las Dunas"	3 May 2018	1.46
After the attack that some officers suffered, Alejandro communicates with Daniel to ask him if he is involved in this matter; but after hanging up this call Daniel realizes that his brother-in-law was watching him. In another place, Guillotina manages to leave the hospital; but when realizing that this subject escaped the custodians call to the captain Ferrer to tell him what happened and because of this, Alejandro is in charge of putting together a plan to capture him. Seeing the news Daniel asks his wife if she was the person who ordered to kill the people who were chasing them. While he drinks, Luis remembers the last conversation he had with his wife and Olivia tells Alejandro that she is not willing to be separated from him again.
52	52	"Guillotina contra Mil Cumbres"	4 May 2018	1.42
Upon discovering that Puenzo cheated on them, the commander told him about the operation they were going to carry out to stop Fermin because they needed his help for this. Meanwhile Olivia manages to get the video from the hotel security camera and realizes that Daniel did not kill his companions; but seeing the tape Alejandro tells everyone that for him this became a traitor. After the talk he had with his girlfriend, Daniel communicates with his dad to tell him that he is fine and hopes that they will see each other soon. When he meets with Roxana, Frank he proposes to help him finance his career as President of the United States. Elsewhere, Guillotina begins to improve and thinks about how he can escape from the hospital without being seen by the custodians.
53	53	"Llega El Profesor"	7 May 2018	1.63
When faced with Captain Ferrer, Daniel tells him that he is willing to die before giving him information that leads him to find Roxana's whereabouts; but when he hears this, he tells him that he wants to give him one last chance and for this he needs to know where they are going to put the drug into the United States. Nemesio asks his daughter to leave the ranch since Guillotina can arrive at any time. Alejandro asks Olivia to take charge of getting as many men as possible as he is going to put together an operation to capture the head of the Miil Cumbres cartel. Guillotina gathers its people to tell them about the plan they are going to carry out before entering the Rendón house.
