= Enemigo íntimo season 2 =

2020 American television season

Enemigo íntimo
- Season 2
- No. of episodes: 60

Release
- Original network: Telemundo
- Original release: 22 June – 21 September 2020

Season chronology
- ← Previous; Season 1

The second season of Enemigo íntimo is an American crime drama television series written by Lina Uribe and Darío Vanegas and developed by Telemundo Global Studios and Argos Comunicación.

The season was originally scheduled to premiere in April 2020, on the basic cable network Telemundo, but this was postponed indefinitely due to the COVID-19 pandemic. On 13 May 2020, it was confirmed that the series will premiere on 22 June 2020. The season concluded on 21 September 2020.

== Cast and characters ==
=== Main ===
- Raúl Méndez as Alejandro Ferrer
- Fernanda Castillo as Roxana Rodiles "El Profesor"
- Aitor Luna as Martín Ustariz
- Irán Castillo as Carmen Govea
- Manuel Ojeda as Don Jesús Padilla
- María del Carmen Félix as Ana Mercedes Calicio "La Puma"
- Elyfer Torres as Alicia García
- Luis Alberti as Javier Rivera
- Tiago Correa as Diego Lozano
- Germán Bracco as Manuel Salas
- Amaranta Ruiz as Gladys Bernal "La Mariscala"
- Erick Chapa as Arturo Morillo
- Yuvanna Montalvo as Karla Padilla
- Arturo García Tenorio as Díaz
- Claudette Maillé as Elisa Torres
- Héctor Kotsifakis as Héctor Moreno "El Sargento"
- Ruy Senderos as Ricardo Medina
- Julio Casado as Raúl Ortega "El Habanero"
- Jorge Gallegos as Alan Rodríguez
- Luis Zahera as El Gallego
- Tony Plana as Santilla

=== Guest stars ===
- Matías Novoa as Daniel Laborde / Eduardo Tapia "El Tilapia"
- Alejandro Speitzer as Luis Rendón "El Berebere"
- Leonardo Daniel as Commander David Gómez

== Production ==
On 7 May 2018, Telemundo confirmed that the show has been renewed for a second season. The production of the second season began on 9 September 2019. On 13 December 2019, People en Español confirmed the season's cast, which features actors who appeared in the previous season and new inclusions. Unlike the first season, Matías Novoa will only have a special participation, due to his short time to record the season and El Señor de los Cielos.

== Episodes ==
No. overall	No. in season	Title (Note: The titles and air date of each episode are obtained through the DirecTV guide in English. For a comprehensive record you can visit the NBC page.)	Original release date	US viewers (millions)
54	1	"Obsesión"	22 June 2020	0.96
55	2	"La trampa"	23 June 2020	0.82
56	3	"Cooperación internacional"	24 June 2020	0.90
57	4	"La más buscada"	25 June 2020	0.81
58	5	"Vía de escape"	26 June 2020	0.71
59	6	"Llegó la hora"	29 June 2020	0.80
60	7	"El poder tras las rejas"	30 June 2020	0.81
61	8	"Motín en Las Dunas"	1 July 2020	0.84
62	9	"Visita relámpago"	2 July 2020	0.68
63	10	"Una brillante idea"	6 July 2020	0.82
64	11	"Luz verde"	7 July 2020	0.67
65	12	"La enviada"	8 July 2020	0.77
66	13	"El enlace"	9 July 2020	0.77
67	14	"La misión de Alicia"	13 July 2020	0.75
68	15	"El alcance del negocio"	14 July 2020	0.70
69	16	"El gran golpe"	15 July 2020	0.70
70	17	"Se desata la guerra"	16 July 2020	0.68
71	18	"Veinticuatro horas para matar"	20 July 2020	0.71
72	19	"La revancha"	21 July 2020	0.86
73	20	"La confesión"	22 July 2020	0.84
74	21	"Siembra la droga"	23 July 2020	0.82
75	22	"Alejandro es el blanco"	24 July 2020	0.61
76	23	"Es el gran día"	27 July 2020	0.91
77	24	"Maniobras"	28 July 2020	0.72
78	25	"Directo al matadero"	29 July 2020	0.69
79	26	"A pedir de boca"	30 July 2020	0.79
80	27	"El traidor"	31 July 2020	0.69
81	28	"La entrega"	3 August 2020	0.75
82	29	"Engaño"	4 August 2020	0.75
83	30	"Una noche fuera del negocio"	5 August 2020	0.81
84	31	"A cualquier precio"	6 August 2020	0.76
85	32	"Tras la pista del soplón"	7 August 2020	0.76
86	33	"Juego de poder"	10 August 2020	0.95
87	34	"La trampa"	11 August 2020	0.85
88	35	"Ruta de escape"	12 August 2020	0.90
89	36	"El secuestro"	13 August 2020	0.85
90	37	"El teléfono es clave"	14 August 2020	0.73
91	38	"Alicia como espía"	17 August 2020	0.82
92	39	"Olor a muerte"	18 August 2020	0.84
93	40	"El dato"	19 August 2020	0.80
94	41	"La prueba del delito"	21 August 2020	0.80
95	42	"Al filo de la muerte"	24 August 2020	0.77
96	43	"Pesca en río revuelto"	25 August 2020	0.87
97	44	"Encadenado"	26 August 2020	1.00
98	45	"El nuevo orden en Las Dunas"	28 August 2020	0.79
99	46	"El negocio se viene abajo"	1 September 2020	0.74
100	47	"Contrareloj"	2 September 2020	0.80
101	48	"Rodeados"	3 September 2020	0.77
102	49	"Todos contra Los Zopilotes"	4 September 2020	0.85
103	50	"La ruta del Cóndor"	7 September 2020	0.79
104	51	"Inyección mortal"	8 September 2020	0.84
105	52	"A la cama con Don Jesús"	9 September 2020	0.72
106	53	"La otra salida"	10 September 2020	0.93
107	54	"El negocio apesta"	11 September 2020	0.79
108	55	"La lista de los 123"	14 September 2020	0.74
109	56	"Explota el escándalo"	15 September 2020	0.85
110	57	"Relevo en Los Mil Cumbres"	16 September 2020	0.87
111	58	"El error de Díaz"	17 September 2020	0.97
112	59	"El traslado"	18 September 2020	0.92
113	60	"El intercambio"	21 September 2020	1.19
