= Cabo (TV series) =

2022–2023 Mexican telenovela

- Genre: Telenovela
- Based on: Tú o nadie by María Zarattini
- Developed by: José Alberto Castro; Carlos Daniel González; Vanessa Varela; Fernando Garcilita
- Directed by: Salvador Garcini; Fez Noriega
- Starring: Bárbara de Regil; Matías Novoa; Eva Cedeño; Diego Amozurrutia; Rebecca Jones; Rafael Inclán
- Theme music composer: Diego Amozurrutia; José Benjamín Pérez; Miky Mendoza; Oscar Mont
- Opening theme: "Tú" by Melissa Robles
- Composers: Armando López; Berenice González; Claudia Cabrera
- Country of origin: Mexico
- Original language: Spanish
- No. of seasons: 1
- No. of episodes: 85

Production
- Executive producer: José Alberto Castro
- Producers: Ernesto Hernández; Fausto Sainz
- Editors: Juan Ordóñez; Héctor Flores; Arturo Rodríguez
- Production company: TelevisaUnivision

Original release
- Network: Las Estrellas
- Release: 24 October 2022 – 17 February 2023

Cabo is a Mexican telenovela produced by José Alberto Castro for TelevisaUnivision. It is based on the 1985 Mexican telenovela Tú o nadie created by María Zarattini. It aired on Las Estrellas from 24 October 2022 to 17 February 2023. The series stars Bárbara de Regil and Matías Novoa.

== Plot ==
Hours after Sofía and Alejandro's wedding, he leaves to attend to a business matter and dies in a plane crash. Devastated, Sofía travels to Cabo to meet her in-laws. When Sofía arrives, she is reunited with Alejandro, who is alive, and discovers that he is not the man she fell in love with. Alejandro reveals to her that his name is actually Eduardo and that he changed it so that she would be legally married to his brother, who was the one who died in the accident, and so that together they can inherit his fortune.

Sofía refuses to go along with Eduardo's plans, who now threatens to put her father in jail because he has incriminated him of being responsible for the accident in which Alejandro died. Everything takes an unexpected turn when the real Alejandro returns home, unharmed from the accident and is surprised to have a wife he remembers nothing about. Sofía will be forced to continue with the farce and eventually falls in love with the real Alejandro.

== Cast ==
- Bárbara de Regil as Sofía Chávez
- Matías Novoa as Alejandro Noriega
- Eva Cedeño as Isabela Escalante
- Diego Amozurrutia as Eduardo Torres
- Rebecca Jones as Lucía de Noriega (episodes 1–50)
- Rafael Inclán as Alfonso "Poncho" Chávez
- Mar Contreras as Vanesa Noriega
- Roberto Ballesteros as Fausto Cabrera
- Fabiola Campomanes as Malena Sánchez
- María Chacón as Rebeca Chávez
- Arlette Pacheco as Guadalupe Gutiérrez
- Raúl Coronado as Alan Ortega
- Carlos Athié as Ernesto Castillo
- Bárbara Torres as Carmen Pérez
- Gonzalo Vega Jr. as Luis Sánchez
- Markin López as Álvaro Ruíz
- Sofia Rivera Torres as Karen Escalante
- Lorena Sevilla as Blanquita Cabrera
- Felicia Mercado as Jimena Manrique
- Sergio Klainer as Hugo Reyes
- Fernando Robles as Ulises
- Christian de la Campa as Maximiliano "Max"
- Rafael Novoa as Miguel Cantú
- Azela Robinson as Lucía de Noriega (episodes 51–85)

== Production ==
In May 2022, it was reported that it was reported that José Alberto Castro would be producing a new version of the 1985 telenovela Tú o nadie. On 6 July 2022, Bárbara de Regil was announced in the lead role. On 14 July 2022, an extensive cast list was published by People en Español. Filming began on 18 July 2022. The first teaser of the series was shown on 25 September 2022.

== Episodes ==
No.	Title	Original release date	Mexico viewers (millions)
1	"¿Prometes amarlo por el resto de tus días?"	24 October 2022 (Note: Will premiere early online through Las Estrellas website on 21 October 2022.)	3.2
Alejandro has a confrontation with Eduardo and asks him not to work behind his back. Sofía gets ready for her wedding with "Alejandro". Eduardo makes Isabela jealous when she learns that Alejandro is going on a business trip. Isabela believes that Alejandro is hiding something from her and that is why he has not formalized their relationship. Eduardo sets a trap for his brother. Sofía marries "Alejandro" and he takes her to see their new home. Alejandro goes on a business trip, but during the trip the plane has a mechanical failure. Eduardo informs his mother that Alejandro died.
2	"¿Quién es esa mujer?"	25 October 2022	3.2
Lucía calls Sofía to inform her that Alejandro died. Lucía asks her family to meet Alejandro's wife before making any judgments. Vanessa informs Isabela that Alejandro got married in secret. Lucía suffers a crisis when she enters Alejandro's room and assures Eduardo that Alejandro was the best son. Sofía and Rebeca arrive at Alejandro's house and Lucía reveals to them that he was one of the richest men in the country. Alejandro wakes up in a hospital. Lucía wants to know about Alejandro's love story with Sofía. Eduardo visits Alfonso and reveals his real name and threatens him.
3	"Me enamoré de una mentira"	26 October 2022	3.4
Sofía is surprised to see "Alejandro", he reveals to Sofía that his name is Eduardo and that Alejandro is his stepbrother. Isabela and Vanesa insult Rebeca, but she defends herself. Eduardo threatens Sofía with accusing her of planning Alejandro's death since he has proof that her father was on his brother's plane. Alejandro returns home, shocking his family. Alejandro learns that he secretly married and asks to see his wife. Lucía tells Eduardo that Alejandro has temporary amnesia.
4	"Para mí es una extraña"	27 October 2022	3.1
Sofía tries to tell Alejandro the truth, but Eduardo prevents her. Lucía begs Isabela to respect Alejandro's wife. Isabela kisses Alejandro without caring that Sofía is present, Alejandro puts a stop to Isabela. Sofía and Rebeca realize that Karen is interested in Eduardo. Alejandro asks Sofía to tell him how they met, she tells him that it was at the restaurant where she worked, Alejandro tries to give her a kiss to remember their relationship.
5	"No hay nada más hermoso que verte"	28 October 2022	3.0
Sofía asks Alejandro for a divorce, he does not accept her request and tells her that if they got married it was because of their love for each other. Alejandro finds no proof of his relationship with Sofía and suspects that his accident was provoked. Isabela complains to Karen for going out shopping with Sofía and Rebeca. Sofía accompanies Alejandro to his press conference and he introduces her as his wife. Isabela assures Karen that everything is going wrong. Alejandro invites Sofía for a yacht ride, she wants to talk about his relationship with Isabela. Sofía rejects Alejandro's gift and assures him that she is not an interested woman, he gives her a kiss.
6	"Tú eres solo mía"	31 October 2022	3.1
Sofía tells Rebeca that she likes Alejandro. Vanessa refuses to be intimate with Ernesto. Eduardo advises Alejandro that if he doubts his wife it would be best to ask for a divorce. Isabela continues with the idea of winning Alejandro back. Eduardo sees Sofía making out with Alejandro. Eduardo makes a scene with Sofía, she assures him that she no longer wants to be near him, Isabela finds them together and questions their relationship. Alfonso presents himself with Alejandro, but Alfonso's attitude makes Alejandro suspicious.
7	"No soy una buena mujer"	1 November 2022	2.8
Rebeca assures Eduardo that Sofía is falling in love with Alejandro, he threatens to put her in jail if things don't go as planned. Sofía does not want to reveal the truth to Alejandro and feels bad about lying to him. Sofía fears that her dad will get drunk in front of Alejandro. Alfonso makes Alejandro swear to take care of his daughter and reveals that Sofía got married thinking he was someone else. Eduardo wants Rebeca to help him so that Sofía does not fall in love with Alejandro. Eduardo advises Lucía to talk to Alejandro to find out what part of the fortune belongs to him. Alejandro reveals his past to Sofia. Alfonso agrees to move in with his daughter Sofía and Alejandro. Eduardo has a confrontation with Alejandro for taking control of the family money. Ernesto reveals to Alejandro that he found Sofía arguing with Eduardo.
8	"Me obligó a engañarte"	2 November 2022	2.9
Sofía slaps Vanessa and assures her that she has no right to offend her. Alejandro is certain that Eduardo is behind his accident and investigates him. Eduardo tells his mother that he does not agree with Sofia's family living in their house. Sofía tells Blanquita that she is desperate because she is afraid of going to jail for being Eduardo's accomplice, Blanquita reveals to Sofía that their fathers are selling stolen goods. Alejandro confronts Eduardo and asks him to return the stolen money. Sofía tells Alejandro that she plans to return home since their families are completely different. Alejandro decides to invite Sofía to a romantic dinner and she takes the opportunity to confess that Eduardo forced her to deceive him.
9	"Nunca podría odiarte"	3 November 2022	3.1
Sofía reveals the truth to Alejandro and that she is sorry for lying to him and for being Eduardo's accomplice. Alfonso and Lucia want Sofía and Alejandro to get married in church. Sofía confesses to Alejandro that she loves him, he assures her that he can never hate her as he is also falling in love. Alejandro confronts Eduardo and swears that he will pay for all the damage he has caused, Eduardo assures him that he has proof that Sofía is lying. Isabela tells Lucía that she saw Sofía and Eduardo fighting as if they were a couple, so she feels that there is something going on between the two of them, but Lucía thinks she is misinterpreting the situation. Eduardo fears going to jail now that Alejandro knows the truth. Isabela slaps Sofía and throws her into the pool.
10	"¡Son amantes!"	4 November 2022	3.3
After Isabela's assault on Sofía, Eduardo manages to trick her into running away with him and distrusts Alejandro. Eduardo tells Isabela his plan to separate Sofía from Alejandro. Sofía confronts Alejandro and discovers Eduardo's lie. Alejandro kicks Isabela and Vanessa out of his house. To forget the bad moment Eduardo gave them, Alejandro surprises Sofía with a romantic dinner on the yacht.
11	"Aléjate de mi mujer"	7 November 2022	3.2
Sofía and Alejandro spend their first night together. Eduardo surprises Sofía and Alejandro on the yacht and threatens them, Alejandro reassures Sofía that it was just a nightmare. Eduardo confesses to Lucía that he will not allow Alejandro to take Sofía's love away from him. Rebeca provokes Eduardo's jealousy by assuring him that his sister spent the night with Alejandro. Sofía confesses to Alejandro that she is living the best of times, he thinks it is best that Eduardo no longer lives with them so they can be happy. Alejandro reveals that Eduardo wanted to kill him to keep all his fortune, Eduardo threatens him with a gun and Lucía gets between their children.
12	"Estoy harto de ti"	8 November 2022	3.3
Lucía is injured after a confrontation between Alejandro and Eduardo. Blanquita begins to work with Isabela. Eduardo provokes Alejandro's anger by assuring him that sooner or later Sofía will return to his arms. Sofía learns that her father let his friend enter Alejandro's house. Eduardo wishes Alejandro dead, Alejandro kicks him out of the house. Alan doubts that Sofía is in love with Alejandro and decides to confront her. Eduardo threatens Sofía and assures her that no one makes fun of him. Isabela is determined to get Sofía out of her way with Vanessa's help.
13	"Jugaste con mis dos hijos"	9 November 2022	3.3
Alejandro asks Lucía to open her eyes and see that Eduardo is to blame for all the misfortunes. Eduardo lies to Isabela about how he met Sofía and how Alejandro got in between the two of them. Lucía refuses to believe that her son is causing a lot of problems for the family and Alejandro tells her that she will have to denounce Eduardo, she asks him not to do so. Jimena confronts Sofía for ruining her daughter Isabela's life. Álvaro tries to win over Rebeca to make her his ally. Lucía complains to Sofía for meddling in her son's lives and sets a price for her to leave home.
14	"Vamos a comenzar nuestra historia"	10 November 2022	3.0
Eduardo plays the victim in front of his mother. Alejandro swears to Sofía that he will always be by her side and they make love. Vanessa has a business dinner with Max and at the end of their dinner, Vanessa feels a special connection. Alfonso gets into a bar fight. Álvaro badmouths Alejandro to Rebeca. Sofía surprises Alejandro with breakfast. Sofía learns that her dad was arrested.
15	"Esto se termina ahora"	11 November 2022	3.3
Lucía assures Sofía that Alejandro cannot be involved in any scandal as it could affect his business. Alfonso gets out of jail. Alan shows Alejandro a video of Alfonso boarding his plane hours before his accident. Alan asks Alejandro not to fall for Sofia's lies, Alejandro assures him that he already knows what he will do. Alfonso faces Sofía's anger. Alejandro confronts Sofía about her father's video and assures her that he has had enough of her lies and kicks her out of the house. Sofía informs her family to leave Alejandro's house since he saw the video where Alfonso is getting on his plane the day of the accident.
16	"No quiere saber nada de mí"	14 November 2022	3.5
Alejandro confronts Alfonso and assures him that he was Eduardo's accomplice in his accident. Rebeca begs Sofía to talk to Alejandro so they can return to his house. Eduardo learns that Sofía and Alejandro broke up. Lucía informs Alejandro that she will call a shareholders' meeting to get Eduardo to return to the company. Sofía asks her father not to blame himself for what happened. Alejandro is sure that Sofía's father does not have the capacity to create an attack. Isabela learns that Sofía and Alejandro ended their relationship, so she is ready to win him back. Eduardo surprises Sofía at the inn and assures her that she will never get rid of him.
17	"¿Te creíste especial para él?"	15 November 2022	3.4
Eduardo assures Sofía that Alejandro only manipulated her, she kicks him out of the restaurant and tells him that she will never get back together with him. Rebeca has an argument with Sofía. Álvaro swears to Rebeca that when he can, he is willing to live with her. Alejandro reveals that Eduardo made illicit movements in the company and for that reason decided to dismiss him, but the board votes to bring him back. Alejandro refuses to reveal the reasons why he broke up with Sofía. Lucía informs Eduardo that she called a board meeting to bring him back to the company. Isabela approaches Alejandro again and asks him for a favor.
18	"Lo amo, pero duda de mí"	16 November 2022	3.1
Alejandro tells to Isabela that he ended his relationship with Sofía, she assures him that he always knew that she was not the right woman. Álvaro asks Rebeca to help him get Eduardo to reconcile with her sister. Rebeca begs Sofía to give Eduardo another chance. Ernesto finds Vanessa with Max and makes a scene. Alan proposes to Alejandro to annul his marriage to Sofía, but he is confused by his love for her. Alejandro is determined to give Sofía alimony because he does not want to leave her unprotected. Isabela informs Lucía that she invited Alejandro to dinner and they had a good time. Eduardo assures Sofía that he is determined to reveal the whole truth in exchange for Alejandro leaving Alfonso and her family alone.
19	"Nunca voy a estar contigo"	17 November 2022	3.3
Eduardo tries to abuse Sofía, telling her he can't live without her love. Alejandro is seduced and kissed by Isabela. Sofía tells her father what happened with Eduardo. Vanessa complains to Ernesto about the scene he made in front of Max. Isabela apologizes to Alejandro for the kiss she stole from him. Sofía confirms that Blanquita works for Isabela Escalante, comments that she was Alejandro's partner and begs her to be careful because she is a very conflictive person. Eduardo apologizes to his brother Alejandro, he no longer believes in his word and asks him not to disappoint his mother. Lucía confronts Eduardo after learning about his misappropriation of funds. Alan gives Alejandro the divorce certificate as well as the pension he wants to give Sofía, Alejandro is not convinced to sign.
20	"Lo perdí para siempre"	18 November 2022	3.0
Alejandro signs the divorce. Ernesto assures Lucía that he feels displaced by Vanessa because she only thinks about the project assigned to her by Alejandro. Alejandro accepts Isabela's invitation to go to dinner. Eduardo seeks out Karen to reveal that he likes her and that there may be something more than friendship between the two of them. Isabela proposes to Alejandro to resume their relationship, he kisses her. Vanessa reveals to Lucía that she no longer has feelings for Ernesto. Alan delivers the divorce petition to Sofía and assures her that if she signs it, she will be free.
21	"Nadie vuelve a hablar de esa mujer"	21 November 2022	2.9
Isabela warns Eduardo that if he plays with her sister Karen she is capable of killing him. Rebeca insults Sofía when she learns that she rejected the money that Alejandro offered her. Lucía asks Eduardo to fix his problems with Alejandro. Isabela asks Karen to be careful of Eduardo. Alejandro learns that Sofía rejected his pension. Lucía manages to reunite her family, Eduardo blames Sofía for all the problems and Alejandro comes to her defense. Alfonso informs Alejandro that Eduardo came to his house and tried to abuse Sofía and asks him to stay away from his family. Sofía finds out that Alejandro is dating Isabela and for that reason he asked her for a divorce, when she receives a call from him she asks him to go on with his life and leave her alone. Alejandro confronts Eduardo for what he did to Sofía.
22	"Esa mujer es el diablo"	22 November 2022	3.0
Alejandro confronts Eduardo for hurting Sofía, Eduardo tells him that it is she who keeps looking for him. Ernesto warns Max that he could get in trouble with him if he keeps texting his wife in the middle of the night, Max decides to end his working relationship with the company. Álvaro surprises Rebeca by giving her a car, but in exchange he asks her to talk to Alejandro and tell him that Eduardo did not want to abuse Sofía, she was the one who sought him out. Alejandro refuses to believe that Sofia planned his accident. Rebeca celebrates that her plan went perfectly. Sofía and Alfonso hope that Rebeca will change her attitude. Isabela has an intention to travel with Alejandro to Mexico City. Vanessa begs Max not to abandon the project, he surprises her with a kiss.
23	"No voy a permitir que pises la cárcel"	23 November 2022	3.2
Vanessa rejects Max's kiss, but keeps thinking about him. Rebeca regrets having lied to Alejandro. Lucía celebrates her son's signing at the Mexican Stock Exchange and plans to organize a dinner to celebrate the moment. Max apologizes to Vanessa for the kiss he gave her and assures her that his intentions are only for work. Alfonso is summoned to testify about Alejandro's accident. Rebeca, upon learning of her father's situation, decides to ask Álvaro for help, but Sofía forbids her to do so. Rebeca threatens to tell Alejandro the truth if Álvaro or Eduardo refuses to help her father. Eduardo kneels in front of Sofía to show his repentance. Alejandro is questioned about Sofía's whereabouts.
24	"Orden de restricción"	24 November 2022	3.2
Sofía tells Eduardo that because of him her father is about to go to jail. Lucía organizes a dinner to celebrate Alejandro's business and invites Eduardo. Sofía denounces Eduardo for attempted rape, the authorities assure her that since there is no evidence against him, the lawsuit cannot be filed, but they issue a restraining order. Eduardo seeks to take over Ernesto's project in order to take advantage of the company. Eduardo receives a restraining order in favor of Sofía Chavez for sexual harassment.
25	"Ya es demasiado tarde"	25 November 2022	3.7
Lucía is tired of Sofía and is willing to put a stop to her. Alejandro learns that Sofía filed a restraining order against Eduardo. Vanessa reveals to Isabela that she is getting attached to Max. Alejandro surprises Sofía at the restaurant and she confirms that Eduardo wanted to hurt her. Alejandro tries to reconcile, but Sofía rejects him. Sofía confronts Rebeca about the lie she told Alejandro and is sure that Eduardo is behind her betrayal. Rebeca decides to leave home and tells her father that she cannot be near Sofía. Alfonso gives his statement, but is arrested.
26	"Presunto culpable"	28 November 2022	3.2
Alfonso is arrested because his statement presented many inconsistencies. Álvaro refuses to live with Rebeca. Isabela finds out that Alejandro looked for Sofía. Rebeca begs Eduardo to help her father get out of jail, he refuses since Sofía put a restraining order on him. Ernesto seeks to win Vanessa back and surprises her with a romantic evening. Rebeca tells Sofía that Eduardo is willing to help them as long as she withdraws the restraining order she filed against him. Alejandro begins to remember events from his accident. Alfonso is willing to plead guilty because he does not want his daughters to approach Alejandro and Eduardo for help.
27	"Tu papá es inocente"	29 November 2022	3.2
Alejandro learns that Sofía's father has been transferred to the prison. Eduardo takes Rebeca's car away from her for not helping him get back together with Sofía. Hugo helps Alejandro to remember what happened the day of his accident and confirms that Alfonso is innocent. Fausto manages to give Sofía money to pay the lawyer and get Alfonso out of jail. Alejandro arrives to testify about what happened the day of the accident, Sofía, upon seeing him, asks him to help her father. Max arrives at Isabela's party, but Vanessa is uncomfortable when she sees him. Alejandro informs Sofía that her dad is innocent, she hugs him in gratitude.
28	"Dejemos todo atrás"	30 November 2022	3.2
Alejandro complains to Sofía for not asking for his help to get her father out of jail. Eduardo threatens Blanquita with harm if she tries to say anything about what happened with Sofía. Alejandro assures Lucía that Eduardo wanted to kill him but Lucía refuses to believe his accusations. Isabela advises Vanessa to forget about Max. Eduardo learns that Sofia's father got out of jail with Alejandro's help. Alejandro looks for Sofía at the restaurant and begs her for a second chance. Isabela hopes that Alejandro will formalize their relationship.
29	"¿Te quieres casar conmigo?"	1 December 2022	2.9
Sofía assures Alejandro that his family can't stand her so she is not willing to separate him from them. Lucía tells Max to stay away from Vanessa. Karen deludes Isabela by assuring her that Alejandro is going to ask for her hand. Alejandro organizes a romantic evening by the sea to propose to Sofía. Vanessa plans to organize a party for her brother's engagement to Isabela.
30	"Puede besar a la novia"	2 December 2022	3.0
Sofía agrees to marry Alejandro, but Alfonso opposes the marriage. Rebeca learns that her sister has reconciled with Alejandro. Alejandro takes Sofía to choose her wedding dress. Vanessa is determined to divorce Ernesto. Eduardo plans to swindle Ernesto with his project. Isabela calls Alejandro, she believes he is going to propose. Sofía and Alejandro get married.
31	"Nada nos podrá separar"	5 December 2022	3.2
Blanquita asks Alejandro not to play with Sofía's feelings. Rebeca apologizes to Sofía. Isabela tells Eduardo that she took advantage of Sofía's absence to get closer to Alejandro. Karen asks Eduardo to prove that he is really in love with her. Sofia and Alejandro have their first night as husband and wife. Sofía gets ready to face Alejandro's family. Isabela prepares for her engagement party with Alejandro. Rebeca asks Sofía to take her to live at Alejandro's house. Lucía sees Alejandro and tells him that she thought he was going to formalize his relationship with Isabela, he announces to his family that he has married Sofía.
32	"El verdadero peligro soy yo"	6 December 2022	3.2
Alejandro assures Isabela that he has always been clear with her. Lucía breaks down in tears when she learns that her family is separated. Isabela assures Eduardo that Alejandro blames him for wanting to kill him. Isabela suffers a crisis when she feels betrayed by Alejandro. Vanessa humiliates Sofía during dinner. Max tells Vanessa that if Alejandro is fighting with his family over a woman, it is because he really loves her. Lucía leaves the house because she does not want to see Sofía destroy Alejandro.
33	"Que muera de celos"	7 December 2022	3.5
Álvaro tells Rebeca that in order for Eduardo to remain happy, he needs her to be closer to Sofía to know all of her plans. Lucía talks to Jimena and tells her that maybe she is wrong and Sofía is a good woman. Vanessa learns that her mother has left the house. Eduardo congratulates Alejandro on his wedding to Sofía and warns him to be careful with her so she doesn't change him for a richer man. Sofía asks Alejandro to go somewhere else so they can be happy. After Vanessa complains to Sofía for kicking her mother out of the house, Sofía looks for Lucía at Jimena's house to talk things over.
34	"Ya no hay nada que nos separe"	8 December 2022	3.5
Jimena calls Sofía a slut for messing with Lucía's sons. Sofía vents to her sister, Rebeca takes advantage of Sofía's vulnerable moment to put Eduardo's plan into action. Vanessa asks Ernesto for a divorce. Alejandro proposes to Sofía to work at the corporate office. Max learns that Vanessa has asked Ernesto for a divorce, but he decides to stay away from her.
35	"Le voy a poner un alto"	9 December 2022	2.8
Sofía and Eduardo run into each other at the corporate office, he warns her that he will not allow her to get involved in the family business. Ernesto tells Eduardo that Vanessa has asked him for a divorce, he assures him that they must move forward with the project, but for that he needs the money. Lucía warns Sofía that she will not allow her to get involved in the family business, Lucía meets with Vanessa and Eduardo to propose a plan. Alejandro wants to support Sofía to better herself professionally. Ernesto begs Vanessa to think things through. Lucía takes away Alejandro's power within the company since he is not in a position to command it.
36	"La voy a destruir"	12 December 2022	2.8
Alejandro will not allow Eduardo to take his place in the company. Rebeca arrives at Alejandro's house to support Sofía. Isabela meets with Eduardo to ask him for information about Sofía. Alejandro forbids Sofía to leave the house because of his family's whims. Sofía tries to convince Vanessa that they should not take the presidency away from Alejandro and asks her to give herself a chance to get to know her so that she can change her perception of her. Alejandro complains to Jimena for forbidding Sofía to talk to Lucía to settle their differences. Alfonso is beaten up in his restaurant.
37	"Las desgracias llegan sin avisar"	13 December 2022	3.4
Alfonso learns that his food business will be closed until the responsibilities of the fight that took place are determined. Alejandro tries to set a trap for Eduardo. Isabela learns that Alfonso's restaurant has been closed and celebrates that the damage Sofía did to him is now being paid for by her father. Sofía refuses to let Alejandro help her pay the fine and recover the restaurant's concession. Blanquita confesses to Sofía that Isabela was to blame for the closing of the restaurant. Sofía forbids Isabela to humiliate her again and puts a stop to her by slapping her.
38	"Hacerse la víctima"	14 December 2022	3.5
Isabela tells Alejandro that Sofía assaulted her and now fears for her life. Sofía explains to Alejandro what really happened with Isabela and that the slap she gave her was because she insulted her. Eduardo tries to bribe the leader of the fishermen. Isabela challenges Sofía to prove that she had something to do with the closing of the restaurant. Álvaro opens a savings account for Rebeca, but in reality it is for Eduardo's illicit business. Ernesto kisses Vanessa and she mistakes him for Max. Sofía asks Hugo for help to teach her good manners because she doesn't want to make a fool of Alejandro.
39	"¡Que se haga responsable!"	15 December 2022	3.4
Isabela tells Vanessa not to be so obvious that she likes Max. Alejandro learns that Eduardo wanted to bribe the leader of the fishermen. Sofía asks Rebeca not to trust Álvaro. Alejandro proves to his mother that the decision she made to split the presidency was not the right one. Alejandro asks the leader of the fishermen to trust him and promises to fulfill all his requests. Max kisses Vanessa and asks her to stay with him. Lucía gets upset with Eduardo for causing the fishermen's strike. Ernesto finds Max with Vanessa and insults her by claiming she spent the night with her lover, Max defends her.
40	"Esto no se va a quedar así"	16 December 2022	3.2
Lucía asks Eduardo to stop blaming Alejandro for all his mistakes. Vanessa slaps Ernesto for calling her a slut. Alfonso refuses to live in Alejandro's house. Eduardo proposes to Jimena to sell him shares in the company so that his brother does not have so much power. Vanessa gives Ernesto the divorce papers, but he threatens to reveal her infidelity. Jimena proposes to Lucía to sell her shares in his company. Isabela fires Blanquita out of the company when she learns that she is Sofia's friend.
41	"El amor no debería doler"	19 December 2022	3.0
Ernesto asks Eduardo to speed up his project so he can impress Vanessa. Lucía learns that Vanessa and Max are lovers. Alejandro wants to settle his differences with Vanessa, but she refuses. Lucía asks Vanessa to fix her marriage crisis and forbids her to be Max's partner. Alejandro learns that his mother wants to put a stock package up for sale so that Jimena can be a partner. Sofía accepts that she is jealous of Isabela and asks Alejandro not to talk about her when they are together. Eduardo asks Isabela to tell Jimena to leave her as her representative now that she has bought the shares so she can be close to Alejandro. Ernesto asks Vanessa for five million dollars in exchange for their divorce.
42	"Esto va a terminar muy mal"	20 December 2022	3.1
Isabela finds out that Lupita and Blanca are Sofía's friends and fires them from the hotel. Eduardo makes Ernesto sign some legal documents. Vanessa tells Lucía that Ernesto is asking for five million dollars for a divorce. Alejandro gives Blanquita a job. Alejandro tells Jimena that he does not agree to her buying shares in the company, she swears that he will pay for what he did to Isabela now that she is part of the committee. Eduardo complains to Ernesto for what he did to Vanessa and assures him that with his signature he will be able to take everything away. Alejandro asks Vanessa to help convince Lucía not to sell shares to Jimena. Isabela assures Alejandro that her love for him will never change.
43	"La esposa que siempre quisiste"	21 December 2022	3.2
Karen tells Eduardo that if he plans to take the next step with her it must be something romantic. Vanessa assures Lucía that she would rather give him her shares in exchange for her happiness. Rebeca is embarrassed to see that food is being given away to publicize her father's restaurant. Ernesto refuses to receive the amount of money Eduardo is offering him. Álvaro assures Rebeca that as long as she keeps passing information to Eduardo about Sofía, she can have everything she wants. Sofía, knowing that Isabela is going to be close to Alejandro, asks him not to fall for her provocations. Ernesto vows to destroy Vanessa's family. Vanessa asks Alejandro for help after Ernesto's declarations.
44	"Va a pagar las consecuencias"	22 December 2022	2.8
Alejandro confronts his mother and tells her that he is going to help Vanessa in whatever she needs. Álvaro informs Eduardo that Sofía and Alejandro have plans to become parents. Alejandro confronts Ernesto and assures him that he is going to sue him since he signed a confidentiality contract, Ernesto blackmails him with revealing important family information, but Alejandro hits him. Eduardo tells Sofía that Alejandro and Isabela are lovers; she decides to go to Alejandro's office and finds him with Isabela.
45	"Que se quede con ella"	23 December 2022	2.8
Sofía makes a scene with Alejandro when she finds him with Isabela. Eduardo denies that he was looking for Sofía, Alejandro asks him to stop lying, and Lucía gives Eduardo a warning. Isabela celebrates Sofía falling for her scheme. Alejandro asks Sofía to be honest with him and tell him if she is still seeing Eduardo. Ernesto is photographed while kissing another woman. Sofía refuses to go to the event where the new shareholders of Grupo Alva will be presented. Lucía shows Ernesto the photos of him kissing another woman and blackmails him. Sofía is asked by the press if it is true that she is divorcing Alejandro, she begins to be overwhelmed by the questions, but Miguel Cantú manages to rescue her.
46	"¿Una familia unida?"	26 December 2022	2.9
Upon learning more about the Noriega family, Miguel becomes interested in investing in Grupo Alva. Lucía thinks that Sofía is trying to take advantage of the situation in the negotiation between Miguel and Alejandro. Isabela takes advantage of the media's comments regarding Miguel and Sofía to generate distrust in Alejandro.
47	"¡Me quieres de adorno!"	27 December 2022	3.4
Rebeca is furious when she realizes that her father is financially supporting Malena, so she demands that she stop taking advantage of her father. Ernesto learns that the profits generated by his project at Grupo Alva are being transferred to bank accounts that do not belong to the Noriegas. Ernesto asks Rebeca for an explanation as to why her bank account is receiving millionaire transactions that belong to him, however, she is also unaware of such movements and is surprised by this. Miguel arrives at the dinner with the Noriegas and Sofía attends to him while Alejandro arrives, however, Miguel suffers a seizure and Sofía tries to help him.
48	"Los celos son lo más cercano al infierno"	28 December 2022	3.1
After suffering an attack, Miguel tells Sofía that he suffers from a rare disease and asks her to be very discreet. Upon learning of the fortune in her account, Rebeca demands that Álvaro withdraw all the money so that she can keep it in her possession. Isabela loses her mind when she hears from her mother that Lucía is beginning to have a favorably opinion on Sofía. Fed up with Alejandro's jealousy, Sofía packs her bags to leave the house until Alejandro has confidence in her and his behavior improves.
49	"Es de vida o muerte"	29 December 2022	3.3
Isabela is upset to learn that Lucía is starting to give Sofía a chance. Malena apologizes to Fausto for seeing her kissing Poncho, making it clear that she can't see her as anything more than a friend. Lucía attends a breakfast at Alejandro and Sofia's house where they talk about why she left the house and what her opinion of Sofía was. Ernesto gives the divorce certificate to Vanessa and apologizes for not having valued her enough, hoping that she will do well and forgive him. While Ernesto demands that Rebeca cooperate with him, she tells him to keep her out of his shady business.
50	"Contigo aprendí a volar solo"	30 December 2022	3.0
While Ernesto is on his way to see Alejandro, Eduardo stops him in the middle of nowhere and threatens him if he talks to his brother. Poncho talks to Fausto to tell him that the kiss he saw between him and Malena was just a misunderstanding. While Sofía waits for Alejandro at the hotel, she runs into Miguel, who makes her uncomfortable with his comments about her.
51	"Eres parte de esta familia"	2 January 2023	3.2
Miguel tells Sofía that he has not had good experiences in love. Sofía arrives at Isabela's house to accompany Alejandro. Lucía apologizes to Sofía in front of the family for all the hurt she has caused her. Isabela loses control when she learns that Sofía has already won over Lucía. Sofía tells Alejandro that Eduardo showed up at the restaurant and that she is afraid he will hurt her. Isabela hints that Miguel might be interested in Sofía. When Alejandro learns that Eduardo has sought out his wife again, he puts a stop to him.
52	"Alejandro nunca será para ti"	3 January 2023	3.3
Lucía asks Alejandro to get out of his mind that Eduardo wants his wife. Sofía tells Jimena and Isabela that they took advantage of the Noriega family's problems to get into their business. Isabela shoves Sofía into the pool. Ernesto makes a million-dollar offer to Rebeca so that she can leave the country and thus not put herself in danger; she accepts. Eduardo assures Miguel that if he wants to achieve all his goals who he should deal with is him and not Alejandro. Jimena advises Isabela to wait for Sofia's first mistake to approach Alejandro.
53	"El trágico final de un vil mentiroso"	4 January 2023	3.4
Eduardo tells Álvaro that he plans to play with Alejandro's jealousy. Rebeca, knowing that her life is in danger, says goodbye to her family and asks Sofía for forgiveness. Ernesto says goodbye to Vanessa. Sofía tells Alejandro that she is very worried about her sister. Álvaro finds the money that Rebeca took from the bank, she confesses that Ernesto forced her. Isabela, seeing that Lucía is upset with her, asks for an apology. Vanessa thanks Sofía for her sincerity. Ernesto discovers that Rebeca set him up, so he asks Eduardo for a chance to escape. Miguel tells Alejandro that Eduardo is doing business behind his back. Eduardo forces Ernesto to write a letter asking for Vanessa's forgiveness.
54	"Vete a lloriquear a otro lado"	5 January 2023	3.4
Alejandro tells Lucía what Eduardo is doing behind her back. Karen, seeing Eduardo so anxious, asks him if he did something wrong. Álvaro warns Rebeca that she must be on his side so that she can continue to enjoy everything she wants. Alejandro tells Sofía that his mother plans to move back into the house. Vanessa learns that Ernesto was found dead in his apartment. Rebeca receives the news of Ernesto's death and blames Álvaro and Eduardo. Jimena advises Isabela to take advantage of Vanessa's situation to gain more power in the company. Rebeca confronts Eduardo for what he did to Ernesto. Eduardo asks Álvaro to take Rebeca away from the funeral because he fears she will reveal the truth. Vanessa, feeling guilty about Ernesto's death, asks Max to stay out of her life.
55	"Sofía cae en la cruel trampa de Eduardo"	6 January 2023	3.2
Max accepts Vanessa's decision and walks away from her. Eduardo assures Lucía that he does not intend to follow Alejandro's rules, she demands that he work under the company's guidelines. Isabela convinces Vanessa to take a trip. Eduardo is upset with Karen when he learns that she will take a trip with Vanessa and Isabela. Vanessa gives the order not to modify Ernesto's office. Rebeca comments to Sofía that she can't believe she is settling for Alejandro's love. Rebeca puts a few drops in Sofia's drink, Eduardo takes advantage of her sleeping to kiss her and pretend he was with her, Alejandro finds them together in bed.
56	"Metiste a tu amante a nuestra cama"	9 January 2023	3.4
Alejandro beats up Eduardo, he confronts Sofía for being his brother's mistress, but she denies everything. Alejandro kicks Sofía out of his house. Miguel rescues Sofía, she suffers a nervous breakdown and faints. Alejandro tells Lucía that he found Eduardo with Sofía in bed together. Sofía reveals to Miguel that Alejandro kicked her out of his house and decides to tell him about her past. Lucía looks for Sofía at her father's restaurant, but Carmen makes her leave. Vanessa agrees to let Isabela vote for her in the council now that she is not feeling well enough to make decisions. Sofía comments to Miguel that Eduardo is not a person to trust. Lucía confronts Eduardo for messing with Sofía.
57	"Se fueron mis ganas de vivir"	10 January 2023	3.3
Eduardo tells Lucía that the only thing he is responsible for is loving Sofía. Alejandro reveals to Alfonso that he kicked out Sofía from his house because he found her with Eduardo. Miguel surprises Sofía with gifts and tells her that he will end his partnership with the Noriegas, but Sofía asks him not to, he makes her a job offer. Sofía tells her father that she lost Alejandro because of Eduardo. Karen complains to Eduardo for sleeping with Sofía, he blames her because she always rejected him. Alejandro freaks out when he remembers Eduardo's words.
58	"Qué hago con este dolor"	11 January 2023	3.5
Jimena complains to Lucía for not being a good mother since Alejandro and Eduardo have been in charge of destroying her daughters. Isabela swears that she wants Sofía dead because she is the only one to blame for her misfortunes. Jimena confronts Eduardo for what he did to Karen and assures him that his mistake is wanting to be like Alejandro. Vanessa and Max are photographed kissing and get carried away by passion. Eduardo learns that Sofía is staying at Miguel's house.
59	"Déjame protegerte"	12 January 2023	3.4
Lucía forbids Vanessa to see Max. Miguel tells Sofía that he received a strange call from Eduardo, so he thinks he already knows she is staying at his house. Vanessa gives Isabela the power to make decisions in the company. Lucía assures Alejandro that he has the intelligence to get ahead and asks him not to let his guard down. Miguel assures Alejandro and Eduardo that they must fix their problems before continuing in business. Lucía accepts Jimena's apology. Max asks Vanessa for a chance.
60	"No tengo nada que hablar contigo"	13 January 2023	3.2
After witnessing the argument between Eduardo and Alejandro, Miguel informs Eduardo to fix the situation with his brother, because after seeing their fight, he thinks it was not a good idea to invest with them. After the constant family problems, Lucía decides to leave the company for a while, leaving the power to Ximena. Immediately after taking over as director of Grupo Alva, Ximena looks for Eduardo to propose a deal and get Alejandro out of the company. Sofía decides to go look for Alejandro, running into Vanessa and Lucía who ask her to stay away from him.
61	"Sanar nuestros corazones"	16 January 2023	3.5
Sofía, feeling insulted by Alejandro, slaps him, Lucía kicks Sofía out of the house after witnessing their fight. Jimena starts her business with Eduardo. Eduardo asks Álvaro to review his mother's reports so that he can cut expenses so that his construction company will have a larger budget. Isabela advises Alejandro not to get back with Sofía because she only causes him pain. Rebeca suggests Sofía to ask Alejandro for a divorce to get a large sum of money from him. Eduardo plans to use Karen to show his mother that he regrets what happened with Sofía. Jimena advises her daughters to take advantage of the damage the Noriegas have caused them to pay for their mistakes. Miguel swears to Sofía that he will start taking care of his health in exchange for her forgetting Alejandro so that they can both heal their hearts.
62	"No te cierres al destino"	17 January 2023	3.3
Alejandro wants to give all the power to Eduardo, but Alan asks him to think things through. Jimena oversees all the company's movements and informs Eduardo that she already knows where he is going to get money from Alejandro. Eduardo surprises Karen with a romantic dinner, but she makes her disdain evident. Sofía commits to Miguel to take care of him and attend to him personally while he recovers his health. Lucía thanks Isabela for everything she is doing for Alejandro. Karen does not resist Eduardo's charms and gives herself to him. Eduardo proposes to Karen.
53	"No te voy a querer dejar ir"	18 January 2023	3.3
Karen rejects Eduardo's engagement ring. Miguel thanks Sofía for everything she is doing for him. Sofía learns that Miguel had a sad past in love. Jimena advises Eduardo to give Karen time. Isabela asks Alejandro to take control of the company since everyone needs him but he is determined to hand over management to Eduardo as he wants to leave Grupo Alva for a while. Isabela assures Jimena that she doesn't like her working behind Alejandro's back. Miguel asks Sofía to invite her family to his house so that they can feel at ease. Narro and the fishermen arrive at Grupo Alva's offices to talk to Alejandro, Álvaro provokes them, but Sofía asks them to calm down because Alejandro is a man of his word and he will answer for what is happening.
64	"Cada vez decepciona más"	19 January 2023	3.6
Sofía reiterates to Alejandro that she cares about him and that is why she wanted to help him with the fishermen issue. Jimena gives the authorization to build the new hotels. Alejandro complains to Eduardo for not being aware of the fishermen's issue and informs him that he will now be in charge of the management of the company. Rebeca meets Miguel and assures him that the Noriega family always humiliated them. Eduardo shows his mother that he is sorry and comments that he proposed to Karen. Hugo advises Alejandro to take a pause in his life, but not to let Eduardo destroy the company. Eduardo tells Karen and Isabela about his plans as director of Grupo Alva. Miguel lets Alejandro know that Sofía is living in his house.
65	"Ayúdame a olvidarla"	20 January 2023	3.3
Miguel complains to Alejandro about the way he treated Sofía, Alejandro asks him to stay out of their relationship. Karen tells Isabela that she will accept Eduardo's marriage proposal, but she will make him pay for his deception. Jimena learns of Karen's plans with Eduardo and celebrates that at last the Noriega fortune will be on her side. Miguel tries to help Sofía forget Alejandro. Eduardo swears to Karen that he will never see Sofía again, Karen agrees to marry him. Alejandro asks Isabela to help him forget Sofía, he kisses her.
66	"Qué rico es despertar en tus brazos"	23 January 2023	3.3
Isabela swears to Alejandro that she will not fail him, kisses him and takes him to bed. Karen wants to announce her engagement to Eduardo. Alejandro realizes that he spent the night with Isabela and tells her that it was a mistake. Eduardo assures Jimena that he is going to start construction on the new hotel. Miguel receives good news about his health. Karen tells Isabela that now she is going to get paid for everything Eduardo did to her. Alejandro wants to break off his working relationship with Miguel, Vanessa refuses, but Alejandro begs her to support him. Isabela looks for Sofía at the restaurant to let her know that she reconciled with Alejandro.
67	"Una oportunidad para volver a amar"	24 January 2023	3.5
Isabela warns Eduardo that she will not play with her sister. Jimena informs Alejandro that she will be the one doing business with Miguel. Miguel asks Sofía to give herself another chance to love again. Alejandro rejects Jimena's proposal and tells her that she doesn't have the business experience. Álvaro threatens Rebeca with revealing everything he knows about her. Sofía agrees to go out with Miguel. Alejandro no longer wants to know anything about the company. Sofía finds Alejandro making out with Isabela.
68	"Estoy enamorado de otra mujer"	25 January 2023	3.5
Karen sets her conditions to Eduardo for their wedding. Sofía learns what was done to her father and is ready to denounce Ulises for robbery. Alejandro tells Vanessa that she can no longer trust anyone. Rebeca surprises Miguel while he is in the shower and kisses him, he assures her that she is confusing the moment since he is in love with another woman, Rebeca asks Miguel not to say anything to Sofía. Vanessa tells Isabela that she is feeling nostalgic since she found several letters from Ernesto. Alejandro looks for Sofía at the restaurant, but Alfonso makes him leave.
69	"¿Tan pronto me olvidaste?"	26 January 2023	3.5
Alejandro complains to Sofía for living with Miguel, she refuses to talk to him. Eduardo senses that Karen is putting him to the test with all her demands. Vanessa assures Eduardo that there is something strange about Ernesto's death and she is going to investigate. Rebeca asks Miguel for a job. Alejandro regrets looking for Sofía. Vanessa discovers that Ernesto had communication with Rebeca, so she suspects she had something to do with his death. Isabela begs Alejandro for a chance and he asks her to stay in the house, she accepts and tells him that she is willing to start a life with him.
70	"¡Estás embarazada!"	27 January 2023	3.6
Eduardo blackmails Rebeca and tells her that the more information she gives him, the more he will help her. Isabela proposes to Karen to get Alejandro and Eduardo to reconcile so that Lucía will always be grateful to them and that way they can have control of the family. Eduardo plans to take over Miguel's company. Miguel confesses to Sofía how he feels about her. Alan finds Álvaro with Luis and assures him that he should not be in the area since it is business that does not belong to Eduardo. Sofía learns that she is pregnant, she tells Miguel that she is sad to know that Alejandro will not be with her during the pregnancy and asks him to keep it a secret because she wants to protect her baby from the Noriega family.
71	"Estoy enamorado de ti"	30 January 2023	3.7
Miguel surprises Sofía with gifts to take care of herself during her pregnancy, he tries to kiss her, but Blanquita interrupts them. Sofía is willing to return to La Paz so that her son can be away from Alejandro's family. Lucía plans to leave the house for a few days to give Isabela and Alejandro their space. Jimena tells Eduardo that Alan has complained about the money they took from Miguel. Isabela swears to Vanessa that she will fight for Alejandro and Eduardo to reconcile. Alfonso reveals to Fausto that he has feelings for Malena. Miguel learns that Sofía plans to return to La Paz and asks her to stay by his side since he is in love with her, she refuses to give him a chance since she is still Alejandro's wife.
72	"Sofía, siempre Sofía"	31 January 2023	3.4
Rebeca learns that Miguel is in love with Sofía. Sofia confesses to Rebeca that she is expecting Alejandro's child, but refuses to let him know the news; Rebeca asks Sofía not to be selfish with her son and let him enjoy the Noriega's wealth. Alfonso thanks his Sofía for having bought him the restaurant. Miguel confirms to Sofía that he bought the restaurant so that Alfonso could continue working and so she would not worry now about him. Vanessa sees Rebeca at the office and finds out that she is Max's assistant. Miguel visits Alejandro to inform him that he no longer plans to work with his family after they took his money without his authorization. Alejandro assures Isabela that Jimena and Eduardo are the only ones to blame for Miguel's withdrawal from Grupo Alva, he confronts Eduardo for doing business behind his back.
73	"Ya entendí que perdí"	1 February 2023	3.5
Rebeca tells Max that Sofía is expecting Alejandro's child. Vanessa, seeing that Alejandro is no longer interested in the company, informs him that she is going to put his expulsion from Grupo Alva to a vote. Alfonso and Malena kiss. Sofía learns that Grupo Alva could go bankrupt with the departure of Miguel as a shareholder. Alejandro learns of Eduardo's plans with his construction company. Vanessa tells Max that she does not want Rebeca to be working with him. Alejandro asks Miguel to reconsider staying with the company and to understand that it is not easy to lose a person like Sofía. Miguel agrees to stay at Grupo Alva. Isabela feels like she is not making Alejandro happy. Álvaro discovers that Rebeca is hiding baby clothes.
74	"¡Ese hijo no va a nacer!"	2 February 2023	3.4
Álvaro is filled with emotion when he learns that Rebeca is expecting his child, but she ends up confessing that Sofía is the one who is pregnant and although Rebeca asked him to keep it a secret, Álvaro reveals this to Eduardo. Sofía questions Rebeca about what happened the night Alejandro found her with Eduardo. Miguel assures Vanessa and Eduardo that they do not have their brother's experience in business, Alejandro asks Vanessa and Eduardo to give back Miguel's money. Isabela learns of Sofía's pregnancy and is sure that there is a possibility that her baby is also Eduardo's, so she and Karen are ready to confront her. Eduardo informs Alejandro that they must take a DNA test since Sofía is pregnant and does not know who the father is.
75	"Lo siento, Sofía"	3 February 2023	3.8
Hugo begs Alejandro not to fall into Eduardo's lies and asks him to look for Sofía. Isabela sees Sofía alone in the street and runs her over, Karen bursts into tears when she sees Isabela did. Alejandro complains to Miguel for not telling him that Sofía is pregnant. Isabela asks Karen to calm down, she gets upset and Isabela slaps her. Alejandro learns that there is a possibility that Sofía could lose her baby. Sofía wakes up and asks for Miguel. Isabela learns that Alejandro is in the hospital. Sofía confirms that it was her sister Rebeca who betrayed her by revealing that she is pregnant. Alejandro asks Sofía for another chance.
76	"Soy capaz de todo por mi bebé"	6 February 2023	3.9
Sofía tells Alejandro that they cannot be together since her family does not like her. Jimena helps her daughters to avoid being discovered for having run over Sofía. Isabela informs Eduardo that Sofía is in the hospital since she was run over. Eduardo suspects that Karen is hiding something from him, she gets nervous and tells him that it is all because of the wedding plans. Vanessa tells Alejandro that Sofía is just manipulating him, he assures her that his wife and baby are his only family. Lucía accuses Jimena of breach of trust because she didn't like her making decisions during her absence. Sofía cries when she learns that her son is in danger. Lucía confronts Eduardo about the money he took from Miguel and that the project he is doing is only to please Karen. Alfonso asks Alejandro to stay away from Sofía so that his grandson can be born.
77	"Yo no me voy a casar"	7 February 2023	3.8
Lucía learns that Sofía is pregnant, but Eduardo assures her that she doesn't know if the baby is his or Alejandro's. Isabela pretends to be excited about Sofía pregnancy. Miguel tells Sofía that he will show her all the love he has for her. Lucía tells Vanessa that she will not allow her grandson to grow up away from the family. Eduardo confronts Isabela by telling her that she ran over Sofía. Alfonso is determined to announce his relationship with Malena. Sofía learns that her baby is out of danger. Karen prepares her suitcase to leave town and stand up Eduardo on the wedding day, Jimena forbids her to do so, slaps her and assures her that if she wants to take revenge on him, she should do it when she is married.
78	"Puede besar a la novia"	8 February 2023	4.1
Alfonso confesses to Fausto that he fell in love with Malena, Fausto asks him to forget her because of the pact they made. Eduardo confirms that Karen married him for revenge, she assures him that his life will become a living hell. Sofía arrives with Miguel at Karen and Eduardo's wedding. Sofía tells Alejandro that her baby is out of danger, while Isabela comments that her son will be very loved, but Sofía says that she will not allow her baby to live with hypocritical people. Eduardo looks for Sofía to tell her that he still loves her, Miguel comes to her defense. Max asks Vanessa to start their relationship again, but to get rid of her prejudices about Sofía. Sofía tells Rebeca that she is disappointed in her because she once again betrayed her by revealing the news of her pregnancy, so she doesn't want her near her life and kicks her out of Miguel's house.
79	"Estoy lista para intentarlo"	9 February 2023	4.0
Rebeca rejects her father's relationship with Malena because she is a woman of low-income. Sofía assures Miguel that she is willing to fall in love with him. Malena breaks up with Alfonso because of Rebeca. Lucía, upon learning of Max's intentions with Vanessa, asks him to help them get Miguel to trust the company again, Max asks Lucía not to mix professional business with personal issues. Jimena informs Isabela that the police found the car with a blow and traces of blood. Alfonso surprises Malena with a romantic serenade. Sofía kisses Miguel in front of Alejandro and tells him that she has decided to give herself a chance with him, Alejandro begs to be with her, but Sofía wants him out of her life. Alejandro plans to suspend the construction of Eduardo's hotels. Eduardo swears to Miguel that Sofía's only goal is for him to take care of their son, when Miguel defends her, he begins to feel ill.
80	"Adiós, Miguel"	10 February 2023	3.7
Miguel swears to Eduardo that he will prove that he was behind Alejandro's accident. Isabela tells Karen that Eduardo already knows that she ran over Sofía. Miguel arrives home and tells Sofía that he argued with Eduardo, he begins to feel sick and dies in her arms. Jimena informs Eduardo that Lucía plans to revoke her power at the company. Eduardo celebrates Miguel's death and assures Jimena that no one will be able to stop the construction. Sofía confronts Eduardo about Miguel's death; Isabela, Karen and Jimena try to defend him, but Alejandro makes them leave the funeral. Sofía fulfills Miguel's last wish. Alejandro tells Luis that he needs him on his side to put Eduardo in jail.
81	"Soy la nueva dueña"	13 February 2023	4.0
Isabela fears that Sofía will get close to Alejandro again now that Miguel has died. Luis assures Álvaro that he is willing to help him and Eduardo in any way he can. Eduardo agrees to pay the money he took from Miguel. Sofía fears that she will not be able to handle the responsibility left to her by Miguel. Blanquita learns that Luis has given confidential information about Alejandro to Eduardo. Lucía is disappointed in Jimena. Sofía introduces herself as the new director of Grupo Cantú. Eduardo fears he will lose the land for his hotels because he does not have the money he took from Miguel. Sofía tells Alejandro that she will not continue to suffer for him. Sofía teases Isabela and asks her to enjoy Alejandro since he will soon leave her. Max receives an offer to work at Grupo Cantú. Isabela fights with Alejandro out of jealousy. Jimena fears losing her hotel because she does not have Miguel's money. Eduardo, knowing that Rebeca hid information about Sofía from him, asks Álvaro to kill her.
82	"Por fin va a pagar por lo que hizo"	14 February 2023	4.1
Álvaro tells Eduardo that he will kill Rebeca, but asks for time because he does not want to raise suspicions. Alejandro is determined to win back Sofia's love so he breaks up with Isabela. Max assures Vanessa that Jimena and Eduardo are just using her. Eduardo tells Lucía that Jimena was the only person who believed in him. Luis shows Alfonso the video that proves that Álvaro caused Alejandro's accident. Jimena asks Sofía for help. Lucía advises Vanessa to fight for Max's love. Álvaro asks Rebeca to go far away because her life is in danger since Eduardo asked him to kill her. Alejandro confirms that Eduardo sent Álvaro to alter the turbine and cause the plane crash. Álvaro is arrested for murder and assures Alejandro that he is willing to reveal everything he knows about Eduardo. Eduardo tries to kiss Sofía.
83	"No voy a regresar contigo"	15 February 2023	4.2
Knowing that Eduardo does not intend to help him, Álvaro reveals to Alejandro that Eduardo killed Ernesto and Rebeca was his accomplice so that he could play with his mind. Álvaro says goodbye to Rebeca and asks her to leave Cabo. Alejandro confesses to Sofía that Rebeca drugged her so that Eduardo would get into her bed, he apologizes for not believing her, but she rejects him. Sofía tells her father that Rebeca betrayed her. Sofía slaps Rebeca, she asks for forgiveness, but Sofía kicks her out of the house. Jimena is arrested for embezzlement. Vanessa learns that Eduardo killed Ernesto and confronts him.
84	"Dio la vida por su hermana"	16 February 2023	4.5
Eduardo threatens Vanessa now that she knows he killed Ernesto. Isabela asks Alejandro for help to get her mother out of jail, but he refuses. Alejandro confirms to Lucía that Eduardo tried to kill him, she refuses to believe that her son is a murderer. Rebeca asks Sofía to give her a second chance, Sofía reiterates that she wants her out of her life. Isabela arrives at Sofía's house to shoot her, but Rebeca intervenes and is mortally wounded. Lucía shows Eduardo the recording where he accepts his crimes and assures him that she will use it to send him to prison. Isabela is arrested for shooting Rebeca.
85	"El amor verdadero es eterno"	17 February 2023	4.7
Karen tells Isabela that she will spend more than 20 years in prison for killing Rebeca. Sofía assures Alejandro that they have only caused each other pain. Álvaro is informed that Rebeca died. Lucía apologizes for everything in front of Sofía and assures her that she was blinded by her mother's love. Karen confesses to Alejandro that Isabela ran over Sofía. Vanessa admits that she was wrong about Sofía and apologizes to her. Eduardo tries to choke Alejandro, but Lucía hits him in the head. The doctor notifies Lucía that Eduardo is in a vegetative state. Karen says goodbye to Eduardo. Sofía recovers her father's restaurant, Alejandro surprises her and asks her to give him another chance, she forgives him and they embark to celebrate their love.

== Reception ==
=== Ratings ===
Viewership and ratings per season of Cabo
Season	Timeslot (CT)	Episodes	First aired		Last aired		Avg. viewers (millions)
Season	Timeslot (CT)	Episodes	Date	Viewers (millions)	Date	Viewers (millions)	Avg. viewers (millions)
1	Mon–Fri 9:30 p.m.	85	24 October 2022	3.2	17 February 2023	4.7	3.35

=== Awards and nominations ===
Year	Award	Category	Nominated	Result	Ref
2023	Produ Awards	Best Short Telenovela	Cabo	Nominated	
2023	Produ Awards	Best Music Theme - Superseries or Telenovela	"Tú" by Melissa Robles	Nominated	
2023	Produ Awards	Best Directing - Superseries or Telenovela	Salvador Garcini and Fez Noriega	Nominated	
2024	Premios Juventud	My Favorite Actor	Matías Novoa	Nominated	
2024	Premios Juventud	My Favorite Actress	Bárbara de Regil	Nominated	
