= Itahisa Machado =

Mexican actress

- Born: April 10, 1987 (age 39); Tenerife, Canary Islands, Spain
- Occupations: Actress, model
- Years active: 2006; 2011-present
- Modeling information
- Height: 1.69 m (5 ft 7 in)
- Eye color: Brown

Itahisa Machado (born April 10, 1987, in Tenerife, Canary Islands) is a Spanish-born Mexican actress and model. She currently resides in Mexico City, Mexico.

== Career ==
She began her career as a model of commercial television. In 2006 she participated in the telenovela Yo soy Bea, had 5 years out of television and returned in the soap opera El octavo mandamiento in 2011. She has starred in soap operas such as Rosario and El Dandy.

== Filmography ==
Television performance
Year	Title	Roles	Notes
2006	Yo soy Bea	Modigliani	Episodes: "El discurso" and "Recuperando la agenda"
2011–2012	El octavo mandamiento	Yadira Escalante	
2012	Infames	Maura	
2013	Rosario	Rosario Pérez	Main role; 105 episodes
2015	El Dandy	Leticia Albarrán	Main role; 70 episodes
2016	40 y 20	Karime	Recurring role (season 2); 3 episodes
2018	Enemigo íntimo	Marimar Rubio	Recurring role (season 1); 24 episodes
2019	Cita a ciegas	Telma	Recurring role; 63 episodes
