= Alejandro Speitzer =

Mexican actor

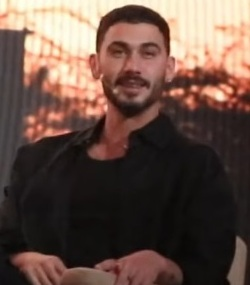
- Speitzer in 2024
- Born: Alejandro Sánchez Speitzer; 21 January 1995 (age 31); Culiacán, Sinaloa, Mexico
- Occupation: Actor
- Years active: 2000–present
- Known for: Dark Desire
- Family: Carlos Speitzer (brother)

Alejandro Sánchez Speitzer (born 21 January 1995) is a Mexican actor.

== Career ==
Alejandro Speitzer started his career as a child actor when he was 5 years old. His very first job was in a recurring role in the Mexican TV mini-series Ray of Light in 2000. He then starred his role as the titular character Juan "Rayito" de Luz in the childhood telenovela Rayito de luz. This was followed by another regular role in the television series Aventuras en el tiempo in 2001 as Ernesto. In 2002, he starred in La Familia P. Luche as Nino, and as Felipe in the series Cómplices Al Rescate the same year. From 2005 through 2012, he appeared in Misión S.O.S, Mujer, Casos de la Vida Real, Bajo las riendas del amor, Atrévete a soñar, Esperanza del corazón, La rosa de Guadalupe, and Amy, the Girl with the Blue Schoolbag.

Between 2013 and 2017, he starred in Mentir para Vivir, Como dice el dicho, El Dandy, Bajo el mismo cielo, El Chema, Guerra de Idolos, Me gusta, pero me asusta and Milagros de Navidad.

In 2018, Alejandro starred in television series Lady of Steel and Enemigo íntimo. In 2019, he starred in telenovela La Reina del Sur and crime drama The Club, where he played the leading role with Minnie West and Jorge Caballero. In 2020, he starred in two Netflix projects: the television series Dark Desire and the miniseries Someone Has To Die.

== Filmography ==
=== Film ===
Year	Title	Roles	Notes
2017	Me gusta, pero me asusta	Brayan Rodríguez	Also as executive producer
2018	Campeones	Mario	
2024	Pimpinero: Blood and Oil	Juan	
TBA	Copperhead †	—N/a	Filming

=== Television series ===
Year	Title	Roles	Notes
2000–2001	Rayito de luz	Juan de Luz "Rayito"	Main role; 20 episodes
2001	Aventuras en el tiempo	Ernesto "Neto" del Huerto	Series regular; 89 episodes
2001–2005	Mujer, casos de la vida real	Various roles	Series regular; 6 episodes
2002	La familia P. Luche	Boy	Episode: "Ludovico en la escuela"
2002	Cómplices al rescate	Felipe "Pipe" Olmos	Recurring role; 29 episodes
2004	Amy, la niña de la mochila azul	Antolín "Tolín"	Guest stars; 1 episode
2004–2005	Misión S.O.S. aventura y amor	Chale Chale	Recurring role
2007	Bajo las riendas del amor	Antonio "Toñito" Linares	Recurring role
2008–2012	La rosa de Guadalupe	Various roles	Series regular; 8 episodes
2009–2010	Atrévete a soñar	Raymundo Rincón Peña	Recurring role
2011–2014	Como dice el dicho	Various roles	Series regular; 5 episodes
2011–2012	Esperanza del corazón	Diego Duprís Landa	Series regular; 144 episodes
2013	Mentir para vivir	Sebastián Sánchez Bretón	Series regular; 70 episodes
2015–2016	Bajo el mismo cielo	Luis Martínez	Series regular; 120 episodes
2015–2016	El Dandy	Serch	Series regular
2016	Señora Acero	Juan Pablo Franco	Series regular (season 3); 28 episodes
2016	El Chema	Young Don Ricardo Almenar Paiva	Episode: "Infancia turbulenta"
2017	Guerra de ídolos	Nicolás Zabala	Series regular; 62 episodes
2017	Milagros de Navidad	Randolfo "Randy" Méndez	Episode: "Adiós Soledad"
2018–2020	Enemigo íntimo	Luis Rendón "El Berebere"	Main role (season 1); guest stars (season 2); 66 episodes
2019–present	La Reina del Sur	Ray Dávila	Main role (season 2); 38 episodes
2019	The Club	Pablo Caballero	Main role; 25 episodes
2020-2022	Dark Desire	Darío Guerra	Main role; 33 episodes
2020	Someone Has to Die	Gabino Falcón	Main role; 3 episodes
2023	La cabeza de Joaquín Murrieta	Joaquin Murrieta Carrillo	

== Awards and nominations ==
Year	Award	Category	Nominated	Result
2012	30th TVyNovelas Awards	Best Young Lead Actor	Esperanza del corazón	Nominated
2014	32nd TVyNovelas Awards	Best Young Lead Actor	Mentir para vivir	Won
2016	Your World Awards	Favorite Supporting Actor	Bajo el mismo cielo	Won
