= Dark Desire (TV series) =

Mexican television series

- Season 1 promotional poster
- Spanish: Oscuro deseo
- Genre: Thriller drama; Erotic thriller
- Created by: Leticia López Margalli
- Written by: Nayura Aragón; Gennys Pérez; Leticia López Margalli
- Directed by: Pedro P. Ybarra; Kenya Márquez
- Starring: Maite Perroni; Erik Hayser; Alejandro Speitzer; María Fernanda Yepes; Regina Pavón; Jorge Poza; Catherine Siachoque; Arturo Barba; Ariana Saavedra
- Composer: Giovanni Rotondo
- Country of origin: Mexico
- Original language: Spanish
- No. of seasons: 2
- No. of episodes: 33

Production
- Executive producer: Patricia Benítez Laucin
- Producers: Verónica Velasco; Epigmenio Ibarra; Natasha Ybarra-Klor
- Cinematography: Juan Pablo Ojeda; Jerónimo Rodríguez
- Editors: Luis Zerón Rugerio; Kevin López Yáñez
- Running time: 30–39 minutes
- Production company: Argos Comunicación

Original release
- Network: Netflix
- Release: 15 July 2020 – 2 February 2022

Dark Desire (Spanish: Oscuro deseo) is a Mexican thriller drama television series produced by Argos Comunicación for Netflix. The series stars Maite Perroni, Erik Hayser, Alejandro Speitzer, María Fernanda Yepes, Regina Pavón and Jorge Poza, The start of production was confirmed on 6 May 2019, and it premiered on 15 July 2020.

On 19 August 2020, the series was renewed for a second and final season, which premiered on 2 February 2022. It was also announced that season 1 of Dark Desire was the most watched non-English title on Netflix, amassing 35 million viewers in 28 days or 213.79 million hours.

== Synopsis ==
Alma (Maite Perroni) is a law school professor. She is married to Leonardo (Jorge Poza), a judge who has kept much from her. They are parents of Zoe (Regina Pavón). In this context, Darío (Alejandro Speitzer) and Esteban (Erik Hayser), a police officer, also come into play.

== Cast and characters ==
=== Main ===
- Maite Perroni as Alma Quintana Solares, a former lawyer and college professor who begins the affair with Darío behind her family's back.
- Erik Hayser as Esteban Solares, a former police officer and Leonardo's brother, Zoe's uncle and Alma's ex-brother-in-law
- Alejandro Speitzer as Darío Guerra, a college student and mechanic who attends Alma's class and starts to fall in love with her
- María Fernanda Yepes as Brenda Castillo (season 1), Alma's best friend who has recently gone through a divorce. She committed suicide by cutting her wrists, opening a case in which Darío, Leonardo and Esteban were suspects in Brenda's apparent murder due to their connection to her
- Regina Pavón as Zoe Solares, Alma and Leonardo's rebellious daughter and Esteban's niece who is struggling with her sexuality
- Jorge Poza as Leonardo Solares, a highly respected former judge and Alma's ex-husband, Esteban's brother and Zoe's father
- Catherine Siachoque as Lys Antoine (season 2), Darío's aunt and foster mother who had a sexual relationship with him
- Arturo Barba (Note: Arturo Barba is credited as a series regular from 2x02 onwards.) as Íñigo Lazcano (season 2), a lawyer and Julieta's father
- Ariana Saavedra (Note: Ariana Saavedra is credited as a series regular in the episodes which she appears in.) as Julieta Lazcano (season 2), Darío's fiancée who turns up dead the day before their wedding

=== Recurring ===
- Paulina Matos as Edith Ballesteros (season 1), Leonardo's assistant whom Alma initially thought to be her husband's mistress
- Leticia Huijara as Lucinda (season 1), Darío's mother
- Claudia Pineda as Patricia García (season 1), one of the detectives in charge of Brenda's case
- Esteban Soberanes as Vallejo (season 1), another of the detectives in charge of Brenda's case
- Samantha Orozco as Rosalba (season 1)
- Fabián Merlo as El Chalán (season 1)
- Tony Valdes as Jacinto (season 1)
- Eligio Meléndez as El Padrino (season 1)
- Carmen Baqué as Nancy (season 1)
- Daniel Damuzi as Carmona (season 1)
- Magali Boysselle as Mónica, a therapist who helps Alma overcome her obsession with Darío. In season 2, she organizes a group of women who had been through similar situations.
- María de Villa as Karina, Zoe's best friend and later girlfriend
- Mahoalli Nassourou as Eugenia Montaño (season 2), the detective in charge of Julieta's case

== Episodes ==
Season	Episodes	Originally released
1	18	July 15, 2020
2	15	February 22, 2022

=== Season 1 (2020) ===
No. overall	No. in season	Title	Directed by	Written by	Original release date
1	1	"It's Just Sex" (Spanish: Es solo sexo)	Pedro P. Ybarra & Kenya Márquez	Nayura Aragón, Gennys Pérez & Leticia López Margalli	15 July 2020
2	2	"One Last Night of Passion" (Spanish: Una última noche de pasión)	Pedro P. Ybarra & Kenya Márquez	Nayura Aragón, Gennys Pérez & Leticia López Margalli	15 July 2020
3	3	"What Common People Call Love" (Spanish: Eso que los normales llaman amor)	Pedro P. Ybarra & Kenya Márquez	Nayura Aragón, Gennys Pérez & Leticia López Margalli	15 July 2020
4	4	"Love, That Word" (Spanish: El amor, esa palabra)	Pedro P. Ybarra & Kenya Márquez	Nayura Aragón, Gennys Pérez & Leticia López Margalli	15 July 2020
5	5	"What Do You Know About Darío Guerra?" (Spanish: ¿Qué sabes acerca de Darío Guerra?)	Pedro P. Ybarra & Kenya Márquez	Nayura Aragón, Gennys Pérez & Leticia López Margalli	15 July 2020
6	6	"Are You Missing the Good Old Times?" (Spanish: ¿Extrañas los viejos tiempos?)	Pedro P. Ybarra & Kenya Márquez	Nayura Aragón, Gennys Pérez & Leticia López Margalli	15 July 2020
7	7	"You Messed with the Wrong Woman" (Spanish: Te metiste con la mujer equivocada)	Pedro P. Ybarra & Kenya Márquez	Nayura Aragón, Gennys Pérez & Leticia López Margalli	15 July 2020
8	8	"The Tell-Tale Heart" (Spanish: El corazón delator)	Pedro P. Ybarra & Kenya Márquez	Nayura Aragón, Gennys Pérez & Leticia López Margalli	15 July 2020
9	9	"A Wicked Game of Mirrors" (Spanish: Un perverso juego de espejos)	Pedro P. Ybarra & Kenya Márquez	Nayura Aragón, Gennys Pérez & Leticia López Margalli	15 July 2020
10	10	"The Beauty of a Sudden Death" (Spanish: La belleza de una muerte repentina...)	Pedro P. Ybarra & Kenya Márquez	Nayura Aragón, Gennys Pérez & Leticia López Margalli	15 July 2020
11	11	"Nothing Is What It Seems" (Spanish: Nada es lo que ello parece)	Pedro P. Ybarra & Kenya Márquez	Nayura Aragón, Gennys Pérez & Leticia López Margalli	15 July 2020
12	12	"We've Messed Up So Much" (Spanish: Nos hemos equivocado tanto)	Pedro P. Ybarra & Kenya Márquez	Nayura Aragón, Gennys Pérez & Leticia López Margalli	15 July 2020
13	13	"You Were Only an Innocent Victim" (Spanish: Tú solo fuiste una inocente víctima)	Pedro P. Ybarra & Kenya Márquez	Nayura Aragón, Gennys Pérez & Leticia López Margalli	15 July 2020
14	14	"Two Truths and One Lie" (Spanish: Dos verdades y una mentira)	Pedro P. Ybarra & Kenya Márquez	Nayura Aragón, Gennys Pérez & Leticia López Margalli	15 July 2020
15	15	"We Never Talked About Love" (Spanish: Nunca hablamos sobre el amor)	Pedro P. Ybarra & Kenya Márquez	Nayura Aragón, Gennys Pérez & Leticia López Margalli	15 July 2020
16	16	"Revelation 21:8... Fire Is Set Upon His Anger" (Spanish: Apocalipsis 21:8... El fuego es encendido en su ira)	Pedro P. Ybarra & Kenya Márquez	Nayura Aragón, Gennys Pérez & Leticia López Margalli	15 July 2020
17	17	"We Kill What We Love" (Spanish: Matamos lo que amamos)	Pedro P. Ybarra & Kenya Márquez	Nayura Aragón, Gennys Pérez & Leticia López Margalli	15 July 2020
18	18	"The Answer Was Always There" (Spanish: La respuesta siempre estuvo ahí...)	Pedro P. Ybarra & Kenya Márquez	Nayura Aragón, Gennys Pérez & Leticia López Margalli	15 July 2020

=== Season 2 (2022) ===
No. overall	No. in season	Title	Directed by	Written by	Original release date
19	1	"Eros and Psyche" (Spanish: Eros y Psique)	Pedro P. Ybarra & Kenya Márquez	Nayura Aragón, Gennys Pérez & Leticia López Margalli	2 February 2022
20	2	"You Can Never Escape Something Like This" (Spanish: De algo así no se escapa nunca)	Pedro P. Ybarra & Kenya Márquez	Nayura Aragón, Gennys Pérez & Leticia López Margalli	2 February 2022
21	3	"No One Can Run From Themselves" (Spanish: Nadie puede huir de sí mismo)	Pedro P. Ybarra & Kenya Márquez	Nayura Aragón, Gennys Pérez & Leticia López Margalli	2 February 2022
22	4	"The Other" (Spanish: El otro)	Pedro P. Ybarra & Kenya Márquez	Nayura Aragón, Gennys Pérez & Leticia López Margalli	2 February 2022
23	5	"Walking on Hot Coals" (Spanish: Caminar sobre las brasas)	Pedro P. Ybarra & Kenya Márquez	Nayura Aragón, Gennys Pérez & Leticia López Margalli	2 February 2022
24	6	"You Were Always My Mirror" (Spanish: Siempre fuiste mi espejo)	Pedro P. Ybarra & Kenya Márquez	Nayura Aragón, Gennys Pérez & Leticia López Margalli	2 February 2022
25	7	"A Dangerous Cocktail" (Spanish: Un coctel peligroso)	Pedro P. Ybarra & Kenya Márquez	Nayura Aragón, Gennys Pérez & Leticia López Margalli	2 February 2022
26	8	"Don't Believe a Thing You Hear" (Spanish: No creas nada de lo que escuches)	Pedro P. Ybarra & Kenya Márquez	Nayura Aragón, Gennys Pérez & Leticia López Margalli	2 February 2022
27	9	"You've Become Your Own Worst Enemy" (Spanish: Te has convertido en tu peor enemiga)	Pedro P. Ybarra & Kenya Márquez	Nayura Aragón, Gennys Pérez & Leticia López Margalli	2 February 2022
28	10	"Everyone Reads Their Own Story" (Spanish: Cada quien lee su propia historia)	Pedro P. Ybarra & Kenya Márquez	Nayura Aragón, Gennys Pérez & Leticia López Margalli	2 February 2022
29	11	"Who the #*%& Are You Really?" (Spanish: ¿Quién #%& eres en verdad?)	Pedro P. Ybarra & Kenya Márquez	Nayura Aragón, Gennys Pérez & Leticia López Margalli	2 February 2022
30	12	"The Twins" (Spanish: Los mellizos)	Pedro P. Ybarra & Kenya Márquez	Nayura Aragón, Gennys Pérez & Leticia López Margalli	2 February 2022
31	13	"A Perfect and Unbearable Triangle" (Spanish: Un perfecto triángulo insoportable)	Pedro P. Ybarra & Kenya Márquez	Nayura Aragón, Gennys Pérez & Leticia López Margalli	2 February 2022
32	14	"It Was Always You" (Spanish: Siempre fuiste tú)	Pedro P. Ybarra & Kenya Márquez	Nayura Aragón, Gennys Pérez & Leticia López Margalli	2 February 2022
33	15	"Facing the Darkness..." (Spanish: Enfrentar la oscuridad...)	Pedro P. Ybarra & Kenya Márquez	Nayura Aragón, Gennys Pérez & Leticia López Margalli	2 February 2022

== Awards and nominations ==
Year	Award	Category	Nominated	Result	Ref.
2020	GQ Men of the Year Awards	Mexican Actress of the Year	Maite Perroni	Won	
