= Pimpinero: Blood and Oil =

2024 film by Andrés Baiz

- Theatrical release poster
- Spanish: Pimpinero: Sangre y Gasolina
- Directed by: Andrés Baiz
- Written by: Andrés Baiz; María Camila Arias
- Produced by: Andrés Baiz; Andrés Calderón
- Starring: Alberto Guerra; Alejandro Speitzer; Laura Osma; Juanes
- Cinematography: Mateo Londoño
- Edited by: Luis Carballar
- Music by: Pedro Bromfman
- Production company: Dynamo
- Release dates: 9 September 2024 (TIFF); 10 October 2024 (Colombia)
- Running time: 121 minutes
- Country: Colombia
- Languages: Spanish; Wayuu

Pimpinero: Blood and Oil (Spanish: Pimpinero: Sangre y Gasolina) is a 2024 Colombian crime thriller film directed by Andrés Baiz. It stars Laura Osma, Alejandro Speitzer, Alberto Guerra, and Juanes. It premiered at the Toronto International Film Festival on 9 September 2024.

== Cast ==
- Alberto Guerra as Ulises
- Alejandro Speitzer as Juan
- Laura Osma as Diana
- Juanes as Moisés
- David Noreña as Don Carmelo
- Isabella Sierra as Juliana
- Junior González as Polito
- Emilia Ceballos as Marisol
- Yull Núñez as Fabián
- Juan Sebastián Calero as Miguel
- Ariel Sierra as Francisco
- Judith Segura as Blanca
- David Noreña as Don Carmelo
- Norberto Rivera as Evaristo
- Johan Rivera as Gonzo
- Nelson Camayo as Wielder
- Ángela Cano as Wendy
- Merilng Sosa as Piratas
- Paola López
- Nicol Juliana Rodríguez
- Julián Mondragón

== Production ==
The film was shot in Colombia, specifically Cesar and La Guajira, in 2023.

== Release ==
Promotional stills were released in August 2024. The trailer was released on 5 September 2024.

The film premiered at the Toronto International Film Festival on 9 September 2024.

== Reception ==
Carlos Aguilar of RogerEbert.com gave the film 2 out of 4 stars, praising cinematographer Mateo Londono for bringing "a grounded sumptuous to the visual relation between the people and the land", but criticized the film as having delved into several clichéd tropes of the genre, writing that Baiz was "more than fluent in these realms of the unlawful but struggles to craft characters and situations layered beyond superficial motivations."
