= Claudette Maillé =

Mexican actress

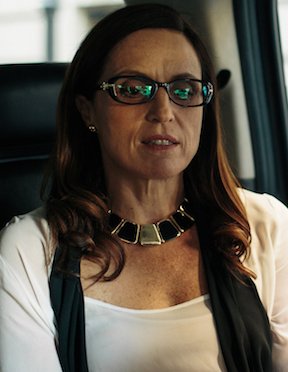
- Maillé as Ludmila in the Mexican web television series La Hermandad
- Born: 11 November 1964 (age 62); Mexico City, Mexico
- Occupation: Actress
- Years active: 1989–present

Claudette Maillé (born 11 November 1964) is a Mexican actress best known for her roles in Mexican telenovelas and films. She has won two Ariel awards, one in 1992 as Best Supporting Actress for her participation in the film Like Water for Chocolate (1991), and other in 1994 as Best Actress in the film Novia que te vea (1993).

== Early years ==
Maillé born in Mexico City, Mexico on 11 November 1964. Of French descent, Claudette was born in Mexico, but spent several years of her adolescence in France, next to her mother and her siblings. In France, she began to study dance and acting. At age 20, Maillé returned to Mexico, where she continued to study acting at National Autonomous University of Mexico, but as a result of the strike suffered by the university, she switched to the Núcleo de Estudios Teatrales.

== Filmography ==
=== Film roles ===
Year	Title	Roles	Notes
1991	No quiero discutir	Gabriela	Short film
1991	Bandidos	Secuestrada 1	Uncredited
1991	Ciudad de ciegos	Lourdes	
1991	Sólo con tu pareja	Burbus	
1991	Like Water for Chocolate	Gertrudis	
1993	Novia que te vea	Oshi Mataraso	
1995	Un hilito de sangre	Hortensia	
1996	Sucesos distantes	Gerente de Fábrica	
1998	Bajo California: El límite del tiempo	Husband	
2000	Antes que anochezca	María Luisa Lima	
2000	Crónica de un desayuno	Eugenia	
2002	Las caras de la luna	Annette	
2006	Only God Knows	Inés	
2006	Kilometer 31	Mom	
2007	Quemar las Naves	Eugenia	
2008	Nesio	Inma	
2010	Mano a mano	Teresa	Short film
2011	La última muerte	Sofía Alexanderson	
2012	Colosio: El asesinato	Clara	
2012	The Tears	Mother	
2013	Tlatelolco, verano del 68	Gloria	
2013	Sobre ella	Tere	
2014	Perfect Obedience	Señora Alcérreca	
2014	Huérfanos	Francisca Javiera	
2014	Happy Times	Max's mother	
2016	Treintona, soltera y fantástica	Renata	
2017	Bruma	Lucrecia	
2018	Hasta que la boda nos separe	Concha	
2019	The House of Flowers Presents: The Funeral	Roberta Maillé	Short film
2019	Perdida	Blanca	

=== Television roles ===
Year	Title	Roles	Notes
1995–1996	Retrato de familia	Ruth Vásquez	Recurring role; 26 episodes
1997	Gente bien	Ximena	Recurring role; 87 episodes
1997	Mujer, casos de la vida real	Various roles	3 episodes
1999	Yacaranday	Marcela	
2008	Secretos del alma	Amalia	
2010	Los Minondo	Mercedes Arguelles	Recurring role; 10 episodes
2010–2012	Capadocia	Mónica Acosta	Recurring role (seasons 2–3); 16 episodes
2012	XY	Débora	Episode: "Fidelidad, ¿Contra quién?"
2012–2013	Pacientes	Amanda	Main role; 43 episodes
2013–2016	La rosa de Guadalupe	Various roles	5 episodes
2013–2016	Como dice el dicho	Elvira Belinda Azucena	Episode: "Quien bien te quiere" Episode: "Por las hojas se conoce al tamal" Episode: "El que nace pa tamal, del cielo le caen las hojas"
2014	Camelia la Texana	Rosaura Pineda	Recurring role; 19 episodes
2015	El capitán Camacho	Gloria	
2015	Miss Dynamite	Alicia Cortés "La Pantera"	Main role; 39 episodes
2015	Amor de barrio	Delfina	Main role; 87 episodes
2016	La Hermandad	Ludmila Carrillo	Episode: "El regreso"
2016	Yago	Unknown role	Episode: "Chapter 19"
2017	La Doña	Delegada	Recurrgin role (season 1); 6 episodes
2017	Su nombre era Dolores	Laura Lucio	Recurrgin role; 7 episodes
2018–2020	The House of Flowers	Roberta Sánchez	Voice role (seasons 1–2); 23 episodes
2018	Falco	Elena Cota	Episode: "Bocanada"
2018	Atrapada	Renata Garay	Recurring role; 14 episodes
2018	Ingobernable	Ofelia Pereda	Recurring role (season 2); 8 episodes
2019	Tijuana	Federica	Recurring role (season 1); 11 episodes
2019	Rosario Tijeras	Vanesa	Recurring role (season 3); 6 episodes
2020	Enemigo íntimo	Elisa Torres	Main role (season 2)
2026	Doc	Dr. Fabiola Martínez	Main role
