= El Dandy (TV series) =

Television series

- Genre: Crime drama
- Based on: Donnie Brasco by Mike Newell
- Developed by: Flavio González Mello; Luis Mario Moncada
- Written by: Fernando Ábrego; Florencia Castillo; Rodrigo Ordoñez; Larissa Andrade; Fernanda Eguiarte; Tania Tinajero
- Directed by: Chava Cartas; Mauricio Cruz
- Creative director: Ana Magis
- Starring: Alfonso Herrera; Damián Alcázar; Gabriela Roel; Itahisa Machado
- Music by: Luis Carlos “Luca” Ortega; Camilo Froideval
- Country of origin: Mexico
- Original language: Spanish
- No. of seasons: 1
- No. of episodes: 70

Production
- Executive producers: Juan Pablo Posada; Gabriela Valentán; Daniel Ucros
- Cinematography: Patricio López; Santiago Sanchez; Luis Ávila
- Production companies: Sony Pictures Television International; Televisa S.A. de C.V.; Teleset

Original release
- Network: TNT Series
- Release: October 26, 2015 – March 9, 2016

El Dandy is a crime drama television series produced by Teleset for Sony Pictures Television and Televisa. It is based on the film Donnie Brasco directed by Mike Newell in 1997.

The series is written by Larissa Andrade and Rodrigo Ordoñez, and directed by Chava Cartas and Mauricio Cruz. Daniel Ucros and Gabriela Valentan are the Executive producers.

Starring by Alfonso Herrera, Damián Alcázar and Itahisa Machado.

== Plot ==
Inspired by the 1997 American drama Donnie Brasco, El Dandy tells the story of a law professor who has been hired by the Attorney General, to participate in a program of special operations, where he must infiltrate one of the most notorious drug cartels of Mexico City. Under the false name Daniel "El Dandy" Bracho (Alfonso Herrera), he begins the task of identifying all the members of this clandestine network. However, he quickly finds that his acute ability to police work is only comparable with the exciting sense of danger that experiences living life to the fullest. Along the way, it avails itself of the help of a criminal's petty, loyal, even corrupt, ally called El Chueco (Damián Alcázar), who quickly befriends Bracho and comes dangerously close to discover his true identity. Much deeper, Bracho is involved in the mafia, more work tells him to get out, and the professor, once incorruptible, has to choose between returning to a normal life as a respectable citizen or fully embrace his criminal life.

== Cast ==
=== Main ===
- Alfonso Herrera as Daniel "El Dandy" Bracho / José "Pepe" Montaño
- Damián Alcázar as Juan Antonio Ramírez / El Chueco
- Gabriela Roel as María Luisa
- Itahisa Machado as Leticia Albarrán
- Aleyda Gallardo as Fidela
- Danny Perea as Dr. Itzel / Noemí
- Francisco Pakey as El Esquimal
- Fátima Molina as Deyanira
- Héctor Holten as Procurador
- Carlos Valencia as Díaz
- Amorita Rasgado as Amaranta
- Aketza López as Jorge
- Elba Jiménez as Marcela
- Alejandro de Marino as Carlos Galindo / El Menonita
- Jerónimo Fernández as unknown
- Julia Urbini as Emilia

=== Recurring ===
- Roberto Carlo as Jacques Jr.
- Alejandro Speitzer as Serch
- Oliver Avendaño as Richi Díaz
- Luis de Alba as Ecadio
- Claudio Roca as Diego Durand
- Ana Laverde as Primavera

=== Special participation ===
- Dagoberto Gama as José Luis Zamacona / El Negro
- Hernán Mendoza as La Güera
- Daniel Martínez as Filiberto Ortega
- Christian Vazquez as Toño

== Broadcast ==
The series airs in Latin America on TNT Series, where it premiered on October 26, 2015. The series premiered on TNT on October 30, 2015, and summarizes weekly every Friday.
