= The Tears (film) =

- Film poster
- Directed by: Pablo Delgado
- Written by: Pablo Delgado
- Produced by: Ericka Lavin; Guillermo Ortiz Pichardo
- Starring: Fernando Álvarez Rebeil; Gabriel Santoyo
- Production company: Centro de Capacitación Cinematográfica
- Distributed by: Cineteca Nacional
- Release dates: October 26, 2012 (MIFF); January 2013 (IFFR)
- Running time: 64 minutes
- Country: Mexico
- Language: Spanish

The Tears (Spanish: Las lágrimas) is a 2012 Mexican drama film written and directed by Pablo Delgado in his directorial debut. It features Fernando Álvarez Rebeil and Gabriel Santoyo.

== Synopsis ==
2 brothers, Fernando and Gabriel, decide to escape for a weekend to a forest due to their problematic family. There Gabriel will witness the self-destruction of his older brother.

== Cast ==
The actors participating in this film are:

- Fernando Álvarez Rebeil as Fernando
- Gabriel Santoyo as Gabriel
- Claudette Maillé as Mother

== Production ==
=== Script ===
The script took 5 days to complete, most of the film used the improvisation technique between the main actors.

=== Financing ===
The Tears had a budget of $30,000 provided by the Cinematographic Training Center (CCC) to start filming. The film received $10,300 as a prize from the Locarno International Film Festival to finish the post-production process.

=== Filming ===
Principal photography lasted 15 days, 7 in Mexico City and 8 in Valle de Bravo.

== Release ==
The Tears had an initial release on October 26, 2012, as part of the Morelia International Film Festival, before having its world premiere at the end of January 2013 as part of the Bright Futures section at the 42nd Rotterdam International Film Festival.

== Accolades ==
Year	Award / Festival	Category	Recipient	Result	Ref.
2012	Locarno International Film Festival	Carte Blanche Award	The Tears	Won	
2013	International Film Festival of Cartagena de Indias	Official Fiction Competition - Special Mention	The Tears	Won	
2013	Cinélatino Rencontres de Toulouse	Official Competition - Special Mention	The Tears	Won	
2013	Rencontres Henri-Langlois	Jury's Grand Prize	The Tears	Won	
2013	Havana Film Festival	Best First Work - Special Mention	The Tears	Won	
2014	World Extreme Film Festival Veracruz	Special Award	The Tears	Won	
2014	Punta del Este International Film Festival	Best Emerging Director - Honorable Mention	Pablo Delgado	Won	
2014	BioBioCine Festival Internacional	Best Fiction Feature by a School	The Tears	Won	
