= Leonardo Daniel =

Mexican actor and director

- Born: Leonardo Daniel López de Rodas García; 26 July 1954 (age 71); Mexico City, Mexico
- Occupation(s): Actor, director
- Years active: 1974-present
- Parent: Lorenzo de Rodas

Leonardo Daniel (Spanish pronunciation: [leoˈnaɾðo ðaˈnjel]; born 26 July 1954) is a Mexican actor and director. His real name is Leonardo Daniel López de Rodas García.

== Family ==
His parents were Lorenzo de Rodas and María Idalia.

== Filmography ==
Television performance
Year	Title	Roles	Notes
1974	Mundo de juguete	Aldo	
1975	Pobre Clara		
1977	Yo no pedí vivir	Manuel	
1977	Humillados y ofendidos	Alejandro Correa	
1978	María José	Alfredo	
1979–1980	Los ricos también lloran	Leonardo Mendizabal	
1980	Juventud	Pablo	
1980	Ambición	Alfredo	
1981	El hogar que yo robé	Eduardo	
1983	Chispita	Juan Carlos de la Mora	
1983–1984	La fiera	Miguel Martínez Bustamante	
1984–1985	Sí, mi amor	David Kendall	Main role; 30 episodes
1984–1986	Principessa	Federico	
1985	Juana Iris		
1986	Seducción	Julio	
1987	Como duele callar	José Luis	
1988	Rosa salvaje	Enrique Molina	
1988	Encadenados	Daniel	
1989	Papá soltero		Episode: "Máscaras"
1992	De frente al sol	Young Adrián Bermúdez	
1992	Baila conmigo		
1994	Agujetas de color de rosa	Miguel Davis	
1995	María José	Octavio Campuzano	
1995	María la del Barrio	Hinojosa	
1996	Cañaveral de pasiones	Fausto Santos	
1996	La antorcha encendida	Juan Aldama	
1997	El secreto de Alejandra	Sergio Duval	Main role; 25 episodes
1998	Azul Tequila	Mariano De Icaza	
1999	Háblame de amor	Aguilar	
2001	Lo que callamos las mujeres	Jorge Rogelio	Episode: "Con la misma moneda" Episode: "Como si fueran mis hijos"
2001	Cuando seas mía	Joaquín Sánchez Serrano	
2002–2003	La duda	Daniel	
2002	Agua y aceite	Héctor	
2003	Rebeca	Adalberto Santander	
2004	Inocente de ti	Filemón	Also as director
2006	Las dos caras de Ana	Humberto Bustamante	
2006	Mi vida eres tú	Mario Andrés Álvarez	
2008	Valeria	Renato Rivera	
2009	Más sabe el diablo	Aníbal Dávila	Recurring role
2009	Pobre Diabla	Diego Montenegro	
2009	Alma indomable	Rogelio Sorrento	
2012	Corazón valiente	Darío Sandoval	Recurring role
2013	Rosario	Marcos Miranda	
2013	Dama y obrero	Mariano Santamaría	Recurring role
2014	Amor sin reserva	Luis Cisneros	
2015	El capitán Camacho	Dimitrio León	
2015–2016	El Señor de los Cielos	Don Alfredo "Feyo" Aguilera	Recurring role (seasons 3–4); 164 episodes
2016–2017	El Vato	Emiliano Galeana	Recurring role (seasons 1–2); 6 episodes
2016–2017	El Chema	Don Alfredo "Feyo" Aguilera	Recurring role (season 1); 29 episodes
2017	La hija pródiga	Federico Campomanes Soto	Recurring role; 13 episodes
2017	Milagros de Navidad	Don José Romero	Episode: "Hermanos"
2018	Enemigo íntimo	Comandante David Gómez	Main role (season 1); guest role (season 2)
2018	Mi familia perfecta	El Mono	Recurring role; 5 episodes
2019	Yankee	Carlos Revueltas	Recurring role; 6 episodes
2019	Cuna de lobos	Carlos Larios	Main role; 25 episodes
2021	Vencer el pasado	Lisandro Mascaró	Main role
2022	La herencia	Severiano del Monte	Guest role
2022–2023	Mi camino es amarte	Eugenio Zambrano	Main role
2023–2024	Vuelve a mí	José María "Chema" Mercado	Recurring role
2024	El ángel de Aurora	Miguel Campero	Guest role
2025	Velvet: El nuevo imperio	Emilio Velázquez	Main role
