= Rosario (2013 TV series) =

- Genre: Telenovela
- Created by: Alex Hadad
- Directed by: María Eugenia Perera; Arquímedes Rivero; Otto Rodríguez; Carlos Santos
- Creative director: Raúl de la Nuez
- Starring: Guy Ecker; Itahisa Machado; Aarón Díaz; Lorena Rojas
- Opening theme: "Rosario" by Manolo Ramos
- Original language: Spanish
- No. of seasons: 1
- No. of episodes: 107

Production
- Executive producers: Peter Tinoco; Carlos Sotomayor
- Producers: Dulce Terán; Cristina De La Parra
- Production locations: Miami, Florida
- Cinematography: Eduardo Dávila
- Editor: Orlando Manzo
- Camera setup: Multi-camera
- Production companies: Univision Studios; Venevisión International

Original release
- Network: Univision
- Release: January 28 – August 16, 2013

Rosario (Spanish pronunciation: [roˈsaɾjo]) is a 2013 Spanish-language telenovela produced by Venevisión International in collaboration with United States–based television network Univision. It is an original story written by Alex Haddad. The production started on July 31, 2012.

On April 26, 2012, it was confirmed that Alex Haddad would write Rosario. On July 24, it was confirmed that Lupita Jones will make her acting debut. Both Zuleyka Rivera and Lorena Rojas will star as the antagonists. Guy Ecker and Itahisa Machado will star as the main protagonists.

== Plot ==
A beautiful and intelligent young woman named Rosario (Itahisa Machado) falls in love with her boss, Alejandro (Guy Ecker), a prominent lawyer twenty-one years older than she. Rosario does not know that Alejandro is the same man whose mother, Magdalena (Natalia Ramírez), was engaged to marry twenty-one years ago; Magdalena has kept her romance with Alejandro in secret. In the past, Alejandro broke his engagement to Magdalena on learning that she had become pregnant with Marcos (Leonardo Daniel) as a result of rape. Alejandro, convinced that he could never accept, nor love, a creature that was begotten by his worst enemy decides to abandon it. The irony is that years later that child, Rosario, would become the great love of his life. The love of a young woman for the man she should never have fallen in love with; the love of a man towards the woman he swore he could never love; and the conflict of a mother when she meets the man she was about to marry and who is currently her daughter's boyfriend.

== Cast ==
Confirmed as of July 31, 2012.

- Itahisa Machado as Rosario Pérez
- Guy Ecker as Alejandro Montalbán
- Aarón Díaz as Esteban Martínez
- Lorena Rojas as Priscila Pavón
- Natalia Ramirez as Magdalena Pérez
- Ezequiel Montalt as Daniel Carvajal
- Zully Montero as Regina Montalbán
- Frances Ondiviela as Teresa Martínez
- Zuleyka Rivera as Sandra Díaz
- Rodrigo Vidal as Padre Bernardo
- Tina Romero as Griselda
- Anna Silvetti as Caridad Chávez
- Gledys Ibarra as Antonia
- Lupita Jones as Fabiana
- Franklin Virgüez as Vicente
- Alberto Salaberri as Jeronimo Guerra
- Liliana Rodriguez as Ofilia Elsa
- Scarlet Gruber as Cecilia Garza
- Sandra Itzel as Barbara Montalbán
- Greydis Gil as Silvia Villalobos
- Adrián Di Monte as Ignacio "Nacho" Gómez
- Christina Mason as Misericordia "Merci"
- Sergio Reynoso as Manuel Pérez
- Beatriz Monroy as Matilde
- Carlos Garin as Guillermo Gómez
- Juan Jiménez as Felipe
- Fabiola Barinas as Zulema Torres
- Leonardo Daniel as Marcos Miranda
- Osvaldo Strongoli as Gregorio Giorgano
- Lilimar Hernandez as Elenita
- Samuel Sadovnik as Esteban Martínez Jr.
- Nataniel Roman as Manny
- Alberto Barros Jr. as the gardener
- Melody Batule as Dr. Natalia
- Luz Cordeiro as Sor Esperanza
- Reinaldo Cruz as Renato Villalobos
- Alexander Estrella as Beto
- Shanik Hughes as Cynthia
- Ramon Morell as Dr. Lozada
- Jorge Luis Portales as Matias
- Elioret Silva as Detective Evora
- Soledad Esponda as Mariana
- Eslover Sanchez-Baquero as David (Fabiana's producer)
- Victoria Zapata as Señora Silvestre
- Laura Aleman as Cristina
- Nadia Escobar as Carmencita

== International release ==
Country	Network(s)	Series premiere	Series finale	Title	Weekly schedule	Timeslot
Ecuador	TC Television	January 28, 2013	August 16, 2013	Rosario	Monday to Friday	1:30 pm
Chile	Chilevisión	February 24, 2013	present	Rosario	Monday to Friday	3:00 pm
Nicaragua	Televicentro	April 1, 2013	August 27, 2013	Rosario	Monday to Friday	3:00 pm
Estonia	Kanal 2	June 3, 2013	October 28, 2013	Rosario	Monday to Friday	17:05
Mexico	TV Azteca	August 19, 2013	January 10, 2014	Rosario	Monday to Friday	4:00 pm
Lithuania	TV3	September 2, 2013	March 28, 2014	Rosarija	Monday to Friday	15:00
Romania	Acasa TV Gold	1 mai 2017	15 aug 2017	Rosario	Everyday	20:30
Uruguay	Canal 10	Coming Soon	Coming Soon	Rosario	Monday to Friday	8:15 pm
Paraguay	Canal 13	Coming Soon	Coming Soon	Rosario	Monday to Friday	8:30 pm
United States	Estrella TV	January 2016	N/A	Rosario	Monday to Friday	7pm/6c
