= Matías Novoa =

Chilean actor and model (born 1980)

- Born: Matías Novoa Burgos; June 14, 1980 (age 45); Valparaíso, Chile
- Occupations: Actor, model
- Years active: 2008–present
- Spouses: Daniela Castillo (m. 2006; div. 2008) Isabella Castillo (m. 2019; div. 2021) Michelle Renaud (m. 2023)

Matías Novoa Burgos (born 14 June 1980) is a Chilean actor and model, based in Mexico.

He is known for working with TV Azteca doing telenovelas.

== Personal life ==
He was married to Cuban actress and singer Isabella Castillo from 2019 to 2021. He had a son with the Venezuelan actress María José Magán, born on 12 May 2011, called Axel Novoa Gómez.

== Filmography ==
Film roles
Year	Title	Roles	Notes
2015	Reverse	Unknown role	Short film; also as executive producer and co-writer
2019	Doblemente embarazada	Felipe	

Television roles
Year	Title	Roles	Notes
2008	Secretos del alma	Efrén	
2009	Mujer comprada	Germán	
2010	Quiéreme tonto	Juan Diego Cruz	
2011	Bajo el alma	Diego Cavazos	
2012	La Teniente	Teniente Nicolás Alejo	Main role; 24 episodes
2013	Hombre tenías que ser	Pablo Cantú	
2015–2016	Tanto amor	David Roldán	
2017	Nada personal	Comandante Santiago Leal	
2017	Dos lagos	David	7 episodes
2018–2020	Enemigo íntimo	Daniel Laborde / Eduardo Tapia "El Tilapia"	Main role (season 1); 53 episodes and guest star (season 2); 1 episodes
2018–2020	El Señor de los Cielos	Amado Leal "El Águila Azul" / Amado Casillas	Main role (season 6–7)
2020	La Doña	Amado Leal "El Águila Azul" / Amado Casillas	Episodes: "Detrás de la venganza" and "Nuevos socios"
2021	Vencer el pasado	Claudio Fonseti	Recurring role
2022	La herencia	Juan del Monte	Main role
2022	'Til Jail Do Us Part	Pablo	Main role
2022	La Reina del Sur	Nacho Duarte	Recurring role (season 3)
2022	Cabo	Alejandro	Main role
2023	Vencer la culpa	Pablo	Main role
2024	Marea de pasiones	Marcelo	Main role
2026	El renacer de Luna	Sebastián	Main role
