= Valentina Acosta =

Colombian actor

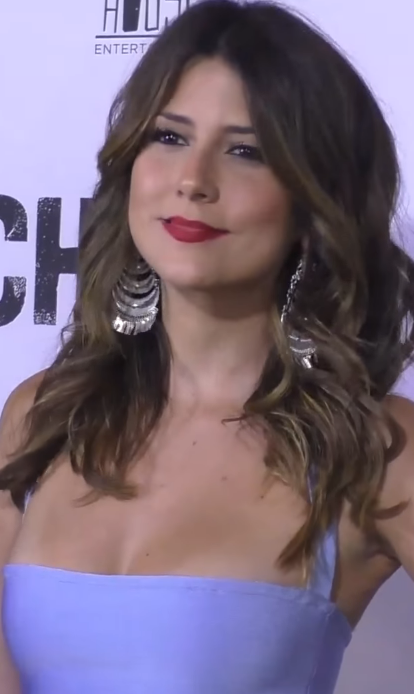
- Acosta at the Premiere Of Univison's El Chapo at Landmark Theatre in Los Angeles
- Born: Valentina Acosta Restrepo; July 23, 1982 (age 42); Bogota, Colombia
- Occupation(s): Actress, model
- Years active: 1999–present

Valentina Acosta (born July 23, 1982), is a Colombian television actress, presenter and model.

== Filmography ==
=== Films ===
Year	Title	Role	Notes
2012	Carrusel	Catalina	
2016	El juego del amor	Alma	
2025	Dora and the Search for Sol Dorado	Dora's mother	

=== Television ===
Year	Title	Role	Notes
1999	Francisco el matemático	Alejandra	
2000	Se armó la gorda	Karina Santos	
2003	Un ángel llamado azul	Flora	
2004	Luna, la heredera	Alicia	
2005	Lorena	Tatiana	
2006	Merlina mujer divina	Merlina González	
2006	Amas de casa desesperadas	Lucía	
2007	El Zorro, la espada y la rosa	Selenia	
2008	La sucursal del cielo	Soledad Belalcázar	
2008	La Dama de Troya	Nena Fontalvo	
2010	Los caballeros las prefieren brutas	Luna	2 episodes
2010–2012	A mano limpia	Silvia Pizarro	Lead role
2014	The Bridge	Young Girl	Episode: "Lamia"
2014–2016	Señora Acero	Miriam Godoy	132 episodes
2016–2017	Perseguidos	Connie	22 episodes
2017	El Chapo	Alejandra	8 episodes
2017	Érase una vez	Noemí	Episode: "La bella y la bestia"
2018	Enemigo íntimo	Olivia Reyes	
2024	Accidente - Netflix	Brenda	
