= Enemigo íntimo =

American television series

- Genre: Telenovela
- Written by: Enrique Rentería; Hubert Barrero; Víctor Huizar; Gustavo Moheno; Ángel Pulido
- Story by: Hubert Barrero
- Directed by: Felipe Aguilar; Danny Gavidia
- Creative director: Olín Díaz
- Music by: Álvaro Arce
- Country of origin: United States
- Original language: Spanish
- No. of seasons: 2
- No. of episodes: 113

Production
- Executive producer: Mariana Iskandariani
- Producer: Mariu Fernández
- Production locations: Zürich, Switzerland; Mexico City, Mexico; United States
- Cinematography: Beatriz Pérez Barboza; Diana Lisem Mendonza
- Editors: Perla Martínez; Macorix Perera
- Camera setup: Multi-camera
- Production companies: Argos Comunicación; Telemundo Global Studios

Original release
- Network: Telemundo
- Release: 21 February 2018 – 21 September 2020

Enemigo íntimo (in English: "Intimate Enemy") is a Spanish-language telenovela that premiered on Telemundo on 21 February 2018 and ended on 21 September 2020. Produced by Telemundo Global Studios and Argos Comunicación and distributed by Telemundo Internacional.

The series tells the story of two siblings separated when they were small children and who were united years later. Both ignore that they have many things in common, the same parents, a happy childhood and a great crime that separated them. He has never stopped looking for her and she now she has no memories and now fate puts them face to face in a war without quarter.

On 7 May 2018, Telemundo confirmed that the show has been renewed for a second season. The production of the second season began on 9 September 2019.

== Plot ==
=== Season 1 (2018) ===
The season follows the story of two siblings who witness the murder of their parents in the hands of one of the drug cartels in Mexico, after this murder, Roxana Rodiles (Fernanda Castillo) the younger sister of Alejandro Ferrer (Raúl Méndez) is kidnapped. 25 years later, Alejandro Ferrer is now the captain of the Federal Police and only seeks revenge against the narcos for destroying his family. Roxana that after 25 years disappeared and ignoring that her brother is Alejandro enters a business of buying and selling diamonds. However, everything will be reduced when the interpol that silently followed the trail of money tries to capture it. After being detained and interrogated, Roxana enters the prison of Las Dunas, a boarding school with almost unique characteristics throughout Mexico, since it simultaneously houses, although in different pavilions, men and women deprived of liberty for being accused or condemned. for the most diverse crimes. Alejandro knowing this is responsible for sending Daniel Laborde (Matías Novoa), as an infiltrated agent who will try to fall in love with Roxana to obtain information, after several misunderstandings between the two siblings and without knowing they are relatives, they will try to destroy the narcos.

=== Season 2 (2020) ===
The second season takes place two years after the first season. Roxana (Fernanda Castillo), who can no longer hide under the alias of "El Profesor", will fight to reestablish the Mil Cumbres cartel and grow her empire, but Alejandro (Raúl Méndez), commander of the Anti-Drug Unit, will not be willing to leave her now that he knows that "El Profesor" and her missing sister are the same person. These conflicts between opposing sides unleashed a war of revenge between two blood brothers, now turned into worse enemies.

== Cast and characters ==
=== Main ===
==== Introduced in season 1 ====
- Raúl Méndez as Alejandro Ferrer (seasons 1–2)
- Fernanda Castillo as Roxana Rodiles (seasons 1–2)
- Matías Novoa as Daniel Laborde / Eduardo Tapia "El Tilapia" (season 1; guest season 2)
- Rafael Sánchez Navarro as Leopoldo Borges
- Guillermo Quintanilla as Anselmo López "Guillotina"
- Leonardo Daniel as Commander David Gómez (season 1; guest season 2)
- Otto Sirgo as Nemesio Rendón
- Alejandro Speitzer as Luis Rendón "El Berebere" (season 1; guest season 2)
- Armando Hernández as Héctor Fernández "Colmillo"
- Samadhi Zendejas as María Antonia Reyes "Mamba"
- Valentina Acosta as Olivia Reyes
- Itahisa Machado as Marimar Rubio
- Elvira Monsell as Zoraida
- Mayra Rojas as Clarisa
- Alpha Acosta as Minerva Zambrano
- Mar Zamora as Ochún
- María del Carmen Félix as Ana Mercedes Calicio "La Puma" (seasons 1–2), a lesbian woman.
- Mauricio Rousselon as Robaldo Bolado "El Bowser"
- Natalia Benvenuto as Puki
- Alan Ciangherotti as Bernardo Rendón "El Buitre"
- Tania Niebla as Tamara
- Miguel René Moreno as Lieutenant Gabriel Puenzo
- René García as Priamo Cabrales
- Francisco Calvillo as Rafael Mantilla Moreno "El Patojo"
- Diego Soldano as Federico Montalvo
- Flavio Peniche as Pedro Bencomo Saldivia "Sanson"
- Sandra Benhumea as Lula Pineda
- Rafael Nieves as Lieutenant Carlos Muñán
- Mónica Jiménez as Eladia Cornejo
- Iván Aragón as Juan Romero "El Chamaco"
- Jean Paul Leroux as Ángel Cordero
- Roberto Uscanga as Fermín Pedraza "El Cristero"
- Eduardo Reza as Gibrán Mendiola

==== Introduced in season 2 ====
- Aitor Luna as Martín Ustariz
- Irán Castillo as Carmen Govea
- Manuel Ojeda as Don Jesús
- Elyfer Torres as Alicia García
- Luis Alberti as Javier Rivera
- Tiago Correa as Diego Lozano
- Germán Bracco as Manuel Salas
- Amaranta Ruiz as Gladys Bernal "La Mariscala"
- Erick Chapa as Arturo Morillo
- Yuvanna Montalvo as Karla Padilla
- Arturo García Tenorio as Díaz
- Claudette Maillé as Elisa Torres
- Héctor Kotsifakis as Héctor Moreno "El Sargento"
- Ruy Senderos as Ricardo Medina
- Julio Casado as Raúl Ortega "El Habanero"
- Jorge Gallegos as Alan Rodríguez
- Luis Zahera as El Gallego
- Tony Plana as Santilla

== Television ratings ==
Viewership and ratings per season of Enemigo íntimo
Season	Episodes	First aired		Last aired		Avg. viewers (millions)
Season	Episodes	Date	Viewers (millions)	Date	Viewers (millions)	Avg. viewers (millions)
1	53	21 February 2018	1.72	7 May 2018	1.63	1.46
2	60	22 June 2020	0.96	21 September 2020	1.19	0.81

== Episodes ==
=== Series overview ===
Series	Episodes	Originally released	
Series	Episodes	First released	Last released
1	53	21 February 2018	7 May 2018
2	60	22 June 2020	21 September 2020

=== Season 1 (2018) ===
No. overall	No. in season	Title	Original release date	US viewers (millions)
1	1	"Caminos opuestos"	21 February 2018	1.72
2	2	"Alejandro interroga a Roxana"	22 February 2018	1.40
3	3	"Una riña sangrienta"	23 February 2018	1.49
4	4	"Batalla campal"	26 February 2018	1.61
5	5	"El Tilapia arranca su misión"	27 February 2018	1.48
6	6	"Roxana atraída por El Tilapia"	28 February 2018	1.56
7	7	"Roxana acusada de un incendio"	1 March 2018	1.50
8	8	"Tilapia mata a un reo"	2 March 2018	1.47
9	9	"Roxana y Tilapia hacen el amor"	5 March 2018	1.54
10	10	"Roxana y Ochún son cómplices"	6 March 2018	1.42
11	11	"Toman de rehén a Alejandro"	7 March 2018	1.27
12	12	"Piden la cabeza de Roxana"	8 March 2018	1.49
13	13	"Roxana descubre la traición"	9 March 2018	1.24
14	14	"Guillotina protege a Roxana"	12 March 2018	1.42
15	15	"Noche de pasión en Las Dunas"	13 March 2018	1.37
16	16	"Tilapia confronta a Bowser"	14 March 2018	1.31
17	17	"Guillotina visita a Roxana"	15 March 2018	1.42
18	18	"Roxana confronta a Alejandro"	16 March 2018	1.46
19	19	"Roxana sale de Las Dunas"	19 March 2018	1.43
20	20	"Roxana se enfrenta a Zoraida"	20 March 2018	1.56
21	21	"Sacan a La Puma del reclusorio"	21 March 2018	1.52
22	22	"Visita conyugal con Guillotina"	22 March 2018	1.49
23	23	"Tilapia se desquita con Bowser"	23 March 2018	1.29
24	24	"Roxana y Tilapia a escondidas"	26 March 2018	1.34
25	25	"Madre recibe la orden"	27 March 2018	1.29
26	26	"Tilapia derrota a Guillotina"	28 March 2018	1.45
27	27	"Roxana es hija de Don Nemesio"	29 March 2018	1.49
28	28	"Roxana y Tilapia se mienten"	30 March 2018	1.29
29	29	"Borges cae por orden de Roxana"	2 April 2018	1.41
30	30	"Madre ve a Roxana con Daniel"	3 April 2018	1.33
31	31	"El Bere Bere visita a Roxana"	4 April 2018	1.52
32	32	"Tilapia sonsaca a Roxana"	5 April 2018	1.48
33	33	"Desafío sexual para Daniel"	6 April 2018	1.28
34	34	"Los Oscuros matan a Príamo"	9 April 2018	1.49
35	35	"Roxana ya no tiene aliado"	10 April 2018	1.47
36	36	"Ferrer es inhabilitado"	11 April 2018	1.33
37	37	"Matan a Marimar como venganza"	12 April 2018	1.32
38	38	"Tilapia mata a Bowser"	13 April 2018	1.37
39	39	"Ferrer descubre la verdad"	16 April 2018	1.54
40	40	"Tilapia mata a otro recluso"	17 April 2018	1.46
41	41	"Madre intenta violar a Roxana"	18 April 2018	1.64
42	42	"Roxana ordena matar a Madre"	19 April 2018	1.64
43	43	"Ochún no puede matar a Roxana"	20 April 2018	1.46
44	44	"Tilapia apuñala a Guillotina"	23 April 2018	1.61
45	45	"Los reos amenazan a Tilapia"	24 April 2018	1.49
46	46	"Roxana y Tilapia en libertad"	25 April 2018	1.52
47	47	"Daniel abandona la misión"	27 April 2018	1.41
48	48	"Daniel en los Mil Cumbres"	30 April 2018	1.49
49	49	"Daniel no coopera con Ferrer"	1 May 2018	1.40
50	50	"Daniel traiciona a Roxana"	2 May 2018	1.58
51	51	"Roxana acaba con Las Dunas"	3 May 2018	1.46
52	52	"Guillotina contra Mil Cumbres"	4 May 2018	1.42
53	53	"Llega El Profesor"	7 May 2018	1.63

=== Season 2 (2020) ===
No. overall	No. in season	Title (Note: The titles and air date of each episode are obtained through the DirecTV guide in English. For a comprehensive record you can visit the NBC page.)	Original release date	US viewers (millions)
54	1	"Obsesión"	22 June 2020	0.96
55	2	"La trampa"	23 June 2020	0.82
56	3	"Cooperación internacional"	24 June 2020	0.90
57	4	"La más buscada"	25 June 2020	0.81
58	5	"Vía de escape"	26 June 2020	0.71
59	6	"Llegó la hora"	29 June 2020	0.80
60	7	"El poder tras las rejas"	30 June 2020	0.81
61	8	"Motín en Las Dunas"	1 July 2020	0.84
62	9	"Visita relámpago"	2 July 2020	0.68
63	10	"Una brillante idea"	6 July 2020	0.82
64	11	"Luz verde"	7 July 2020	0.67
65	12	"La enviada"	8 July 2020	0.77
66	13	"El enlace"	9 July 2020	0.77
67	14	"La misión de Alicia"	13 July 2020	0.75
68	15	"El alcance del negocio"	14 July 2020	0.70
69	16	"El gran golpe"	15 July 2020	0.70
70	17	"Se desata la guerra"	16 July 2020	0.68
71	18	"Veinticuatro horas para matar"	20 July 2020	0.71
72	19	"La revancha"	21 July 2020	0.86
73	20	"La confesión"	22 July 2020	0.84
74	21	"Siembra la droga"	23 July 2020	0.82
75	22	"Alejandro es el blanco"	24 July 2020	0.61
76	23	"Es el gran día"	27 July 2020	0.91
77	24	"Maniobras"	28 July 2020	0.72
78	25	"Directo al matadero"	29 July 2020	0.69
79	26	"A pedir de boca"	30 July 2020	0.79
80	27	"El traidor"	31 July 2020	0.69
81	28	"La entrega"	3 August 2020	0.75
82	29	"Engaño"	4 August 2020	0.75
83	30	"Una noche fuera del negocio"	5 August 2020	0.81
84	31	"A cualquier precio"	6 August 2020	0.76
85	32	"Tras la pista del soplón"	7 August 2020	0.76
86	33	"Juego de poder"	10 August 2020	0.95
87	34	"La trampa"	11 August 2020	0.85
88	35	"Ruta de escape"	12 August 2020	0.90
89	36	"El secuestro"	13 August 2020	0.85
90	37	"El teléfono es clave"	14 August 2020	0.73
91	38	"Alicia como espía"	17 August 2020	0.82
92	39	"Olor a muerte"	18 August 2020	0.84
93	40	"El dato"	19 August 2020	0.80
94	41	"La prueba del delito"	21 August 2020	0.80
95	42	"Al filo de la muerte"	24 August 2020	0.77
96	43	"Pesca en río revuelto"	25 August 2020	0.87
97	44	"Encadenado"	26 August 2020	1.00
98	45	"El nuevo orden en Las Dunas"	28 August 2020	0.79
99	46	"El negocio se viene abajo"	1 September 2020	0.74
100	47	"Contrareloj"	2 September 2020	0.80
101	48	"Rodeados"	3 September 2020	0.77
102	49	"Todos contra Los Zopilotes"	4 September 2020	0.85
103	50	"La ruta del Cóndor"	7 September 2020	0.79
104	51	"Inyección mortal"	8 September 2020	0.84
105	52	"A la cama con Don Jesús"	9 September 2020	0.72
106	53	"La otra salida"	10 September 2020	0.93
107	54	"El negocio apesta"	11 September 2020	0.79
108	55	"La lista de los 123"	14 September 2020	0.74
109	56	"Explota el escándalo"	15 September 2020	0.85
110	57	"Relevo en Los Mil Cumbres"	16 September 2020	0.87
111	58	"El error de Díaz"	17 September 2020	0.97
112	59	"El traslado"	18 September 2020	0.92
113	60	"El intercambio"	21 September 2020	1.19
