= Rosario Tijeras (Mexican TV series) season 1 =

Rosario Tijeras
- Season 1
- Starring: Bárbara de Regil; José María de Tavira; Antonio Gaona
- No. of episodes: 60

Release
- Original network: Azteca 13
- Original release: 30 October 2016 – 30 January 2017

Season chronology
- Next → Season 2

The first season of the Mexican television series Rosario Tijeras, created by Adriana Pelusi and Carlos Quintanilla, follows the story of a beautiful woman, from one of the poorest and most dangerous neighborhoods in Mexico City. The season premiered on 30 October 2016 and concluded on 30 January 2017. Production of the season began in July 2016.

In the United States the season premiered on 27 June 2017 on Univision, and later moved to UniMás due to low ratings, where it concluded on 24 September 2017.

== Plot ==
This is the story of a beautiful young woman, victim of an abuse that marked her life and made her develop a dark vision of love. Constantly battered, harassed and assaulted by those around her, she becomes the legendary and deadly "Rosario Tijeras", a dangerous woman, born of the slums. When she meets two boys from a higher social class, she falls in love with both of them. Though she lives worlds apart from their wealth and luxury, her beauty and street smarts prove irresistible as she pulls them into her subculture of violence, revenge, and danger.

== Cast ==
=== Main ===
- Bárbara de Regil as Rosario Tijeras
- José María de Tavira as Antonio Bethancourt
- Antonio Gaona as Emilio Echegaray
- Hernán Mendoza as León Elías Arteaga
- Vanessa Bauche as Ruby
- Christian Vázquez as Ferney / Fierro
- José Sefami as Gonzalo González / El General
- Ariel López Padilla as Camilo Echegaray
- Hugo Albores as Cristóbal
- Sophie Gómez as Marta de Bethancourt
- Rocío Verdejo as Susana
- María Fernanda Quiroz as Yolanda
- Ariana Ron Pedrique as Paula Restrepo
- Pakey Vázquez as Tobías
- Dino García as Leonardo
- Alexa Martín as Leticia Bethancourt
- Pia Watson as Samantha
- Pascacio López as El Peludo
- Ruy Senderos as Damián González
- Eduardo Victoria as Luis Enrique Bethancourt
- Luis Alberti as Brandon López Morales

=== Recurring ===
- Erick Chapa as Juan José
- Luz Ramos as Rocío
- Giuseppe Gamba as Sudarsky
- Alonso Espeleta as Chávez

== Episodes ==
No. overall	No. in season	Title	Mexico air date	U.S. air date	US viewers (millions)
1	1	"Rosario le roba un beso a Antonio al conocerlo"	30 October 2016	27 June 2017	1.39
The destiny causes that Rosario and Antonio meet each other in an unequaled way, she steals a kiss from him being only a stranger.
2	2	"Rosario impide que su padrastro abuse de ella"	31 October 2016	28 June 2017	1.11
The altercation between Rosario and her stepfather only makes Ruby believe in Cristobal's words.
3	3	"Rosario le salva la vida a El General tras sufrir un ataque respiratorio"	1 November 2016	29 June 2017	1.15
Brandon sees Rosario working with Cristobal. Antonio asks Emilio to accompany him to find the girl with the 'scissors'.
4	4	"Antonio salvó a Rosario y evitó que Cacho abusara de ella"	2 November 2016	30 June 2017	1.12
Antonio is still in search of Rosario, he has not been able to get her out of his head.
5	5	"Rosario le disparó a Cacho para evitar que abusara de ella"	3 November 2016	3 July 2017	1.06
Robinson warns Emilio to stay away from his wife. Delia tells her mother that she will not return to school.
6	6	"Rosario fue arrestada por ser parte del crimen organizado"	4 November 2016	4 July 2017	0.81
The doctor informs Leticia that she is not pregnant and she is very happy. Police arrest Rosario for selling stolen cell phones.
7	7	"Ruby impidió que su hija Rosario pasara una noche con El General"	7 November 2016	5 July 2017	1.06
One of Gonzalo's men tries to take Rosario with him, but Ruby defends her. Yolanda advises Delia to take the opportunity to get a lot of money from Don Gonzalo.
8	8	"Rosario descubrió que Antonio es el chico a quien besó"	8 November 2016	7 July 2017	1.02
Rosario begins to work with her mother. Rosario realizes that Leticia's brother is the boy she kissed at her school.
9	9	"Rosario se convirtió en la modelo sensación de una pasarela"	9 November 2016	10 July 2017	1.12
Gonzalo tells Delia that if she can get Rosario to his home, he will give her what she wants. The police arrest Cacho, but he manages to escape.
10	10	"Rosario fue golpeada y secuestrada por Cacho"	10 November 2016	11 July 2017	1.16
Yolanda helps Delia get ready to spend a romantic night with Gonzalo. Cacho and his men follow Rosario and beat her to kidnap her.
11	11	"Rosario no quiso confesarle a su madre que sufrió un terrible abuso"	11 November 2016	12 July 2017	1.22
Centella shoots one of Gonzalo's men and he kills her. The police are going to look for Emilio to his house by the death of Solange.
12	12	"Delia fue asesinada por El General"	14 November 2016	14 July 2017	1.17
Rosario is determined to take revenge on Cacho. Brandon and Fierro decide to move so that Gonzalo's men do not murder them.
13	13	"Rosario y Antonio se salvaron de ser secuestrados por El Gringo"	15 November 2016	17 July 2017	1.10
Rosario is about to kill Cacho, but Fierro and Brandon interrupt her. Emilio meets Rosario and Gringo almost kills them.
14	14	"Antonio volvió a besar a Rosario, pero en sueños"	16 November 2016	18 July 2017	1.14
Brandon tries to convince Rosario to tell him the truth about the men who beat her. Emilio decides to declare what he knows about Solange.
15	15	"Rosario atacó a la mamá de Antonio por acusar a Ruby de robo"	17 November 2016	19 July 2017	1.02
Marta accuses Ruby of stealing a very expensive necklace and Rosario attacks her with scissors. Rosario finds out that Cacho and his friends murdered Joselito.
16	16	"Rosario sedujo a Cacho y se vengó por haber abusado de ella"	18 November 2016	21 July 2017	0.98
Rosario is determined to take revenge on Cacho and seduces him to fulfill his plan. A policeman finds Delia's body in the trash.
17	17	"El Fierro le robó un beso a Rosario"	21 November 2016	24 July 2017	1.17
Emilio confesses to the police that he was Solange's lover. Gonzalo tells Enrique that he wants to give him the hacienda.
18	18	"Rosario y Antonio se volvieron a besar... pero en sueños"	22 November 2016	25 July 2017	1.29
Gonzalo sells Marta the hacienda and she is very happy. Emilio is released and his friends organize a party to celebrate with him.
19	19	"Cristóbal le dio una golpiza a la mamá de Rosario"	23 November 2016	27 July 2017	1.19
Emilio confesses to Antonio that he is in love with Paula. Yolanda goes to look for Rosario to the market to take it to Gonzalo's hacienda.
20	20	"Rosario asesinó sin piedad a El General"	24 November 2016	28 July 2017	1.31
A woman tells Antonio and Emilio that Rosario almost killed Cacho. Rosario kills Gonzalo.
21	21	"Rosario logró escapar de los hombres de Gonzalo tras asesinarlo"	25 November 2016	31 July 2017	0.41
Antonio tells Emilio that he does not want to continue looking for Rosario. Rosario kills the gringo and his men.
22	22	"Rosario y Emilio vivieron una noche de pasión"	28 November 2016	1 August 2017	0.39
Emilio meets Rosario and is struck by her beauty, she kisses him. Paula gets jealous when seeing the audacity of Rosario.
23	23	"Rosario recuperó el celular que olvidó en el departamento de Antonio"	29 November 2016	2 August 2017	0.41
Yolanda goes to Ruby's house to investigate about Rosario, but she tells him that she does not know where she is. Paula refuses to forgive Emilio for deceiving her and decides not to marry him.
24	24	"Rosario y sus amigos lograron robar la mercancía del camión"	30 November 2016	3 August 2017	0.39
Rosario disguises herself as a nun in order to circumvent a police checkpoint and make way for Brandon, Fierro and El Tigre.
25	25	"El güero puso aprueba la lealtad de Rosario"	1 December 2016	4 August 2017	0.39
Pamela interrogates the men who were attacked by Rosario and her people. Emilio and Antonio discover that Rosario was in his apartment.
26	26	"Rosario presenció cómo un coche atropelló a su hermano Erick"	2 December 2016	7 August 2017	0.36
Leticia gives birth and everyone celebrates. Antonio tells Marta they should not trust Susan. Erick is in an accident.
27	27	"Antonio tuvo intimidad con Sam pensando en Rosario"	5 December 2016	8 August 2017	0.42
Sam tells Leticia that she is in love with Antonio. Antonio arrives at his house and becomes nervous to realize that Rosario is there.
28	28	"Antonio fue secuestrado por Tobías"	6 December 2016	9 August 2017	0.37
Brandon defends Antonio so that Peludo does not kill him. Enrique and Susana discover that their trucks carry drugs.
29	29	"Rosario le pidió a Sam que no lastime a Antonio"	7 December 2016	10 August 2017	0.44
Federico sees Sam kissing Antonio. Rosario tells Sam that she does not want to hurt Antonio because she knows that she is married.
30	30	"Rosario no pudo cumplir con la misión de quitarle la vida al comandante"	8 December 2016	11 August 2017	0.42
Rosario has a bad feeling about Arteaga's work. Federico surprises Samantha by lying to him.
31	31	"Emilio defendió a Sam de los maltratos de Federico"	9 December 2016	14 August 2017	0.41
Pamela recognizes Rosario as the woman of the spoken portrait. Damian manages to leave prison while Yola tries to stay.
32	32	"Emilio y Antonio comenzaron a sospechar que Rosario es una delincuente"	12 December 2016	15 August 2017	0.45
Tobias joins Rosario's list of enemies. After the portrait of Rosario, Emilio and Antonio begin to doubt it.
33	33	"Federico contrató a El Fierro para asesinar a Antonio"	13 December 2016	16 August 2017	0.46
Leonardo begins to suspect that Rosario was involved in the death of the Military.
34	34	"Sam le robó un beso a Antonio"	14 December 2016	17 August 2017	0.41
Based on deceit, Damián kidnaps Luis Enrique's daughter in order to recover the hacienda.
35	35	"Antonio y Emilio se pelearon salvajemente por Rosario"	15 December 2016	18 August 2017	0.47
Rosario accomplishes what nobody believed possible, to break a friendship that seemed to prove everything.
36	36	"Antonio está muy cerca de ser asesinado por El Fierro"	16 December 2016	21 August 2017	0.49
Marta kicks out Enrique from her house. Rosario discovers that Federico asked Fierro to kill Antonio.
37	37	"Antonio vivió una noche de pasión con Rosario al confesarle su amor"	19 December 2016	24 August 2017	0.38
Damian finds out that Rosario murdered Gonzalo and wants to take revenge on her. The police informs Samantha that Federico was assassinated. Rosario is intimate with Antonio for the first time.
38	38	"Antonio le confesó a Emilio que está enamorado de Rosario"	20 December 2016	25 August 2017	0.46
Rosario informs Arteaga that Tobias is betraying him. Emilio suspects that Rosario and Antonio spent the night together.
39	39	"Rosario está muy cerca de ser asesinada por Cacho"	21 December 2016	28 August 2017	0.36
Patricia finds a drawing of Rosario in Antonio's room. Rosario meets Cacho and Damián.
40	40	"Brandon y El Fierro salvaron a Rosario de morir y asesinaron a Cacho"	22 December 2016	29 August 2017	0.37
Enrique and Susana learn that Damien was killed. Sam gets annoyed with Antonio for not telling the police that he knows Rosario.
41	41	"Antonio le juró a Sam que jamás podrá amarla como a Rosario"	3 January 2017	30 August 2017	0.38
Antonio warns Rosario that the police are following her footsteps.
42	42	"Paula descubrió que Emilio le es infiel con Rosario"	4 January 2017	31 August 2017	0.38
Samantha goes to the police to confirm that the portrait spoken is Rosario Tijeras.
43	43	"Rosario le reclamó a Emilio por ocultarle su boda con Paula"	5 January 2017	1 September 2017	0.44
Rosario demands Emilio to know what she means for him, because he is about to marry Paula.
44	44	"El Fierro recibió la orden de asesinar a Rosario"	6 January 2017	4 September 2017	0.45
Tobias orders Fierro to finish with Rosario if he wants to prove his loyalty.
45	45	"Rosario interrumpió la boda de Emilio y lo secuestró"	9 January 2017	5 September 2017	0.50
While Emilio and Paula are getting married, Rosario fires in the air and has kidnapped Emilio.
46	46	"Rosario descubrió que Emilio la abandonó para volver con su esposa"	10 January 2017	6 September 2017	0.42
Emilio decides to say goodbye to Rosario forever and return with Paula. Rosario wants to show you the evidence that Arteaga has.
47	47	"El Fierro hirió de muerte a Rosario"	11 January 2017	7 September 2017	0.49
Antonio and Samantha say goodbye forever. Fierro spends the night outside Rosario's apartment.
48	48	"Emilio le pidió a Rosario que luche por su vida"	12 January 2017	8 September 2017	0.40
Antonio discovers that Rosario is pregnant. El Peludo and Tobías celebrate the death of Rosario.
49	49	"El Fierro y Brandon salvaron a Rosario de ser asesinada en un hospital"	13 January 2017	11 September 2017	0.65
In the midst of a shooting, Brandon tries to get Rosario out of the hospital even though that does not guarantee that he will get out alive.
50	50	"Querubín descubrió el escondite de Rosario"	16 January 2017	12 September 2017	0.47
Fierro is getting closer to Rosario, the doctor listens when he apologizes for having shot her.
51	51	"Rosario le reprochó a Fierro con llanto su traición"	17 January 2017	13 September 2017	0.57
Antonio is informed that he will be sent to the prison while Emilio is released.
52	52	"El Fierro enfrentó a Tobías para vengar a Rosario"	18 January 2017	14 September 2017	0.60
It is revealed that it was Fierro who attempted against Rosario. Antonio is abandoned in prison by his own parents.
53	53	"Brandon arriesgó su vida por salvar a Rosario de una emboscada"	19 January 2017	15 September 2017	0.48
Rosario visits Antonio in jail, however she is discovered by people of Tobías who is entrusted to finish her.
54	54	"Rosario lloró desconsoladamente al descubrir que perdió a su bebé"	20 January 2017	18 September 2017	0.53
Paula listens to Emilio talk to Natalia about Rosario. Arteaga asks Rosario to kill Brandon.
55	55	"Rosario saca a Antonio de la cárcel"	23 January 2017	19 September 2017	0.47
Rosario will make a decision that will change her life and Antonio receives news that will make him think of escaping from prison.
56	56	"Brandon fue asesinado al salvar las vidas de su madre y hermano"	24 January 2017	20 September 2017	0.56
Police accuse Emilio of being behind Antonio's escape. Rosario confesses to Antonio that she had an abortion.
57	57	"Entre lágrimas Rosario le juró a Brandon vengar su muerte"	25 January 2017	21 September 2017	0.57
Rosario goes with Arteaga to warn him that Tobias had Brandon killed, in addition, Rosario promises to avenge Brandon.
58	58	"Peludo atacó a Rosario en el funeral de Brandon"	26 January 2017	22 September 2017	0.65
A shooting is unleashed at Brandon's funeral. Arteaga forbids Rosario to kill Tobias, Rosario warns that she will avenge the death of her brother.
59	59	"Rosario quemó toda la fortuna de Tobías"	27 January 2017	24 September 2017	0.68
In her eagerness to distance Emilio from Rosario and Antonio, Paula allies herself with Tobias.
60	60	"Rosario asesinó a Tobías para vengar las muertes de Emilio, Brandon y El Fierro"	30 January 2017	24 September 2017	0.68
Antonio appeals to Paula for telling Tobias where Rosario is. Tobias kills Emilio. Rosario kills Tobias in front of Arteaga.
