= Rosario Tijeras (Mexican TV series) season 5 =

Rosario Tijeras
- Season 5
- Starring: Bárbara de Regil; Sebastián Martínez; Francisco Angelini; Samantha Acuña
- No. of episodes: 40

Release
- Original network: Netflix
- Original release: 10 June – 20 June 2026

Season chronology
- ← Previous; Season 4

The fifth season of the Mexican television series Rosario Tijeras was announced on 10 September 2025. The first set of thirty-eight episodes was released on 10 June 2026, and the second set of two episodes was released on 20 June.

== Cast ==
=== Main ===
- Bárbara de Regil as María del Rosario López Ramos "Rosario Tijeras"
- Sebastián Martínez as Daniel Salgado "El Ángel"
- Francisco Angelini as Juan Antonio
- Samantha Acuña as Ruby
- Hernán Mendoza as León Elías Arteaga
- Paulette Hernández as Lucía
- Andrés Almeida as Sagrado
- Mauricio Isaac
- Luis Curiel as Pelao
- Alex Perea
- Gustavo Egelhaaf as Adrián
- Daniela Álvarez
- Daniella Valdez
- Vicky Araico as Mireya
- Joshua Okamoto as Chinche
- Stefany Sotres as Kim
- Vitter Leija as RAM
- Leticia Huijara
- Ramón Medina
- Jero Medina as Fredy
- Luis Vegas
- Octavio Hinojosa as Pável
- Francisco Calvillo as Telémaco
- John Goodrich
- Blake Webb as Ian
- Frida Jiser

=== Recurring ===
- Anette Michel as Victoria
- Andrés Borda as Sebastián Uriel

== Production ==
On 10 September 2025, Sony Pictures Television announced that a fifth season of Rosario Tijeras was in production. Filming wrapped in February 2026.

== Release ==
The season premiered on Netflix on 10 June 2026, with thirty-eight new episodes, followed by the final two episodes on 20 June 2026.
