= Rosario Tijeras (Mexican TV series) season 3 =

Rosario Tijeras
- Season 3
- No. of episodes: 70

Release
- Original network: Azteca 7
- Original release: 25 August – 14 December 2019

Season chronology
- ← Previous; Season 2 Next → Season 4

The third season of the Mexican television series Rosario Tijeras also known as Rosario Tijeras 3: Hasta el final was announced on 16 December 2018. The season premiered on 25 August 2019, and ended on 14 December 2019.

Production of the season began in January 2019 and ended in June 2019.

== Plot ==
Rosario's world collapses when her daughter, Ruby, is kidnapped. To recover her, she will have to accept to collaborate with the police, being part of an elite squad dedicated to the capture of El Ángel. Rosario must work against the clock and with the feelings to the surface, because in the neighborhood nothing is what it seems.

== Cast ==
- Bárbara de Regil as Rosario Tijeras
- Sebastián Martínez as Daniel Salgado "El Ángel"
- Juan Pablo Campa as Dylan
- Mauricio Islas as General Iriarte
- Samadhi Zendejas as Géminis
- Verónica Langer as Aurora
- Harold Azuara as Erik
- Pamela Almanza as Laura Peralta
- Marina Ruíz as Pamela
- Alejandro Guerrero as Capitán Bravo
- Marco León as Máicol
- Nikole Barajas as Rubí
- Guillermo Nava as Verdugo
- Renata Vaca as Julieth
- Roberto Duarte as Altamirano
- Jorge Lan as Agustín
- Christian Vega as Bernardo
- Claudette Maillé as Vanesa
- Roberto Montiel as Don Pacho
- Laura Ferretti as Marisol

=== Recurring and guests ===
- Hernán Mendoza as León Elías Arteaga
- Begoña Narváez as Martina
- Jordi Rush as Santiago
- Alex Galindo as Langosta

== Episodes ==
No. overall	No. in season	Title	Original release date	Mexico viewers (millions)
128	1	"El Ángel fracasa en su intento por rescatar a Rosario de la cárcel"	25 August 2019	1.9
129	2	"La hija de Rosario es secuestrada por una falsa enfermera"	25 August 2019	1.9
130	3	"La unidad de inteligencia le propone el indulto a Rosario Tijeras"	25 August 2019	1.9
Five years have passed after the sentence of Rosario Tijeras. Rosario has become a beautiful mom, just celebrating her daughter Ruby's fifth birthday. El Ángel wants and needs Rosario out of jail, in an attempt to force her out, Rosario confesses that Ruby is not his daughter. Rosario cannot rescue her daughter and is unconscious after receiving several blows. General Iriarte has a special mission, to capture El Ángel. General Iriarte gave the green light for Dylan to facilitate the escape of Rosario, they want her in the intelligence unit to capture El Ángel.
131	4	"Daniel Salgado "El Ángel", firma su matrimonio a cambio de muchos millones de dólares"	26 August 2019	1.9
Arteaga is betrayed by his own daughter, she confesses that she will marry Daniel Salgado "El Ángel". Erick ruins El Ángel's wedding, challenges him by opening his mouth.
132	5	"Rosario le confiesa a El Ángel que es el padre de su hija"	27 August 2019	2.0
Rosario does not follow Dylan's orders and escapes the operation to visit El Ángel, declares war, her daughter Ruby is in dispute.
133	6	"Rosario logra intercambiar el cargamento sin un solo disparo"	28 August 2019	1.8
Dylan complies with the first part of the plan, they already have the merchandise to compete with El Ángel. Rosario receives a letter from her daughter.
134	7	"Rosario se reencuentra con Erick"	29 August 2019	2.2
Rosario cries when she finds out that Erick is in bad steps, she begs him not follow the example of El Ángel. Pamela begins to distribute the merchandise, the Fantasma Cartel is born.
135	8	"El Ángel obtiene la ruta de la Gringa, rompió los códigos del negocio"	2 September 2019	1.8
El Ángel obtains the route to move his merchandise, Don Pacho accepted as long as his grandson does not die. The Fantasma cartel is present, the merchandise has already reached the hands of El Ángel.
136	9	"Dylan empieza a negociar con la Calaca, principal operador de El Ángel"	3 September 2019	1.8
The news confirms a new cartel in the city, the rumors reach El Ángel, he asks to investigate if Rosario Tijeras is behind everything.
137	10	"Rosario ejecuta al principal operador de El Ángel"	4 September 2019	1.8
Rosario and El Ángel meet again to calm down after the death of Calaca. El Ángel swears to Rosario that he did not kidnap her daughter. Aurora betrays El Ángel.
138	11	"Rosario y El Ángel pasan la noche juntos"	5 September 2019	1.6
Dylan begins to feel a special affection for Rosario. El Ángel finds out that Aurora has betrayed him. Rosario takes over Calaca's area, the neighborhood supports her.
139	12	"Operativo sorpresa contra Rosario"	9 September 2019	1.6
Rosario manages to escape the operation! Dylan forgives El Ángel's salesmen, he wants to control the area without violence. Rosario learns that Dylan lost his family in an attack.
140	13	"Pamela se infiltra como Escort"	10 September 2019	1.3
Pamela infiltrates as escort and gets an appointment with the main supplier of El Ángel. Dylan confesses to Rosario, gives her a detailed explanation of the attack his family suffered and asks her not to trust El Ángel.
141	14	"Dylan confirma que Vanesa tiene una relación cercana con Aurora"	11 September 2019	1.8
Rosario breaks relations with El Ángel after learning that Aurora has ties to the person who kidnapped her daughter. Dylan begins to negotiate with the partner of El Ángel, he asks for a 50 kilos shipment to start relations.
142	15	"Dylan logra defenderse de un ataque mortal de El Ángel"	12 September 2019	1.5
Dylan took advantage of an oversight of El Ángel to be safe from a direct attack. Rosario is captured, El Fósforo sold her to her enemies.
143	16	"Dylan recibe un disparo"	16 September 2019	1.7
Lieutenant Bravo disobeys General Iriarte and executes the operation to capture Santiago. Rosario and Dylan manage to escape.
144	17	"Dylan quiere recuperar su felicidad pero no con Rosario"	17 September 2019	1.6
Dylan wants to regain his happiness but not with Rosario, he can't mix feelings with work. El Ángel assures Rosario that Aurora is responsible for the kidnapping of her daughter, Rosario doesn't believe him.
145	18	"Erick le confirma a Rosario que Aurora traicionó a El Ángel, y es la responsable del secuestro de Ruby"	18 September 2019	1.7
Erick confirms to Rosario that Aurora betrayed El Ángel, and that she is responsible for Ruby's kidnapping. Dylan requires Rosario to hand over El Ángel, he points his gun at her.
146	19	"El Ángel rompe relaciones con Rosario"	19 September 2019	1.5
Rosario has no choice but to follow Dylan's side, the priority is to find her daughter and the track leads them with Don Pacho.
147	20	"Dylan logra obtener una entrevista con Don Pacho"	23 September 2019	1.4
Dylan manages to get an interview with Don Pacho. Dylan confirms that Aurora met with Don Pacho. Rosario is very close to finding Aurora's whereabouts. El Ángel gets information about the death of Fantasma's family
148	21	"Aurora vuelve a filtrar información"	24 September 2019	1.4
La Gringa is discovered by Lieutenant Bravo. El Ángel receives Lieutenant Bravo with a gas explosion. Bravo suspects that he has an infiltrate. General Iriarte's daughter continues to investigate Ruby's kidnapping.
149	22	"Rosario frente a frente con Aurora"	25 September 2019	1.6
Rosario is face to face with Aurora. Rosario goes to Don Pacho's house to find her daughter.
150	23	"Fuego cruzado, Rosario es capturada en casa de Don Pacho"	26 September 2019	1.6
Rosario and Don Pacho are captured by the police. El Ángel managed to escape because he was released by Rosario. Aurora received her punishment for betraying El Ángel.
151	24	"El operativo contra Don Pacho fue todo un éxito, va tras las rejas"	30 September 2019	1.6
Rosario escapes with Dylan's help. Dylan puts an ultimatum to Rosario, or they continue with the capture of Daniel Salgado, or her privileges are over. Laura is in the sights of the authorities, she is the main suspect in operating and laundering money for El Ángel.
152	25	"El Teniente Bravo catea la empresa y la casa de Laura Peralta"	1 October 2019	1.5
El Ángel erases all the clues that involve his relationship with Laura, hackers delete all the information. Dylan goes for the only clue about Ruby's kidnapping.
153	26	"El Ángel le da una lección a Erick por robarle dinero de la venta de su mercancía"	2 October 2019	N/A
El Ángel gives Erick a lesson for stealing money from the sale of his merchandise. Lieutenant Bravo found no evidence at Laura Peralta's house.
154	27	"El Ángel confirma que Dylan es un infiltrado de la policía"	3 October 2019	1.4
El Ángel confirms that Dylan is a police infiltrate. El Ángel humiliates Verdugo for overcoming Erick and his friends, he makes him apologize house by house. Aurora ends the life of Don Pacho, she poisons him. El Ángel threatens Lieutenant Bravo’s father.
155	28	"Dylan finge su muerte con ayuda de Rosario"	7 October 2019	1.4
Dylan fakes his death with Rosario's help. Aurora tries to negotiate with El Ángel without having a result and declare war against each other.
156	29	"Rosario se entrega a Dylan"	8 October 2019	1.5
Dylan and Rosario spend the night together, their priority is to find Ruby and rebuild their lives. Laura searches for Arteaga's contacts to move her merchandise. Pulido denounces Dylan with General Iriarte.
157	30	"Laura Peralta consigue la ruta para transportar la mercancía de Daniel Salgado"	9 October 2019	1.4
Laura got the route that Arteaga used to move his merchandise. Dylan and Rosario relax on the beach. El Ángel confirmed that the death of Fantasma is a show.
158	31	"El General Iriarte está detrás del secuestro de Ruby"	10 October 2019	1.5
El Ángel suspects that the authorities are behind Ruby's kidnapping. Rosario and Dylan go on the last track to find his whereabouts. General Iriarte prevents himself and informs Vanesa.
159	32	"Rosario logró conseguir información sobre el paradero de Ruby"	14 October 2019	1.5
Rosario managed to get information about Ruby's whereabouts. Laura sends her first shipment with her new business partner, things get out of control because of Erick.
160	33	"Rosario entra en razón y sospecha que la policía está detrás del secuestro de su hija"	15 October 2019	1.4
Rosario enters reason and suspects that the police are behind the kidnapping of her daughter and submits Dylan, she gives Agent Pamela 24 hours to deliver her daughter. Dylan is in danger.
161	34	"La Agente Pamela llega al rescate de Dylan"	16 October 2019	1.4
Pamela comes to the rescue of Dylan. Rosario manages to escape and seeks comfort with her dad. Toxina is back and is going after Rosario.
162	35	"Toxina está de regreso"	17 October 2019	1.3
General Iriarte releases Toxina from jail to capture Rosario. Dylan finds a clue that makes him suspect of General Iriarte. Rosario joins El Ángel to find Ruby.
163	36	"Géminis ejecuta al papá de Rosario"	21 October 2019	1.5
Géminis executes Rosario's dad. Dylan asks General Iriarte to reinstate him to capture Rosario. Laura and Erick are in danger from a surprise operation at the auction house.
164	37	"Laura y Erick logran escapar del operativo sorpresa del Teniente Bravo"	22 October 2019	1.3
Laura and Erick manage to escape Lieutenant Bravo's surprise operation. Aurora was behind everything. Dylan continues to investigate General Iriarte, requests DNA tests in the cigar he found.
165	38	"El Ángel confirma que Aurora fue la responsable del operativo que implementó el Teniente Bravo"	23 October 2019	1.5
El Ángel confirms that Aurora was responsible for the operation that Lieutenant Bravo implemented. El Ángel proposes to Rosario to avenge Antonio's death. General Iriarte assigns double budget to Lieutenant Bravo for the capture of Rosario, congratulates him on the great blow to the Pegaso cartel.
166	39	"Rosario venga la muerte de Antonio"	24 October 2019	1.5
After a long time, Rosario comes the death of her great love, Antonio. Don Pacho agrees to the death of Aurora in exchange for being rescued from the hospital. Erick is face to face with Toxina.
167	40	"Toxina frente a frente con Rosario"	28 October 2019	1.2
Rosario is captured by Toxina and Géminis. Dylan confirms Rubí's whereabouts and awaits orders to rescue her. El Ángel suffers from Aurora’s death.
168	41	"El Ángel llega al rescate de Chayo"	29 October 2019	1.5
Rosario buries her father and says goodbye to him. Although they are in a violent confrontation, El Ángel and Rosario collect Horacio's body and escape from Toxina and Géminis.
169	42	"Rubí, Rosario y El Ángel por fin se reúnen"	30 October 2019	N/A
After Dylan and Géminis finish with Vanessa, Vulture leaves Rubí free and she reunites with her parents. While trying to save Pablo, Maicol and Erick are involved in a shooting.
170	43	"Para salvar a su hija y a Rosario, El Ángel toma una dirección contraria a ellas y se pone a merced de la policía"	31 October 2019	1.5
Rosario, Rubí and El Ángel spend the night in the forest surrounded by police, however, they have to separate so that they don’t get caught. Erick leads the operation to free Don Pacho, which causes Bernardo and his father, Altamirano, to face each other.
171	44	"El Ángel se entrega a la justicia"	4 November 2019	1.5
Dylan catches El Ángel and, although they already had her in his possession, for letting her say goodbye to her daughter, Bravo loses custody of Rosario and she manages to escape with Rubí.
172	45	"Mientras El Ángel está tras las rejas, Rosario y Erick comienzan a planear cómo rescatarlo además de planear cómo poner a salvo a Rubí"	5 November 2019	1.5
Rubí believes that her mother is "one of the bad guys", so she is sad and Erick asks Rosario to tell him the whole truth. El Ángel is imprisoned and Dylan enjoys the moment, but Géminis is following his footsteps.
173	46	"Verdugo llega a la cárcel para seguir defendiendo a "El Ángel" y encuentran una ruta de escape"	6 November 2019	1.4
Erick disguises himself as a funeral coach to free Don Pacho, while Verdugo and El Ángel manage to get him out of jail.
174	47	"Rosario busca a Dylan para despedirse"	7 November 2019	1.6
Rosario is willing to flee the country and leave everything behind, however, Erick knows that this is not the life she wants. El Ángel gives an interview to Martina and pleads guilty to everything.
175	48	"Rosario estaba a punto de salir del país, pero regresa después de que Laura le pide apoyo para El Ángel"	11 November 2019	1.4
Rosario takes Don Pacho's merchandise to the beach and at the same time she plans to leave the country, however, Laura searches for her and tells her that El Ángel needs her help, so she leaves everything to him.
176	49	"Rosario y Laura trabajan de la mano para armar el plan para salvar a El Ángel"	12 November 2019	1.6
Rosario sleeps with Dylan in order to obtain the necessary information about the extradition of El Ángel, while Laura does the same with Jeremy so that she remains the lawyer of her beloved.
177	50	"La policía le quita a El Ángel el celular que tenía escondido"	13 November 2019	1.5
After an oversight of Erick, the pilot flees and after understanding his plan, Dylan takes El Ángel’s cell phone, while Pamela abandons the mission of saving her relationship with Agustín.
178	51	"¡Intento fallido! Dylan arruinó el intento de rescate de El Ángel y Rosario fue capturada"	14 November 2019	1.7
Pamela returns with Agustín. Rosario is almost captured by Bravo and Laura is kidnapped by Toxina and Géminis.
179	52	"Rosario logra escapar de Dylan, pero El Ángel es encerrado en la celda más severa del penal"	18 November 2019	1.6
Although Dylan had Rosario handcuffed, Erick manages to save her, but it doesn't go the same for El Ángel. Laura gives Martina an interview and she finds out that Gregory is Daniel Salgado's lawyer.
180	53	"Rosario regresa a la cárcel"	19 November 2019	1.4
Rosario will not be giving up and in order to save El Ángel, she enters jail to work as a team with Mía. Géminis visits July in Cañada Negra and Rubí recognizes her.
181	54	"La DEA llegó por El Ángel pero Rosario está cada vez más cerca de poder salvar a El Ángel"	20 November 2019	1.6
Mía and Rosario manage to open a hole in the women's bathroom to escape with El Ángel, while he has a meeting with Gregory and records a message for Rubí.
182	55	"Rosario salva a El Ángel"	21 November 2019	1.7
Although Pamela and Dylan were about to get their way, Rosario, Poncho, Mía, Verdugo and El Ángel manage to get out of jail through the sewers.
183	56	"Escapar no será fácil"	25 November 2019	1.6
Bravo, Iriarte, Pamela, Géminis and Toxina are waiting for Rosario and El Ángel to leave prison, everyone wants to kill Rosario.
184	57	"Rosario y El Ángel logran escapar de la cárcel"	26 November 2019	1.7
Rosario and El Ángel manage to escape despite the fact that Iriarte and his agents, and Toxina and Géminis are after them. Verdugo gives his life for his boss and is killed in the middle of a shooting.
185	58	"El Ángel quiere rehacer su vida con Rosario pero ella sólo quiere aceptar si se aleja de la delincuencia"	27 November 2019	0.95
El Ángel tells Laura that his life will be with Rosario, but Rosario does not want to continue with him unless he leaves the cartel and rebuild his life from scratch.
186	59	"Rosario escapa de nuevo"	28 November 2019	1.6
Laura will not rest until she finishes with Rosario, so she lies to Rosario and makes her believe that El Ángel is still working, so Rosario decides to go with Rubí and rebuild her life in the United States.
187	60	"Toxina captura a Rosario y es entregada al General Iriarte"	2 December 2019	1.6
Toxina fulfills the mission of capturing Rosario Tijeras. General Iriarte is responsible for finishing with Rosario and throws her over a cliff.
188	61	"Dylan sabotea la conferencia del General Iriarte"	3 December 2019	1.6
Dylan enters General Iriarte’s press conference, manages to show the confession of Vanessa's boyfriend that commits him directly to the kidnapping of Rosario's daughter.
189	62	"Iriarte le confiesa a Martina que es el responsable del secuestro de la hija de Rosario Tijeras"	4 December 2019	1.7
Martina discovers that her father is the monster behind the case of Rosario Tijeras, she feels disappointed. Iriarte is one step away from going to jail.
190	63	"El General Iriarte es declarado culpable y sentenciado a 92 años de prisión"	5 December 2019	2.0
Dylan will not rest until he sees Rosario Tijeras behind bars. Iriarte is rescued by a command under Laura Peralta, together they declare war on Rosario.
191	64	"El Ángel y Rosario unen fuerza para acabar con el General Iriarte"	8 December 2019	1.2
Dylan agrees to work with Rosario in exchange for the breakup of Laura Peralta ‘scartel. Rosario and El Ángel want to end Iriarte.
192	65	"La sangre se paga con sangre"	9 December 2019	1.1
Dylan swears on his family to catch Rosario Tijeras. Laura and Iriarte counterattack Rosario, they want her dead. Rosario and Erick kill Toxina.
193	66	"Rosario asume todos los riesgos y va al rescate de Daniel Salgado"	10 December 2019	1.8
Rosario is face to face with Laura Peralta. Rosario's love for El Ángel is so great to risk her life and free him.
194	67	"Rosario y El Ángel van por Laura Peralta"	11 December 2019	1.5
Rosario and El Ángel go after Laura Peralta, the operation gets out of control and they are captured.
195	68	"El Ángel se convierte en el mismo diablo"	12 December 2019	1.9
El Ángel mercilessly executes Laura Peralta and Maicol, Erick's best friend.
196	69	"El Ángel secuestra a la hija de Iriarte para negociar la libertad de su hija Rubí"	14 December 2019	2.3
197	70	"Rosario sacrifica su vida"	14 December 2019	2.3
El Ángel kidnaps Iriarte's daughter to negotiate the freedom of his daughter Rubí. Iriarte gives in to the threat of El Ángel. Julieth reports the murder of her mother, Lieutenant Bravo assures her that he will do justice. The attorney general organizes an operation to capture Géminis, responsible for Marisol's death. Rosario rescues her daughter. Rosario loses her brother Erick and El Ángel. Rosario manages to end Iriarte, but he left a bomb in a Virgin of Guadalupe statue, Rosario sacrifices herself to save the town and dies.
