= Rosario Tijeras (Mexican TV series) season 2 =

Rosario Tijeras
- Season 2
- Starring: Bárbara de Regil; José María de Tavira; Sebastián Martínez; Hernán Mendoza
- No. of episodes: 67

Release
- Original network: Azteca 7
- Original release: 27 August – 16 December 2018

Season chronology
- ← Previous; Season 1 Next → Season 3

The second season of the Mexican television series Rosario Tijeras, created by Adriana Pelusi and Carlos Quintanilla. The season premiered on 27 August 2018 and concluded on 16 December 2018. This season aired on Azteca 7, unlike the previous season which aired on Azteca 13. The season was announced in January 2017. Production of the season began in October 2017. 60 episodes have been confirmed for the season. In the United States the season premiered on UniMás on 7 January 2019.

Bárbara de Regil and José María de Tavira returned from the previous season. New actors joining the series include Christian Chávez and Sebastián Martínez.

== Plot ==
After escaping death, Rosario and Antonio manage to outwit their enemies to ensure their freedom, but are forced to separate while fleeing. Rosario falls into the grasp of El Ángel, a mysterious man who is both seductive and violent, and hides a very dark secret. Rosario will find herself in the middle of a bloody revenge between two crime bosses, and she will have to do everything possible to save her little brother and recover Antonio, the love of her life.

== Cast ==
- Bárbara de Regil as Rosario Tijeras
- José María de Tavira as Antonio Bethancourt
- Sebastián Martínez as Daniel Salgado "El Ángel"
- Hernán Mendoza as León Elías Arteaga
- Danny Perea as Pamela Pulido
- Verónica Langer as Aurora
- Harold Azuara as Erik
- Christian Chávez as Guarro
- Claudio Lafarga as Gabriel
- Sonia Couoh as Melva
- Mario Loría as Jonás
- Gabriel Casanova as Isaac Medina
- Lucía Silva as Paula Restrepo
- Israel Islas as Toxina
- Leonardo Alonso as Génaro
- Ignacio Riva Palacio as Andrómeda
- Palmeira Cruz as Venus
- Tatiana Martínez as Serena
- Lizzy Auna as Alexandra
- Marina Victoria as Tania
- Alan Castillo as John
- Fernando Ciangherotti as Pegaso
- Yolanda Ventura as Andrea

=== Recurring and guest ===
- Constantino Morán as Querubín
- Juan José Pucheta as Manuel Osorno
- Pamela Almanza as Laura Peralta

== Episodes ==
No. overall	No. in season	Title	Mexico air date	U.S. air date	Mexico viewers (millions)	U.S. viewers (millions)
61	1	"Rosario y Antonio logran escapar de Arteaga"	27 August 2018	7 January 2019	2.7	0.33
Rosario and Antonio manage to escape from the ranch with the help of Querubín and his cousin Jonás. Rosario and Antonio are about to take a plane that will take them to the border but a heavily armed police team manages to intercept them. Arteaga's men kidnap Antonio and torture him to find out where Rosario is. Arteaga goes with everything to avenge the death of his brother Tobías.
62	2	"Rosario se encuentra raptada"	28 August 2018	8 January 2019	2.5	0.26
Rosario is safe but the people of El Angel have her under surveillance. Paula attends Emilio's funeral and blames herself for his death. Leo and Antonio are still deprived of their freedom on the orders of Arteaga. Jonás will pressure Leo so that through Rubí, Rosario will face Arteaga.
63	3	"A tijerazos, Rosario lo vuelve hacer"	29 August 2018	9 January 2019	2.3	0.32
Rosario tries to escape, but she runs into one of her kidnappers and stabs him with scissors to defend a nurse from being abused. Jonás goes to find Rosario at Rubí's house and leaves a package for her.
64	4	"Rosario se escapa de la hacienda"	30 August 2018	10 January 2019	2.4	0.24
The nurse who takes care of Rosario decides to help her escape in gratitude for defending her from the man who wanted to abuse her. El Ángel goes after her to capture her. Paula sees a video of Antonio saying that he was kidnapped by Arteaga and is determined to help him.
65	5	"Rosario y El Ángel frente a frente"	3 September 2018	11 January 2019	2.0	0.30
After a confrontation, El Ángel submits Rosario and asks her to fight together against Arteaga. Paula proposes to Marta and Luis Enrique to offer a reward for the kidnappers to free Antonio.
66	6	"Arteaga le declara la guerra a Rosario"	4 September 2018	14 January 2019	2.3	0.27
Rosario manages to see the message that Arteaga left at home and says that blood is paid with blood. Rosario is in danger. Toxina has no limits, now tortures Antonio with electric shocks. Jonás kidnaps Erik and Ruby on El Angel's orders and takes them to a hotel.
67	7	"Rosario va en busca de Antonio"	5 September 2018	15 January 2019	2.3	0.29
Arteaga prepares an operation to capture Rosario. Jonás updates El Ángel but he denies the help. Rosario finds an ally in Tania and they equip themselves to rescue Antonio. Paula gives a lot of money to Antonio's kidnappers thinking that they will release him.
68	8	"Tania defiende a Rosario"	6 September 2018	16 January 2019	2.5	0.40
With a plan that went perfectly, Rosario rescues Antonio with the help of Tania, her new ally. Arteaga's men chase Rosario and shoot her.
69	9	"Toxina lesiona a Rosario"	10 September 2018	17 January 2019	2.0	0.35
Rosario receives a shot from Toxina and falls to the precipice, however, she manages to save her life by falling into a dump truck. Peste manages to bite Antonio and leaves him badly hurt. Antonio manages to escape but he is very weak. Arteaga learns that Rosario escaped and gives Toxina permission to search for Erik and Rubí. Paula decides to go back to working as a model.
70	10	"Toxina acaba con la vida de Ruby"	11 September 2018	18 January 2019	1.7	0.35
Toxina discovers Ruby's hotel and does not hesitate to murder her. Erik manages to escape with Jonás' help. Rosario is in crisis due to the death of her mother. Antonio is unconscious on the street and the police rescue him. With an injection of adrenaline, he comes back to life. Isaac discovers that Pamela's computer was altered.
71	11	"Rosario pacta con El Ángel"	12 September 2018	21 January 2019	1.9	0.31
Rosario tries to comfort Erik but resists the death of his mother. Jonás offers Rosario full support. Rosario can not rescue Ruby from the coroner and Toxina is after her, she asks El Ángel for help. Isaac discovers the cement factory where they had Antonio. A nurse discovers Antonio's identity. Arteaga, furious with Toxina, orders him to return to the city.
72	12	"Arteaga no perdona"	13 September 2018	22 January 2019	2.0	0.32
Toxina betrays Gerry and makes Arteaga believe that it was he who killed Ruby. Arteaga does not spare Gerry's life. El Ángel helps Rosario with the burial of Ruby. Isaac believes that the infiltrator was Garcia, Guarro breathes relief. Rosario and Erik go to San Miguel. Paula arrives at the hospital to rescue Antonio.
73	13	"Antonio logra escapar de Toxina"	17 September 2018	23 January 2019	1.9	0.39
Toxina bursts into the hospital where Antonio is, Antonio manages to escape with Paula's help. Rosario gives the last goodbye to Ruby. Isaac and Pamela arrive at the place in search of Rosario. She and Erik escape, and Tania, is captured. Isaac and Pamela talk about what they feel. Paula takes Antonio to San Cristóbal to meet Rosario.
74	14	"Rosario ya está en casa de El Ángel"	18 September 2018	24 January 2019	1.9	0.32
Rosario accepts the help of El Ángel and finally agree to counterattack Arteaga. Antonio and Paula relive old passions. Rosario promises Erik to avenge Rubí. Pamela follows Tania. Genaro realizes that Melva has been lying to him and he hits her. Rosario defends her. Melva confesses that she put the child to school. Toxina discovers that Paula helped Antonio escape from the hospital. Rosario and Erik move to El Ángel's house.
75	15	"Paula está en graves problemas"	19 September 2018	25 January 2019	1.8	0.36
Toxina waits for Paula at home and beats her to give him information about Antonio. The police break in, Toxina and Ardilla escape. Ángel gives a motorbike, credit cards and a revolver to Rosario to start her mission against Arteaga. Melva suffers when she realizes that her husband does not love her son and will not let him continue studying.
76	16	"Rosario le perdona la vida a Luis Enrique"	20 September 2018	28 January 2019	1.9	0.27
Rosario did not know that her next victim was Luis Enrique, she forgives his life. Aurora busca una doble para Rosario. Guarro follows Paula. Isaac, Pamela and several agents pursue Rosario. Antonio decides to meet with his parents when he learns that Luis Enrique's life is in danger.
77	17	"Antonio se reencuentra con sus papás"	24 September 2018	29 January 2019	1.8	0.30
After so much suffering, Antonio manages to reunite with his parents. Antonio can not believe that Rosario tried to assassinate Luis Enrique. Tania and Rosario carry out a plan for the police to arrest the Bólido. Paula hides Antonio. El Ángel puts Rosario to the test and fails to pass the test of etiquette.
78	18	"Rosario y El Ángel se besan apasionadamente"	25 September 2018	30 January 2019	2.0	0.32
El Ángel seduces Rosario and achieves his goal. El Bólido confesses who paid him to kill Luis Enrique. Paula tells in an interview that Antonio is alive.
79	19	"Rosario no se deja seducir"	26 September 2018	31 January 2019	2.0	0.34
Rosario puts a stop to El Ángel, does not want to continue with his seduction game and asks him to respect her space. Rosario is going to live at Genaro's house. Rosario feels remorse for betraying Antonio. Comino makes contact with Alexandra. The police listen to the conversation between Perla and Arteaga. Antonio deactivates the GPS and goes in Paula's car.
80	20	"Antonio y Paula lo vuelven hacer"	27 September 2018	1 February 2019	1.1	0.32
Antonio falls back into Paula's arms, apparently a passionate relationship is being born. El Ángel tries to give swimming lessons to Rosario, but she refuses to learn because she is afraid. Aquiles kills the guest during the game of Russian roulette and Jonas covers it before Arteaga. Guarro believes he located Antonio.
81	21	"Paula enfrenta a Rosario y le dice que no vale la pena que busque a Antonio"	1 October 2018	4 February 2019	2.0	0.34
Rosario goes to look for Paula at her job to get information from Antonio, but she refuses to give her his whereabouts. Comino kidnaps Alexandra. Don Blas takes evicts the girls from the pension. Isaac and Pamela blackmail Ardilla. Rosario arrives at the hotel in Miami and receives instructions from Ángel.
82	22	"Rosario tiene su primera misión y las cosas no están saliendo bien"	2 October 2018	5 February 2019	1.9	0.35
Rosario and El Ángel work hand in hand to counterattack Arteaga. Their mission is to supplant Andrews, Arteaga's new partner. Paula and her representative help Antonio change his image so the police will not find him. Rosario sees El Ángel with another woman in the wine tasting and becomes jealous. Andrómeda and Venus get money working together and return to the room of the pension. Alexandra is still kidnapped. Antonio shows up at Tania's house looking for Rosario.
83	23	"Rosario pone en marcha el plan contra Andrews y logra sacar información de su ordenador"	3 October 2018	6 February 2019	1.9	0.34
Rosario and El Ángel discover that Mr. Andrews is a pedophile. Rosario devises a plan to kill Mr. Andrews and make him pay for all his crimes. Tania promises Antonio to give him news about Rosario. Andrómeda and Venus work in a bar where they seduce Ardilla and Moncada. Rosario confesses to El Ángel the immense love she feels for Antonio.
84	24	"Rosario se mete a la boca del lobo"	4 October 2018	7 February 2019	1.7	0.35
Rosario kills Andrews. Rosario and El Ángel meet with Aquiles to close the final deal but Rosario breaks the rules and is in danger. Jonás entrusts the load to Ardilla. He informs the meeting place of Aquiles and Rosario to the police, who is preparing the operation. El Guarro manages to delay the start time of it.
85	25	"Rosario ejecuta a Aquiles con una llave mortal"	8 October 2018	8 February 2019	2.0	0.35
Rosario kills Aquiles and goes in search of El Ángel's money. Toxina discovers her. Both must confront the police. Jonás tries to help her. Pulido infuriates because Toxina escaped.
86	26	"Rosario logra saltar de la avioneta con ayuda de Jonás"	9 October 2018	11 February 2019	2.0	0.30
Rosario manages to escape from Toxina by throwing herself off the plane they were traveling on. Arteaga asks for Rosario's body to confirm her death, but she is alive. El Ángel rescues Rosario and puts her safe. Alexandra gets a tattoo very similar to Rosario's to make her look like her. Serena and Andrómeda steal from Jésica.
87	27	"Rosario se dejó besar por El Ángel"	10 October 2018	12 February 2019	1.8	0.30
El Ángel tries to make Rosario lose her fear of water and takes advantage of the confinement to continue seducing her. Rosario makes it clear that she is in love with Antonio. Arteaga knows that someone has betrayed him. Paula and Antonio plan to go to the lake where Rosario was seen. Andrómeda and Venus denounce the disappearance of Alexandra and take Serena out of jail. Erik suffers an accident and decides not to tell anyone, but Melva discovers him.
88	28	"Rosario y Antonio vuelven a estar juntos"	11 October 2018	13 February 2019	2.1	0.32
With the help of El Ángel, Antonio manages to reunite with Rosario. Isaac and Pamela plan an operation to trap Arteaga. Rosario and Antonio make love and she confesses to him that she will avenge her mother's death and asks him to stay with her, but he refuses. Comino hands Alexandra to Aurora.
89	29	"Rosario y El Ángel pasan la noche juntos"	15 October 2018	14 February 2019	1.7	0.33
Rosario and El Ángel spend the night in an inn. Aurora confirms that Alexandra was murdered. Arteaga doubts his men in jail. Antonio is determined to turn himself in to the police, Alonso and Paula try to convince him not to do it, but he thinks it is the best option.
90	30	"El plan de El Ángel rindió sus primeros frutos, la agente Pulido cree que Rosario está muerta"	16 October 2018	15 February 2019	1.7	0.32
Alexandra's body was found in a state of decomposition, near where the operation against Arteaga took place. The agents are believing that Rosario is dead. Genaro insists on having a child with Melva. Antonio enters the prison. Guarro accompanies him and takes the opportunity to take a copy of the keys to the cell. Andrómeda, Serena and Venus go in search of Alexandra's mother. Rosario tells Erik that Antonio does not want to be with her and he advises her to be El Ángel's girlfriend.
91	31	"Antonio firma su sentencia de muerte"	17 October 2018	18 February 2019	1.8	0.27
Antonio makes a new friend in prison, Pepe, who teaches him how to survive the place. El Tuerto assassinates the prisoners who are witnesses of the operation of the Laguna. Pamela and Isaac argue over the possible death of Rosario. Aurora blackmails a doctor to falsify DNA tests on a woman's body. Bolido learns that Antonio knows Rosario and is determined to take revenge on her.
92	32	"Arteaga llora la falsa muerte de Rosario Tijeras, pide que le hagan un funeral a su altura"	18 October 2018	19 February 2019	1.7	0.31
Rosario's death is announced through the media. Rosario gets mad at Ángel for killing an innocent woman to make everyone believe that she was her. Antonio asks for protection in prison, but it is denied. Andrómeda, Serena and Venus arrive at Espíritu Santo. Paula tells Antonio that Rosario died.
93	33	"Rosario le confiesa a El Ángel que perdió un bebé"	22 October 2018	20 February 2019	1.6	0.30
El Ángel and Rosario are on a mission where Rosario pretends to be pregnant, Rosario does not feel well because it brings back bad memories. Toxina detects that Ardilla is the infiltrate. Tania becomes very ill to learn about Rosario's death and goes to her funeral to say goodbye to her. Paula gives the director of the jail a lot of money to visit Antonio and ensure his protection.
94	34	"Ardilla es descubierto por Toxina y Arteaga no le perdona la vida"	23 October 2018	21 February 2019	1.6	0.30
El Guarro warned Toxina that Ardilla was the possible infiltrator. Toxina corroborated him taking some photos in full meeting with Agent Medina. Rosario has nightmares in which Horacio and Alexandra appear. Andrómeda, Venus and Serena promote their show throughout the town. Paula visits Antonio and they have sex. Arteaga kills Ardilla. Erik escapes to the club to see Venus' show and Aurora finds him, he asks her not to tell Rosario and El Ángel.
95	35	"Las pesadillas de Rosario dan con su papá"	24 October 2018	22 February 2019	1.7	0.33
Rosario finds out that she is Horacio's daughter. She visits Alexandra's tomb and Pamela sees her. El Ángel discovers Arteaga's laboratory. Paula talks about her plans with Bólido. Serena learns that Alexandra's raptor is Comino.
96	36	"Rosario se arrepiente de explotar la bomba en el laboratorio de Arteaga"	25 October 2018	25 February 2019	1.7	0.28
El Ángel's plan broke down by Rosario's decision. The mission continues with an alternate and stealth attack. Rosario and Angel scare Úrsula. Serena, Andrómeda and Venus find, in Comino's home, Alexandra's clothes. They also discover that Aurora has something to do with her disappearance. Bólido gives Pamela information to blackmail the Senator. Antonio has a plan to escape and adds Bólido.
97	37	"Arteaga da un duro golpe a El Ángel"	29 October 2018	26 February 2019	1.6	0.33
Guarro got the batch number of the bottle he has in his receipt and found the location of the warehouse. Arteaga sent an operative in search of El Ángel. Toxina kills the workers at Gabriel's wine factory. Jonás saves Gabriel. Paula shows Perla, the Senator, the evidence she has that she is a murderer and blackmails her to get Antonio out of prison. Bólido and Antonio execute a plan to generate riots. Rosario sees a picture of Antonio kissing Paula in a magazine.
98	38	"Genaro casi pierde la vida por culpa de Erick"	30 October 2018	27 February 2019	1.8	0.29
Aurora found the missing bottles in Genaro's house and was about to execute him but, Érik confessed that he stole the bottles. Érik will be punished by Aurora. Úrsula falls into Rosario's trap. Isaac, Pamela and Guarro arrive at Gabriel's office and discover a massacre involving an old cartel. Melva tells Genaro that she does not want to have a child of his and kicks him out of the house. One of the girls in the market discovers that Rosario is doing witchcraft to Úrsula.
99	39	"Rosario ejecuta a Doña Úrsula y termina con la primera parte de la misión"	31 October 2018	28 February 2019	N/A	0.27
Rosario takes Úrsula to the cemetery and kills her. Aurora asks Érik to take the bomb, without telling him what it is about. Érik asks John to take it. He puts the explosive, but can not escape. Antonio starts his plan.
100	40	"Rosario y El Ángel rescatan al hijo de Melba tras la explosión del laboratorio de Arteaga"	1 November 2018	1 March 2019	1.5	0.33
Rosario saves John from being burned in Arteaga's laboratory. Erik flirts with Venus. El Ángel gets upset with Aurora for the collateral damage she caused and takes her to work in Don Delfino's canteen. Arteaga asks Jonás to investigate Pegaso. Jonás kills Peste.
101	41	"El agente Medina sigue la investigación sobre una presunta hija que tiene Arteaga"	5 November 2018	4 March 2019	1.6	0.29
The research on Arteaga changes course by identifying a relationship he had with a model and that apparently was the love of his life. Everything indicates that Arteaga had a daughter with her. Pamela and Isaac discover that the laboratory that exploded in the market belongs to Arteaga. Bolido kills El Tuerto to save Antonio. Antonio receives the notification of his order of freedom and Bólido tells him that it was thanks to Paula. Pamela interrogates Claudia in the market. Rosario helps Melva open her own beauty salon.
102	42	"Antonio sale de la cárcel"	6 November 2018	5 March 2019	1.7	0.31
Antonio is very angry about the way he got out of prison. Paula is in danger of failing to comply with the deal with Bólido. El Ángel and the men of the town dance half-naked in the central plaza. Rosario finds out that Antonio was released and that he has a relationship with Paula. Aurora and Erik go to find Tania and convince her to work with the Angel. Isaac visits Andrea Peralta at the hospital. Rosario and Tania reunite.
103	43	"Tania se hará pasar como hija de Arteaga para vengar la muerte de Rubí"	7 November 2018	6 March 2019	1.8	0.32
Arteaga is surprised after Tania's call, Jonás is charged with investigating everything about his supposed daughter. Antonio and Paula prepare a plan to get Bólido out of jail. The women of the town attend the party at El Ángel's hacienda. El Ángel publicly declares his love for Rosario. Andrómeda sneaks into Aurora's room.
104	44	"Andrómeda fracasó en su intento por encontrar alguna pista de su amiga"	8 November 2018	7 March 2019	1.6	0.30
Andrómeda and her friends are still looking for any clue to find Alexandra's whereabouts. In the attempt, Aurora discovers Andrómeda in her room and Ángel humiliates her. Tania begins her transformation as Laura. Bólido attends Paula's event and she and Antonio plan to help him escape. Andrómeda tells her friends that she thinks Alexandra is dead and they will never find her.
105	45	"Rosario le negó un beso a Antonio, su corazón ya está con el Ángel"	12 November 2018	8 March 2019	1.5	0.33
Rosario and El Ángel return to the city to plan the next mission against Arteaga. El Ángel is furious when he learns that Pamela is watching Tania, so he decides to cancel the operation, but Rosario convinces him to give it a try. Tania is going to sue Pamela for harassment to the Attorney's Office where she talks to Isaac. Rosario takes advantage of the trip to visit Antonio, Paula surprised them in the middle of the meeting. Isaac follows Jonás and witnesses his meeting with Ángel.
106	46	"Paula sorprende a Rosario y Antonio en su departamento"	13 November 2018	11 March 2019	1.6	0.34
After drinking alcohol in a romantic dinner, Antonio confused Paula with Rosario. Paula tells Bólido that Rosario is alive and in Tania's house, to finally get rid of her. Bólido is already on the lookout for Rosario and is just waiting for the moment to execute her. Isaac forces Pamela to see a psychiatrist. Rosario speaks with Horacio. Tania kisses Rosario and confesses that she is in love with her.
107	47	"Arteaga y El Ángel frente a frente"	14 November 2018	12 March 2019	1.8	0.33
Bólido enters Tania's house to kill Rosario, but they set a trap and manage to trap him. Rosario, Tania and El Ángel carry out their plan to assassinate Arteaga, but things do not go as they expected. Tania was discovered by Toxina, Arteaga confirmed that everything was a farce and ended Tania's life. El Ángel, while trying to protect her, is also shot. Arteaga speaks with El Ángel before giving him another shot. He identifies him as Pegaso's son. Toxina kills Bólido.
108	48	"El Ángel sobrevivió al ataque de Arteaga pero se encuentra malherido"	15 November 2018	13 March 2019	1.7	0.32
El Ángel is cared for by some indigenous women near the attack, the sincere heart of Rosario will be the only remedy to save him. The news of the deaths in the restaurant is broadcast on TV. Antonio proposes to Paula that they get married. Venus sees Comino at the pharmacy. Toxina kidnaps Andrea and takes her with Arteaga, he asks if it is true that they have a daughter.
109	49	"Rosario y El Ángel empiezan una relación formal"	19 November 2018	14 March 2019	1.5	0.27
El Ángel recovers favorably from the shot and declares his love to Rosario. Arteaga is still investigating everything about his supposed daughter. Pamela confirms her suspicions about Eva, the coroner. Isaac investigates Tania's death and advises Antonio not to leave the country.
110	50	"Alberto descubrió toda la verdad sobre su amiga Alexandra"	20 November 2018	15 March 2019	1.5	0.33
Antonio blames Paula for the death of Bólido and Tania and refuses to marry her. Andrómeda transforms to Alberto to get the truth out of Comino. Arteaga confirmed that Rosario is alive, Jonás will be responsible for killing her. Comino tells Andrómeda everything that happened with Alexandra. During an indigenous ritual El Ángel and Rosario have hallucinations and return to the past. Pamela tells her boss that Rosario is alive and he fires her.
111	51	"Guarro descubre que Jonás es el infiltrado de El Ángel"	21 November 2018	18 March 2019	1.7	0.31
Toxina tells Arteaga that Jonás is the infiltrator and works for El Ángel. Arteaga believes that it is better to keep Jonás alive, he will be the bait for Rosario and El Ángel to fall easily. Rosario and El Ángel announce their relationship. Comino discovers Andrómeda's plan, tries to kill her but ultimately forgives her life. Antonio looks for Rosario in Espíritu Santo, gets work and accommodation in Don Delfino's canteen. He looks for Rosario and confesses that he loves her and wants to be with her.
112	52	"Antonio se mete a la boca del lobo"	22 November 2018	19 March 2019	1.7	0.32
El Ángel thanks Antonio for all the attention he has had with Rosario. Rosario just wants to be with El Ángel. Arteaga advances with the plan to discover Jonás. El Ángel's men kill Eva. Aurora learns that Andrómeda and her friends are investigating the death of Alexandra and are going after Rosario. Andrómeda threatens Rosario with a weapon to make her pay for Alexandra's death.
113	53	"Aurora llega al rescate de Rosario"	26 November 2018	20 March 2019	1.6	0.33
Andrómeda's and the girls' plans to assassinate Rosario are stopped by Aurora. Rosario intervenes to protect them. El Ángel gives them money to leave Espíritu Santo and never say anything. Arteaga locates El Ángel. Pamela decides to leave Isaac's house after learning that he lied to her and did not divorce his wife.
114	54	"Antonio descubre el laboratorio de El Ángel pero es recibido con plomo"	27 November 2018	21 March 2019	1.6	0.25
Gabriel will betray El Ángel and will support Antonio to get rid of him. Andrómeda, Venus, and Serena will also support Antonio. Rosario and Erik decide to leave Melva's house to live with El Ángel. Manuel and Isaac ask Pamela to rejoin the agency, but she refuses. El Ángel and Rosario prepare to travel to the city.
115	55	"La agente Pulido es reintegrada a la corporación y será la comandante responsable de capturar a Rosario"	28 November 2018	25 March 2019	1.5	0.28
Agent Medina is removed from Rosario's investigation. Manuel appoints Pamela as commander who decides that the investigations will focus on Rosario. Serena goes to look for Gabriel at El Ángel's house, but Aurora threatens her with a weapon so that she leaves. Antonio managed to put a secret camera in El Ángel's estate, his plan is still underway. Rosario and El Ángel inspect the land where they plan to ambush Arteaga. Genaro plays with John and calls him son for the first time.
116	56	"Toxina y sus hombres no tienen piedad, a quemarropa terminan con la vida Melba y Genaro"	29 November 2018	27 March 2019	1.6	0.34
Angel and Rosario fire at Arteaga's truck. Arteaga's plan went perfectly, El Ángel ended up killing his great friend Jonás. Toxina took advantage of the moment to attack Espíritu Santo to take revenge on El Ángel. Toxina is about to kill Erik, but Antonio defends him. Aurora and her men manage to drive away Toxina. The police investigate. Andrea's daughter, Laura, goes to look for her at the hospital and complains about the damage she did to her.
117	57	"Antonio tiene la prueba para hundir a El Ángel"	3 December 2018	28 March 2019	1.8	0.32
Pulido is in Espíritu Santo and follows Rosario. Antonio tries to convince Andrómeda and her friends to stay in town and fight El Ángel. Laura recognizes the possibility that El Ángel is her half brother. Comino is very sorry and asks for forgiveness. Antonio looks at the video he recorded of El Ángel and is shocked to hear the conversation.
118	58	"Rosario se siente traicionada por El Ángel"	4 December 2018	29 March 2019	1.8	0.34
Antonio showed the video to Rosario where El Ángel confesses that his priority is his business. Rosario feels used and fights him. She faints and discovers that she is pregnant and asks Luz not to tell anyone about her pregnancy. Andrómeda and the girls go to the procuracy to ask Isaac and Pamela to help identify Alexandra's body. Pamela verifies Guarro's history. El Ángel tries to choke Antonio for telling Rosario the truth and daring to enter his house to put cameras.
119	59	"La comandante Pulido confirma que Guarro es el infiltrado de Arteaga"	5 December 2018	1 April 2019	1.8	0.36
Pamela takes Guarro to a hotel room, gets him drunk and takes advantage of the moment to inspect his cell phone, confirms the relationship he has with Toxina. Rosario and Érik leave the hacienda. Aurora gives Erik a gun. Horacio welcomes them into his house. Rosario decides that Arteaga is no longer going to be killed and Erik is enraged. Issac confirms that the body of the lake is of Alexandra. Laura, Andrea's daughter meets El Ángel and confesses that she is his sister, but he tells her that her real father is Arteaga.
120	60	"Erick fue capturado por Toxina"	6 December 2018	2 April 2019	1.6	0.39
Erik wants to take revenge by his own hands and goes to execute Arteaga but Toxina finds him. Gabriel betrays El Ángel's trust, steals money from him. El Ángel tries to conquer Laura, but finds out about the theft, infuriates, and makes her leave. Rosario seeks help to find Erik. Serena, Venus and Andromeda say goodbye. Pamela and Isaac torture Guarro and force him to help them catch Arteaga.
121	61	"Rosario y Arteaga logran escapar del operativo sorpresa que organizó la comandante Pulido"	10 December 2018	3 April 2019	1.8	0.35
Pamela intercepts the conversations between Toxina and Arteaga thanks to the microphone that El Guarro planted. In this way she finds out that Rosario is going to meet Arteaga and decides to make an operation to capture them. Arteaga managed to escape in an ambulance, Rosario was rescued at the last minute by her father. Pulido has the curse of not being able to capture Rosario. Andromeda returns home, her mother and sister are surprised to see her.
122	62	"Antonio regresó a los brazos de Rosario"	11 December 2018	4 April 2019	1.5	0.29
Antonio arrives at the hotel where Rosario and Horacio are, with his help they will put together a plan to rescue Erik. Antonio tells Rosario that he wants to be the father of her son. Arteaga sets new conditions for the release of Erik. Antonio and Rosario decide to rob El Ángel's laboratory in order to negotiate Erik's freedom. El Ángel, to win over the population of a poor colony, takes a child who has suffered an accident to Laura's office. Aurora gets Venus' address and sends one of her men to follow her to find Gabriel.
123	63	"Arteaga le da un duro golpe al puerco policíaco"	12 December 2018	5 April 2019	1.8	0.30
After finding the microphone set by El Guarro, Arteaga and Toxina draw a plan to deceive Pamela and Isaac, what seems to be a meeting with the Dutchman ends up being the explosion of a bomb that kills several policemen. Rosario, Antonio and Comino plan the theft of the merchandise. El Ángel uses Laura to provide a medical service to the inhabitants of the poor colony.
124	64	"El Ángel sorprende a Rosario y a Antonio justo cuando salían con la mercancía robada"	13 December 2018	8 April 2019	2.2	0.35
El Ángel intercepts Tulio, kills him and threatens Rosario and Antonio. Rosario explains that the merchandise is to free Erik. Angel decides to help them. Pulido captures one of Arteaga's men, but he does not want to release information.
125	65	"Aurora ejecuta por la espalda a Antonio"	16 December 2018	9 April 2019	2.6	0.34 0.27 0.40
126	66	"El Mini Pig le dispara a Arteaga"	16 December 2018	10 April 2019	2.6	0.34 0.27 0.40
127	67	"Rosario y Arteaga son capturados"	16 December 2018	11 April 2019	2.6	0.34 0.27 0.40
Antonio confronts El Ángel and makes him see that he only manipulated Rosario. Aurora comes to save El Ángel's life and kills Antonio. They invent that Arteaga's men entered the house and murdered him. Venus tells Isaac that El Ángel gave the order to kill Alexandra, with this proof Isaac goes to El Ángel's estate to arrest him. Rosario takes Antonio's body to a river. Horacio goes in search of Issac and Pamela, and gives them information. Arteaga sends Rosario a video of Erik and she gets furious. Rosario meets Toxina to retrieve Erik. Pamela interrupts an important talk between Arteaga and Rosario. Rosario is tricked by Toxina, Erik's release was a trap. Rosario gives herself in exchange for Erik. The events that lead to the capture of Arteaga and Rosario by the police take place in a cement factory. El Ángel wounds Arteaga and Erik kills Toxina. El Ángel manages to escape with Erik. Rosario Tijeras is found guilty and sentenced to 40 years in prison. Rosario asks forgiveness for all the people she hurt.
