= Alexa Martín =

Mexican television actress

- Born: Alexa Martín-Moreno
- Occupation: Actress
- Years active: 2015–present
- Spouse: Erick Chapa (m. 2017)
- Children: 1

Alexa Martín-Moreno artistically known as Alexa Martín is a Mexican television actress; best known for her role of Leticia Bethancourt in the Mexican version of the Colombian series Rosario Tijeras. Her first leading role was in the TV Azteca drama series Tres Milagros, a Mexican adaptation of the Colombian series of the same name. She is a graduate from the TV Azteca art training center (CEFAT) in 2015.

== Personal life ==
She is married with the actor Erick Chapa, the wedding ceremony was held on 3 February 2017 at Hacienda La Escoba, in Jalisco. They both became parents on 25 October 2019, when their first child, whom they called Lorenzo, was born.

== Filmography ==
Television performances
Year	Title	Roles	Notes
2015–2016	UEPA! Un escenario para amar	Marisel de los Arcos	
2016	Un día cualquiera	Linda Cynthia	Episode: "Homosexualidad femenina" Episode: "Brujería"
2016–2017	Rosario Tijeras	Leticia Bethancourt	Series regular (season 1); 53 episodes
2018	Tres Milagros	Milagros Rendón	Main role; 55 episodes
2018	Diablero	Lucía	Episodes: "The Demons are Among Us"
2019	Un poquito tuyo	Madonna Rosales	Series regular; 71 episodes
2020	La Doña	Fernanda Céspedes	Series regular (season 2); 49 episodes
2020–2021	Falsa identidad	Victoria Lamas / Valentina Acosta	Main role (season 2); 21 episodes
2022	Mujer de nadie	Michelle	Series regular; 45 episodes
2022	El rey, Vicente Fernández	Rosa	Recurring role; 8 episodes
2024	Marea de pasiones	Beatriz Marrero Grajales	Series regular; 65 episodes
2024	Sed de venganza	Elisa del Pino	Main role
