= Rosario Tijeras (Mexican TV series) =

Mexican television series

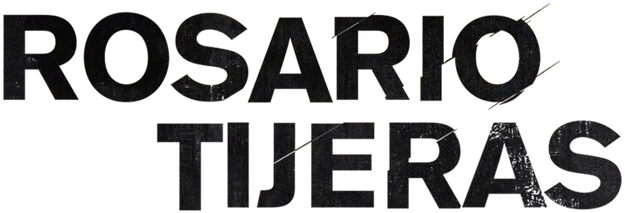
- Genre: Telenovela
- Created by: Adriana Pelusi; Carlos Quintanilla
- Screenplay by: Carlos Duplat; Luz Mariela Santofimio; Lina Arboleda; Pedro Miguel Rozo; Andrés Montaya; Berenice Cárdenas; Joaquín Casasola; Mariana Palos; Alejandra Rodríguez; Miguel García Moreno
- Story by: Jorge Franco
- Directed by: Chavas Cartas; Alejandro Lozano; Bonnie Cartas; Rolando Ocampo; Erik Baeza; Rodrigo Lalinde; Danny Gavidia; Víctor Herrera McNaught; David R. Romay; Sergio Siruela
- Creative director: Marisa Pecanins
- Opening theme: "El Destino" by Luis "Luca" Ortega
- Country of origin: Mexico
- Original language: Spanish
- No. of seasons: 5
- No. of episodes: 277 (list of episodes)

Production
- Executive producers: Ximena Cantuarias; Daniel Ucrós; Juan Pablo Posada; Karina Blanco; Bárbara de Regil; Carlos Quintanilla; Alejandro García
- Producers: Cynthia Martínez Medina; Celia Iturriaga; Carlos Rueda; Araceli Sanchez Mariscal
- Editors: Elsa Vázquez; Luis Patiño; Carlos Caridad Montero
- Camera setup: Multi-camera
- Running time: 43 minutes
- Production companies: Sony Pictures Television; Teleset

Original release
- Network: Azteca 13
- Release: 30 October 2016 – 30 January 2017
- Network: Azteca 7
- Release: 27 August 2018 – 14 December 2019
- Network: Netflix
- Release: 18 June 2025 – present

Related
- Rosario Tijeras

Rosario Tijeras is a Mexican telenovela created by Adriana Pelusi and Carlos Quintanilla that premiered on Azteca 13 on 30 October 2016, and ended on 14 December 2019 on Azteca 7. The series based on the Colombian drama of the same name produced in 2010 and starring María Fernanda Yépez. It stars Bárbara de Regil as the titular character. The series follows the life of a young student with behavior problems who suffers abuse and abuses by her stepfather and decides to start making her life on the wrong path to drugs and take revenge on all who hurt her.

In May 2023, the series was renewed for a fourth season that premiered on 18 June 2025. In September 2025, the series was renewed for a fifth season that premiered on 10 June 2026.

== Seasons ==
Season	Episodes	Originally released		
Season	Episodes	First released	Last released	Network
1	60	30 October 2016	30 January 2017	Azteca 13
2	67	27 August 2018	16 December 2018	Azteca 7
3	70	25 August 2019	14 December 2019	Azteca 7
4	40	18 June 2025		Netflix

Rosario (Bárbara de Regil) is a young student who, for the sake of destiny, becomes a hitman for León El Guero (Hernán Mendoza) together with her brother Brandon (Luis Alberti) and El Fierro (Christian Vázquez), all since raped by criminals in her neighborhood where she lives, and the murder of her best friend. In her first revenge, Rosario meets Cacho (Iván Raday), her main aggressor to seduce him in her house and finally stab him in the genitals, thus earning her nickname Rosario Tijeras. Later, Rosario murders Gonzalo González "El General" (José Sefami), after he killed Delia (Daniela Soto) her best friend. For Rosario, "Loving is more difficult than killing", since she will be involved in a love triangle between Emilio (Antonio Gaona) and Antonio (José María de Tavira) thus causing a rivalry between these two friends for the heart of Rosario.

In season 2, after having escaped death, Rosario and Antonio finally manage to evade their enemies to be free, but as they flee they are forced to separate from each other. Rosario is fooled by El Ángel (Sebastián Martínez) a mysterious and seductive man who hides a deep secret. Following this, Rosario will be crossroads in a vengeance between two criminal lords and will have to protect her little brother and Antonio, the great love of her life.

In season 3, Rosario's world collapses when her daughter, Ruby, is kidnapped. To recover her, she will have to accept to collaborate with the police, being part of an elite squad dedicated to the capture of El Ángel. Rosario must work against the clock and with the feelings to the surface, because in the neighborhood nothing is what it seems.

In season 4, Rosario, who was presumed dead, emerges from the ashes — and she'll do anything to find her daughter, Ruby, and keep her out of harm's way. After hearing news that the adoptive parents of Ruby, were brutally murdered, Rosario heads out on a desperate search to find her at all costs. By the time Rosario finds her, Ruby is living at a shelter. When the two finally reunite, Ruby wants nothing to do with her biological mom.

== Cast and characters ==
Main cast and characters
Actor	Character	Seasons				
Actor	Character	1	2	3	4	5
Bárbara de Regil	María del Rosario López Ramos "Rosario Tijeras"	Main	Main	Main	Main	Main
José María de Tavira	Antonio Bethancourt	Main	Main	Guest		
Antonio Gaona	Emilio Echegaray	Main				
Hernán Mendoza	León Elías Arteaga	Main	Main	Guest	Guest	Main
Vanessa Bauche	Ruby	Main				
Christian Vázquez	Ferney / Fierro	Main				
José Sefami	Gonzalo González "El General"	Main				
Ariel López Padilla	Camilo Echegaray	Main				
Hugo Albores	Cristóbal	Main				
Sophie Gómez	Marta de Bethancourt	Main	Recurring			
Rocío Verdejo	Susana	Main				
María Fernanda Quiroz	Yolanda	Main				
Ariana Ron Pedrique	Paula Restrepo	Main				
Pakey Vázquez	Tobías	Main				
Dino García	Leonardo	Main				
Alexa Martín	Leticia Bethancourt	Main				
Pia Watson	Samantha	Main				
Pascacio López	El Peludo	Main				
Ruy Senderos	Damián González	Main				
Eduardo Victoria	Luis Enrique Bethancourt	Main	Recurring			
Luis Alberti	Brandon López Morales	Main			Guest	
Sebastián Martínez	Daniel Salgado "El Ángel"		Main	Main	Guest	Main
Danny Perea	Pamela		Main			
Verónica Langer	Aurora		Main	Main		
Harold Azuara	Erik		Main	Main		
Christian Chávez	Guarro		Main			
Claudio Lafarga	Gabriel		Main			
Sonia Couoh	Melva		Main			
Mario Loría	Jonás		Main			
Gabriel Casanova	Isaac Medina	Guest	Main			
Lucía Silva	Paula Restrepo		Main			
Israel Islas	Toxina		Main			
Leonardo Alonso	Génaro		Main			
Ignacio Riva Palacio	Andrómeda		Main			
Palmeira Cruz	Venus		Main			
Tatiana Martínez	Serena		Main			
Lizzy Auna	Alexandra		Main			
Marina Victoria	Tania		Main			
Alan Castillo	John		Main			
Fernando Ciangherotti	Pegaso		Main			
Yolanda Ventura	Andrea		Main			
Juan Pablo Campa	Dylan			Main		
Mauricio Islas	General Iriarte			Main		
Samadhi Zendejas	Géminis			Main		
Pamela Almanza	Laura Peralta		Recurring	Main		
Antonio Sotillo	Pablo Morales			Main		
Marina Ruíz	Pamela			Main		
Alejandro Guerrero	Capitán Bravo			Main		
Marco León	Máicol			Main		
Nikole Barajas	Rubí			Main		
Guillermo Nava	Verdugo			Main		
Renata Vaca	Julieth			Main		
Roberto Duarte	Altamirano			Main		
Jorge Lan	Agustín			Main		
Christian Vega	Bernardo			Main		
Claudette Maillé	Vanesa			Main		
Roberto Montiel	Don Pacho			Main		
Laura Ferretti	Marisol			Main		
Francisco Angelini	Juan Antonio				Main	Main
Iván Arana	Gael				Main	
Samantha Acuña	Ruby				Main	Main
Roberto Sosa	Américo				Main	
Susana Zabaleta	La Tata				Main	
Cecilia Toussaint	Betty				Main	
Luis Fernando Peña	El Papi				Main	
Asbel Ramses	Teo				Main	
Anette Michel	Victoria				Main	Recurring
Daniel Martínez	Moya				Main	
Tomás Goros	Porfirio					Main
Vanessa Acosta	Macaria				Main	
Morganna Love	Sirena				Main	
Erick Cañete	Huesos				Main	
Regina Reynoso	Claudia				Main	
Adrián Escalona	Domingo				Main	
Mariana Zaragoza	Vanessa				Main	

Recurring cast and characters
Actor	Character	Seasons				
Actor	Character	1	2	3	4	5
Erick Chapa	Juan José	Recurring				
Luz Ramos	Rocío	Recurring				
Giuseppe Gamba	Sudarsky	Recurring				
Alonso Espeleta	Chávez	Recurring				
Constantino Morán	Querubín	Recurring	Recurring			
Juan José Pucheta	Manuel Osorno		Recurring			
Begoña Narváez	Martina			Recurring		
Jordi Rush	Santiago			Recurring		
Gaby Mellado	Ximena				Recurring	
Manuel Alcaraz	El Tuerto				Recurring	
Manuel Sevilla	Estrada				Recurring	
Said Sandoval	Payaso				Recurring	

== Production ==
In February 2016, TV Azteca showed interest in producing a remake of the Colombian series of the same name that Sony Pictures Television and Teleset made for RCN Televisión in the early 2010s, which TV Azteca would be making under the co-production of Sony Pictures Television and initiating a strategic alliance for 4 years. The series began production and filming on 18 July 2016, confirming Bárbara de Regil, José María de Tavira and Antonio Gaona in the lead roles. Filming on location took place in the La Presa neighborhood on the southeastern slopes of Cerro del Chiquihuite, in the municipality of Tlalnepantla de Baz in the State of Mexico. The first season was directed by Salvador "Chava" Cartas and Alejandro Lozano "El Patas".

On 19 January 2017, TV Azteca renewed the series for a second season. Filming for season two began on 21 November 2017, and concluded on 5 June 2018 in Mexico City. This season had the addition of actors such as Danny Perea, Verónica Langer and Christian Chávez, among others, including the addition of Colombian actor Sebastián Martínez, who also participated in the Colombian version, in the role of Emilio, and for this version he joins the cast playing Ángel Salgado.

On 16 December 2018, it was announced through Azteca 7's social media accounts that the series was renewed for a third season. Pre-production for the season began in late November 2018. On 8 January 2019, it was announced that the season will be the final season of the series. Filming for season two began on 21 January 2019, and concluded on 24 June 2019.

On 29 May 2023, John Rossiter of Sony Pictures Television announced that a fourth season of the series was being developed. Filming of the season began on 2 May 2024 and ended on 5 August 2024. In May 2025, it was announced that Netflix would premiere the fourth season on 18 June 2025. On 11 September 2025, Sony Pictures Television announced that a fifth season of the series was in production. The season premiered on 10 June 2026.

== Reception ==
=== Ratings ===
Season	Timeslot (CT)	Episodes	First aired		Last aired	
Season	Timeslot (CT)	Episodes	Date	Viewers (millions)	Date	Viewers (millions)
1	Mon–Fri 9:00pm	60	30 October 2016	10.5 (Note: Audience in points.)	30 January 2017	12.4
2	Mon–Thurs 10:30pm	67	27 August 2018	2.7	16 December 2018	2.6
3	Mon–Thurs 10:30pm	70	25 August 2019	1.9	14 December 2019	2.3

=== Awards and nominations ===
Year	Award	Category	Nominated	Result
2017	Produ Awards	Súper serie of the Year	Rosario Tijeras	Nominated

== Soundtrack ==
Rosario Tijeras Canciones Originales de la Serie

Soundtrack album by Luis "Luca" Ortega
- Released: 5 July 2022
- Length: 15:55

The soundtrack of the telenovela was officially released on 5 July 2022.

No.	Title	Artist(s)	Length
1.	"El Destino"	Luis "Luca" Ortega	3:39
2.	"Para Hacer Historia"	Luis "Luca" Ortega	2:45
3.	"No Confies"	Luis "Luca" Ortega, Camilo Froideval, Ana Rosul	3:07
4.	"Líbranos del Mal"	Luis "Luca" Ortega	2:36
5.	"Mil Te Quieros"	Luis "Luca" Ortega, Ana Rosul	3:47
Total length:			15:55
