= Rosario Tijeras (Mexican TV series) season 4 =

Rosario Tijeras
- Season 4
- Starring: Bárbara de Regil; Francisco Angelini; Iván Arana; Samantha Acuña
- No. of episodes: 40

Release
- Original network: Netflix
- Original release: 18 June 2025

Season chronology
- ← Previous; Season 3

The fourth season of the Mexican television series Rosario Tijeras was announced on 29 May 2023. The season was released on Netflix on 18 June 2025. The season centers on Ruby, the teenage daughter of Rosario Tijeras, who grapples with the memory of her mother while facing the burdens of Rosario's legacy and the unfolding revelations about her family's history.

== Plot ==
After sacrificing herself to save the town from a bomb at the end of the third season, Rosario Tijeras is declared dead. However, she survives the explosion and is rescued by Sirena, who heals her wounds and offers her shelter. When she recovers, Rosario desperately searches for her daughter Ruby, but discovers that she was adopted by a good family. For years, Rosario watches her from afar until the adoptive parents are killed in a robbery and she again loses track of her.

When Rosario finally finds Ruby, she is a rebellious teenager who hates the woman who gave her life. To get closer to her, Rosario pretends to be a battered woman and infiltrates the shelter where Ruby lives. There she meets psychologist Juan Antonio, who becomes her new love interest. After the kidnapping of Vanessa, Ruby's friend, Rosario realizes that Don Américo and El Papi are behind it all. Rosario kills El Papi's henchman, Payaso, to stop him from kidnapping Ruby, which exposes her identity. Upon discovering the truth, Ruby rejects Rosario.

The authorities discover that Rosario is alive and resume their search for her. Meanwhile, Papi seeks to avenge his friend's death. Gael, a policeman infiltrated in Don Américo and Papi's organization, joins Rosario to capture their enemies and ends up becoming romantically involved with her. Meanwhile, despite her mother's warnings, Ruby falls in love with Teo, Papi's brother, and tells him her true origin, which puts her in danger.

== Cast ==
=== Main ===
- Bárbara de Regil as María del Rosario López Ramos "Rosario Tijeras"
- Francisco Angelini as Juan Antonio
- Iván Arana as Gael
- Samantha Acuña as Ruby
- Roberto Sosa as Américo
- Susana Zabaleta
- Cecilia Toussaint as Betty
- Luis Fernando Peña as El Papi
- Asbel Ramses as Teo
- Anette Michel as Victoria
- Daniel Martínez as Moya
- Tomás Goros as Porfirio
- Vanessa Acosta as Macaria
- Morganna Love as Sirena
- Erick Cañete as Huesos
- Regina Reynoso as Claudia
- Adrián Escalona as Domingo
- Mariana Zaragoza as Vanessa

=== Recurring and guest stars ===
- Luis Alberti as Brandon López Morales
- Gaby Mellado as Ximena
- Manuel Alcaraz as El Tuerto
- Manuel Sevilla as Estrada
- Said Sandoval as Payaso
- Hernán Mendoza as León Elías Arteaga
- Sebastián Martínez as Daniel Salgado "El Ángel"

== Episodes ==
No. overall	No. in season	Title	Original release date	Azteca Uno air date	Mexico linear viewers (millions)
198	1	"Episode 1"	18 June 2025	18 August 2025	1.53
199	2	"Episode 2"	18 June 2025	19 August 2025	1.39
200	3	"Episode 3"	18 June 2025	20 August 2025	1.44
201	4	"Episode 4"	18 June 2025	21 August 2025	1.55
202	5	"Episode 5"	18 June 2025	22 August 2025	1.15
203	6	"Episode 6"	18 June 2025	25 August 2025	1.27
204	7	"Episode 7"	18 June 2025	26 August 2025	1.37
205	8	"Episode 8"	18 June 2025	27 August 2025	1.54
206	9	"Episode 9"	18 June 2025	28 August 2025	1.35
207	10	"Episode 10"	18 June 2025	29 August 2025	1.41
208	11	"Episode 11"	18 June 2025	1 September 2025	N/A
209	12	"Episode 12"	18 June 2025	2 September 2025	N/A
210	13	"Episode 13"	18 June 2025	3 September 2025	N/A
211	14	"Episode 14"	18 June 2025	4 September 2025	N/A
212	15	"Episode 15"	18 June 2025	5 September 2025	N/A
213	16	"Episode 16"	18 June 2025	8 September 2025	N/A
214	17	"Episode 17"	18 June 2025	9 September 2025	N/A
215	18	"Episode 18"	18 June 2025	10 September 2025	N/A
216	19	"Episode 19"	18 June 2025	11 September 2025	N/A
217	20	"Episode 20"	18 June 2025	12 September 2025	N/A
218	21	"Episode 21"	18 June 2025	15 September 2025	N/A
219	22	"Episode 22"	18 June 2025	16 September 2025	N/A
220	23	"Episode 23"	18 June 2025	17 September 2025	N/A
221	24	"Episode 24"	18 June 2025	18 September 2025	N/A
222	25	"Episode 25"	18 June 2025	19 September 2025	N/A
223	26	"Episode 26"	18 June 2025	22 September 2025	N/A
224	27	"Episode 27"	18 June 2025	23 September 2025	N/A
225	28	"Episode 28"	18 June 2025	24 September 2025	N/A
226	29	"Episode 29"	18 June 2025	25 September 2025	N/A
227	30	"Episode 30"	18 June 2025	26 September 2025	N/A
228	31	"Episode 31"	18 June 2025	29 September 2025	N/A
229	32	"Episode 32"	18 June 2025	30 September 2025	N/A
230	33	"Episode 33"	18 June 2025	1 October 2025	N/A
231	34	"Episode 34"	18 June 2025	2 October 2025	N/A
232	35	"Episode 35"	18 June 2025	3 October 2025	N/A
233	36	"Episode 36"	18 June 2025	6 October 2025	N/A
234	37	"Episode 37"	18 June 2025	7 October 2025	N/A
235	38	"Episode 38"	18 June 2025	8 October 2025	N/A
236	39	"Episode 39"	18 June 2025	7 October 2025	N/A
237	40	"Episode 40"	18 June 2025	8 October 2025	N/A

== Production ==
On 29 May 2023, Sony Pictures Television announced that a fourth season of Rosario Tijeras was being developed. Filming of the season took place from 2 May 2024 to 5 August 2024.

== Release ==
The season premiered on 18 June 2025 on Netflix. The season made its broadcast television premiere on Azteca Uno on 18 August 2025.
