= Pa' seguirte queriendo =

2026 Colombian telenovela

- Genre: Telenovela
- Based on: Papá a toda madre by Montserrat Gómez García
- Developed by: Juan Andrés Granados
- Written by: Juan Andrés Granados; Paola Arias; Andrea López Jaramillo
- Directed by: Israel Sánchez; Luis Carlos Sierra
- Composers: Nicolas Uribe; Sebastián Luengas; Martha Lucía Miranda; Juan Pablo Martínez
- Country of origin: Colombia
- Original language: Spanish

Production
- Executive producers: Juan Pablo Posada; Yalile Giordanelli
- Cinematography: Germán Plata; Juan José Beltrán
- Editor: Marcela Vásquez
- Production company: RCN Televisión

Original release
- Network: Canal RCN
- Release: 21 July 2026 – present

Pa' seguirte queriendo is a Colombian telenovela produced by RCN Televisión. It is a sequel to the 2020 telenovela Pa' quererte. The series stars Sebastián Martínez, Juliette Pardau and Hanny Vizcaíno. It premiered on Canal RCN on 21 July 2026.

== Cast ==
=== Main ===
- Sebastián Martínez as Mauricio Reina De La Hoz
- Juliette Pardau as Daniela "Dany" Daza
- Carlos Camacho as Antonio José "Toño" Perdomo
- Luis Eduardo Arango as Octavio Victoria
- Laura de León as Azucena Tinoco
- Manuel Sarmiento as Jorge Morales
- Juliana Galvis as María Dolores "Lola" Montero
- Diana Wiswell as Catalina Vengoechea
- Natalia Jerez as Lorena Arango
- Aída Morales as Elvira Mora
- Alejandra Ávila as Milagros Victoria Mora
- Hanny Vizcaíno as Isabel Reina Trujillo
- David Martínez as Santiago Arango
- Sharon Delgado as Consuelo Ríos Daza
- Antonella Sánchez
- Andrés Mathias Rincón

=== Recurring and guest stars ===
- Marianela González as Luisa Ortega
- Variel Sánchez as Lorenzo Ríos
- Carlos Fernández as Felipe Urdaneta
- Camila Jurado as Juliana Morales Vengoechea
- Mónica Pardo as María Trujillo
- Silvia de Dios as Clemencia
- Horacio Tavera as Oscar Benítez
- Amparo Conde as Amanda

== Production ==
In December 2025, Pa' seguirte queriendo was announced as part of Canal RCN's programming for 2026. Filming began the following month.
