= Samadhi Zendejas =

Mexican actress

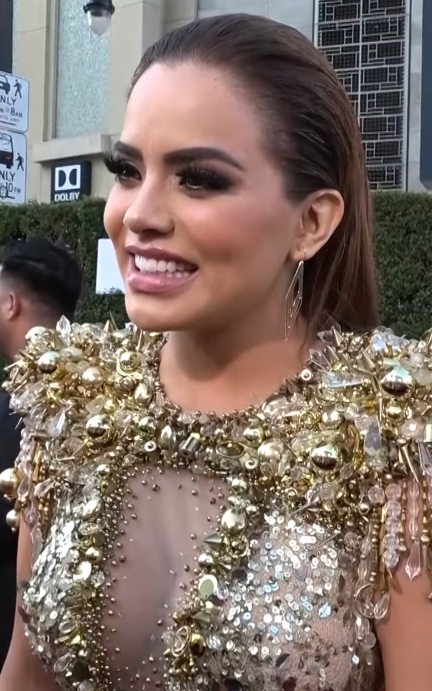
- Zendejas in 2018
- Born: Jill Samadhi Zendejas Adriano; December 27, 1995 (age 30); Mexico City, Distrito Federal, Mexico
- Occupation: Actress

Samadhi Zendejas (born December 27, 1994) also known simply as Samadhi, is a Mexican actress and performer. She played the lead role of Nuria García in the Telemundo telenovela Vuelve a mí.

== Personal life ==
Samadhi Zendejas is the eldest sister of Mexican actors Adriano Zendejas and Dassana Zendejas. She attend classes at Televisa's acting school Centro de Educación Artística (CEA) in Mexico City. In 2009, she got her first acting role in Atrevete a Soñar as Amaya, and was also in a previous relationship with actor Alejandro Speitzer.

In 2017, Samadhi portrayed the role of Jenni Rivera in the biographical telenovela Mariposa de Barrio. In 2018, she played the roles of Mamba in Enemigo íntimo and Circe in Falsa identidad. In 2019, Samadhi played Géminis in Rosario Tijeras. In October 2020, she was also featured at the New York Times Square.

In 2023, Samadhi played her first lead role in the telenovela Vuelve a mí as Nuria García, a Mexican seamstress from Ciudad Juárez who is a single mother to her seven-year-old son.

In September 2024, Samadhi walked at the Paris Fashion Week in the L'Oréal's Le Défilé "Walk Your Worth" show alongside various Latina celebrities.

== Filmography ==
Year	Title	Role	Notes
2009–2010	Atrévete a soñar	Amaya Villalba	
2010	Gritos de muerte y libertad	Matilde	Episode: El primer sueño: 1808
2011	Mujeres Asesinas 3	Lorena	Episode: Marta, manipuladora
2011	La rosa de Guadalupe	Imelda	Episode: La trampa
2011–2016	Como dice el dicho	Various roles	7 episodes
2011–2012	Esperanza del corazón	Abril Figueroa Guzmán	Main role
2016	Un camino hacia el destino	Nadia	Recurring role
2017	Mariposa de Barrio	Jenni Rivera (young)	34 episodes
2017	Milagros de Navidad	Candelaria Cruz	Episode: "La pesadilla de Candelaria"
2018	Enemigo íntimo	María Antonia Reyes "Mamba"	Main role (season 1)
2018–2021	Falsa identidad	Circe Gaona	Main role
2018	El Rey del Valle	Rosario	
2019	Rosario Tijeras	Géminis	Main role (season 3)
2022	La mujer del diablo	Candela Mendoza	Main role
2023–2024	Vuelve a mí	Nuria García	Lead role
2027	Todavía te amo	Natasha Palacios	Main role

== Awards ==
=== Premios TVyNovelas ===
Year	Category	Telenovela	Result
2010	Best Female Revelation	Atrevete a Soñar	Won
