= Falsa identidad =

American television series

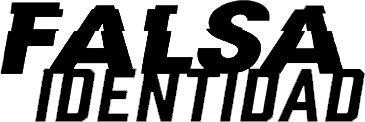
- Genre: Telenovela
- Created by: Perla Farías
- Written by: Sergio Mendoza
- Directed by: Conrado Martínez; Diego Muñoz; Jorge Rios
- Starring: Camila Sodi; Luis Ernesto Franco; Sergio Goyri; Samadhi Zendejas; Eduardo Yáñez; Sonya Smith; Alejandro Camacho; Dulce María; Azela Robinson; Alexa Martín
- Opening theme: "Mi destino" by Fede Castillo & Leha Martínez
- Country of origin: United States
- Original language: Spanish
- No. of seasons: 2
- No. of episodes: 169

Production
- Executive producers: Marcos Santana; David Posada; Ivan Aranda
- Producer: Paty Benítez
- Camera setup: Multi-camera
- Production companies: Argos Comunicación; Telemundo Global Studios

Original release
- Network: Telemundo
- Release: 11 September 2018 – 25 January 2021

Falsa identidad (English: False Identity/Fake Identity) is an American drama television series created by Perla Farías and written by Sergio Mendoza. Produced by Telemundo Global Studios and Argos Comunicación. The series stars Camila Sodi and Luis Ernesto Franco. It premiered on Telemundo on 11 September 2018 and began airing on Netflix in 2019.

The series was presented during the Telemundo upfront for the 2018–2019 television season, and revolves around two complete strangers who have to assume the identity of a solid marriage to escape their past and escape their enemies.

On 21 January 2019, Telemundo confirmed that the show had been renewed for a second season. The season premiered on 22 September 2020 and concluded on 25 January 2021.

== Plot ==
=== Season 1 (2018–19) ===
Isabel (Camila Sodi) and Diego (Luis Ernesto Franco) are two strangers who must flee from their past to escape their enemies. Diego left his family after his father died and his mother remarried. In an act of rebellion, and to punish what he considers a betrayal of his father's memory, Diego gets involved in a criminal world, selling fuel to Sonora's most powerful drug dealer, Gavino Gaona (Sergio Goyri). Things got complicated when Diego, being the boyfriend of Gavino's daughter, also ends up having an affair with his wife, thus putting a price on his head.

For her part, Isabel marries Porfirio "El Corona" (Marcus Ornellas) at the age of fifteen years old. He was a member of a norteña music group, whose career was just beginning to take off. Over the years, El Corona's career dies, and he becomes a bitter and neurotic jealous man, who physically abuses Isabel for any excuse. Isabel endures the abuse thinking it is best for the children and to keep the family united until one day the violence of El Corona reaches her children: Amanda (Barbie Casillas) and Ricardo (Checo Perezcuadra).

Isabel escapes from her husband's house with her children, and finds refuge in Zoraida (Marcela Manriquez), a maid that works for Eliseo Hidalgo (Manuel Balbi), the mayor of Álamos, Sonora. Diego, who is the mayor's brother, also hides from the narco in the same house. It is there that their paths cross for the first time, and permanently. Eliseo devises a plan to hide Diego outside of Sonora, taking the identity of an American tourist who has just died in Sonora with his wife and son. To complete the farce, Isabel must pretend to be Diego's wife and have Ricardo act as their child.

Although this decision is the opportunity that Isabel was looking for to escape from El Corona, it also means leaving her oldest daughter behind, and trusting a man she has just met. Isabel and Diego begin their new life in Mexico City, at first they are complete opposites, but they learn to trust in each other. El Corona and the narcos do not take long to go after them, the past always finds them. But in the middle of persecution, Isabel and Diego discover a passion and chemistry that they had never experienced before, and there is only one step from here to real love.

== Cast ==
=== Main ===
- Luis Ernesto Franco as Diego Hidalgo / Emiliano Guevara
- Camila Sodi as Isabel / Camila Guevara
- Sergio Goyri as Gavino Gaona (season 1)
- Samadhi Zendejas as Circe Gaona
- Eduardo Yáñez as Don Mateo
- Sonya Smith as Fernanda Orozco
- Alejandro Camacho as Augusto Orozco (season 1)
- Dulce María as Victoria Lamas (season 2, episodes 4–56)
- Azela Robinson as Ramona (recurring, season 1; main, season 2)
- Alexa Martín as Victoria Lamas (season 2, episodes 58–78)

=== Also main ===
- Uriel del Toro as Joselito
- Álvaro Guerrero as Ignacio Salas
- Geraldine Bazán as Marlene (season 1)
- Gabriela Roel as Felipa
- Marcus Ornellas as Porfirio Corona (season 1)
- Gimena Gómez as Nuria
- Pepe Gámez as Deivid
- Vanesa Restrepo as Paloma (season 1)
- Claudia Zepeda as Diana Gutiérrez
- Toño Valdes as Chucho
- Carla Giraldo as Silvia
- Juliette Pardau as Gabriela (season 1)
- Martijn Kuiper as Jim (season 1)
- Rebeca Manríquez as Zoraida
- Pedro Hernández as Piochas (season 1)
- Alejandra Zaid as Lourdes (season 1)
- Hugo Catalán as Eric (season 1)
- Fernando Memije as Ramiro (season 1)
- Carlos Tavera as El Topo (season 1)
- Eduardo Garzón as El Pelos (season 1)
- Carlos Ramírez Ruelas as Maton (season 1)
- Mauricio de Montellano as Brandon (season 1)
- Manuel Balbi as Eliseo Hidalgo (season 1)
- Barbie Casillas as Amanda
- Checo Perezcuadra as Ricardo / Max Guevara
- Jean Paul Leroux as Alex
- Marco de la O as El Buitre (season 2)
- Vanessa Acosta as Juliana Hernández (season 2)
- Rubén Sanz as Father Rafael (season 2)
- David Palacio as El Man (season 2)
- Abril Schreiber as Gabriela (season 2)
- Pascacio López (season 2)
- Ana Jimena Villanueva as Rosa (season 2)
- Victor Olveira as Darwin Herfer (season 2)
- Arnoldo Picazzo as Mauricio (season 2)
- Latin Lover as El Mister (season 2)
- Vicky Araico as Guadalupe Girón (season 2)
- Sebastián Dante as El Cachorro (season 2)
- Miguel Jiménez as Alberto (season 2)
- Otto Sirgo as El Apá (season 2)

== Television ratings ==
Viewership and ratings per season of Falsa identidad
Season	Timeslot (ET)	Episodes	First aired		Last aired		Avg. viewers (millions)
Season	Timeslot (ET)	Episodes	Date	Viewers (millions)	Date	Viewers (millions)	Avg. viewers (millions)
1	Mon–Fri 9:00 p.m.	91	11 September 2018	1.58	21 January 2019	1.66	1.32
2	Mon–Fri 10:00 p.m.	71	22 September 2020	0.91	25 January 2021	TBD	0.82

== Episodes ==
=== Series overview ===
Series	Episodes	Originally released	
Series	Episodes	First released	Last released
1	91	11 September 2018	21 January 2019
2	78	22 September 2020	25 January 2021

=== Season 1 (2018–19) ===
No. overall	No. in season	Title	Original release date	US viewers (millions)
1	1	"El desafío de Isabel y Diego"	11 September 2018	1.58
2	2	"Isabel y Diego huyen a EE.UU"	12 September 2018	1.68
3	3	"Circe traiciona a su padre"	13 September 2018	1.50
4	4	"Gavino amenaza a Circe"	14 September 2018	1.36
5	5	"Circe tiene sexo con Joselito"	17 September 2018	1.57
6	6	"Isabel hace todo por su hija"	18 September 2018	1.42
7	7	"Circe pide la cabeza de Eliseo"	19 September 2018	1.48
8	8	"Diego se expone en televisión"	20 September 2018	1.48
9	9	"Isabel tiene un secreto"	21 September 2018	1.23
10	10	"Isabel y Diego se besan"	24 September 2018	1.55
11	11	"Eliseo sospecha de Augusto"	25 September 2018	1.43
12	12	"Isabel y Diego hacen el amor"	26 September 2018	1.46
13	13	"El rescate de Amanda"	27 September 2018	1.45
14	14	"Circe deja todo por Diego"	28 September 2018	1.19
15	15	"Circe mata al hermano de Diego"	1 October 2018	1.41
16	16	"Diego sufre por su hermano"	2 October 2018	1.37
17	17	"Atacan el velorio de Eliseo"	3 October 2018	1.46
18	18	"Isabel y Diego formalizan"	4 October 2018	1.36
19	19	"Fernanda queda en la calle"	5 October 2018	1.07
20	20	"Circe llega al Babel"	8 October 2018	1.33
21	21	"Joselito ordena un secuestro"	9 October 2018	1.33
22	22	"Gabino al borde de la muerte"	10 October 2018	1.42
23	23	"Circe arma su propio cártel"	11 October 2018	1.30
24	24	"El gran momento de Circe"	12 October 2018	1.27
25	25	"Diego se arma de coraje"	12 October 2018	1.27
26	26	"Diego rechaza a Circe"	15 October 2018	1.45
27	27	"Circe conoce a Camila"	16 October 2018	1.42
28	28	"Joselito deja vivir a Diego"	17 October 2018	1.49
29	29	"Joselito reconoce a Camila"	18 October 2018	1.41
30	30	"Camila le coquetea a Joselito"	19 October 2018	1.31
31	31	"Circe y Joselito cara a cara"	22 October 2018	1.48
32	32	"Isabel peligra en El Babel"	23 October 2018	1.30
33	33	"Diego se distancia de Isabel"	24 October 2018	1.42
34	34	"Circe quiere reclutar a Diego"	26 October 2018	1.14
35	35	"Circe llega a casa de Diego"	29 October 2018	1.35
36	36	"Isabel y Diego se reconcilian"	30 October 2018	1.27
37	37	"Circe recibe una amenaza"	31 October 2018	1.34
38	38	"La trampa contra Joselito"	1 November 2018	1.36
39	39	"Joselito manda un mensaje"	2 November 2018	1.15
40	40	"Circe recibe un golpe duro"	5 November 2018	1.41
41	41	"Isabel deja la farsa"	7 November 2018	1.24
42	42	"La suerte está con Circe"	8 November 2018	1.25
43	43	"Raptan a los hijos de Isabel"	9 November 2018	1.19
44	44	"Trampa para matar a Joselito"	12 November 2018	1.22
45	45	"Corona más cerca de la muerte"	13 November 2018	1.34
46	46	"Joselito va por Circe"	14 November 2018	1.27
47	47	"La pasión de Diego"	15 November 2018	1.30
48	48	"Isabel con el corazón roto"	16 November 2018	1.14
49	49	"Circe mueve sus fichas"	19 November 2018	1.38
50	50	"La dulce venganza de Circe"	20 November 2018	1.31
51	51	"Paloma enfrenta a Camila"	21 November 2018	1.23
52	52	"La sorpresa de Circe y Diego"	23 November 2018	1.22
53	53	"La otra cara de Joselito"	26 November 2018	1.38
54	54	"Diego duerme con el enemigo"	27 November 2018	1.40
55	55	"Isabel al descubierto"	28 November 2018	1.37
56	56	"El nuevo plan de Diego"	29 November 2018	1.36
57	57	"Diego dispuesto a dar la cara"	30 November 2018	1.21
58	58	"Bomba de tiempo para Isabel"	3 December 2018	1.32
59	59	"Circe mata por Diego"	4 December 2018	1.30
60	60	"Circe queda en evidencia"	5 December 2018	1.22
61	61	"Acusan a Joselito públicamente"	6 December 2018	1.22
62	62	"Un alto precio para Circe"	7 December 2018	1.18
63	63	"El mundo de Circe se derrumba"	10 December 2018	1.21
64	64	"La Mami Chula castiga a Felipa"	11 December 2018	1.29
65	65	"Gavino prepara una sorpresa"	12 December 2018	1.41
66	66	"Todos a favor de Gavino Gaona"	13 December 2018	1.35
67	67	"La gran victoria de Gavino"	14 December 2018	1.17
68	68	"Gavino, el más peligroso"	17 December 2018	1.25
69	69	"Diego queda sin palabras"	18 December 2018	1.28
70	70	"Gavino golpea duro a Diego"	18 December 2018	1.28
71	71	"El hombre amado de Circe"	19 December 2018	1.20
72	72	"El encuentro de Circe y Diego"	20 December 2018	1.23
73	73	"La propuesta de Diego"	21 December 2018	1.05
74	74	"La sorpresa de la Mami Chula"	26 December 2018	1.32
75	75	"Isabel dispuesta a morir"	27 December 2018	1.22
76	76	"El trato del Cártel Gaona"	28 December 2018	1.27
77	77	"La pasión de Isabel y Diego"	1 January 2019	0.97
78	78	"Joselito ataca a Gavino"	2 January 2019	1.23
79	79	"Diego en las garras de Circe"	3 January 2019	1.19
80	80	"José tiene los días contados"	4 January 2019	1.17
81	81	"Joselito vive el infierno"	7 January 2019	1.31
82	82	"Circe recibe un regalo macabro"	8 January 2019	1.29
83	83	"Diego al descubierto"	9 January 2019	1.27
84	84	"El plan siniestro de Circe"	10 January 2019	1.32
85	85	"Diego contra Circe"	11 January 2019	1.21
86	86	"La difícil decisión de Diego"	14 January 2019	1.26
87	87	"Diego en la boca del lobo"	15 January 2019	1.27
88	88	"Raptan a Isabel y a sus hijos"	16 January 2019	1.20
89	89	"Circe acorrala a Gavino"	17 January 2019	1.27
90	90	"El duelo final de los Gaona"	18 January 2019	1.31
91	91	"Nueva vida de Isabel y Diego"	21 January 2019	1.66

=== Season 2 (2020–21) ===
No. overall	No. in season	Title	Original release date	US viewers (millions)
92	1	"Huir del presente"	22 September 2020	0.91
93	2	"La caída de Circe"	23 September 2020	0.79
94	3	"Todo queda atrás"	24 September 2020	0.73
95	4	"Un trato macabro"	25 September 2020	0.72
96	5	"Refugio eclesiástico"	28 September 2020	0.75
97	6	"Coincidencia incalculable"	30 September 2020	0.71
98	7	"Lealtad a prueba"	1 October 2020	0.76
99	8	"Revuelo en La Esperanza"	2 October 2020	0.66
100	9	"Reencuentro con los muertos"	5 October 2020	0.77
101	10	"Oportunidad de oro"	6 October 2020	0.79
102	11	"Los encantos de Isabel"	8 October 2020	0.60
103	12	"El refugio del Buitre"	9 October 2020	0.76
104	13	"La sangre llama"	12 October 2020	0.80
105	14	"Mateo va por más"	13 October 2020	0.76
106	15	"Provocación"	14 October 2020	0.85
107	16	"La carnada"	16 October 2020	0.79
108	17	"Asfixia"	19 October 2020	0.84
109	18	"Lágrimas de sangre"	20 October 2020	0.79
110	19	"El monstruo quiere negociar"	23 October 2020	0.81
111	20	"El huerfano de sus garras"	26 October 2020	0.75
112	21	"Juntos, pero no revueltos"	27 October 2020	0.80
113	22	"Traición imperdonable"	28 October 2020	0.81
114	23	"El Buitre come carroña"	29 October 2020	0.85
115	24	"La historia al reves"	30 October 2020	0.75
116	25	"El juramento de Amanda"	2 November 2020	0.70
117	26	"Batalla por la custodia"	4 November 2020	0.76
118	27	"La osadía"	5 November 2020	0.82
119	28	"Cara a cara en la corte"	6 November 2020	0.83
120	29	"Tambores de guerra"	9 November 2020	0.73
121	30	"A cualquier precio"	10 November 2020	0.77
122	31	"La misión"	11 November 2020	0.79
123	32	"Rumbo al más allá"	12 November 2020	0.83
124	33	"Impulsos del corazón"	13 November 2020	0.88
125	34	"Tras una pista de Salas"	16 November 2020	0.76
126	35	"Mateo saca el látigo"	17 November 2020	0.90
127	36	"Por las nalgas de Circe"	18 November 2020	0.71
128	37	"En busca del traidor"	19 November 2020	0.90
129	38	"Autodefensas en acción"	20 November 2020	0.98
130	39	"Un escondite para Fernanda"	23 November 2020	0.84
131	40	"La triple alianza secreta"	24 November 2020	0.85
132	41	"El coraje de Diego"	27 November 2020	0.87
133	42	"Encubierta"	30 November 2020	0.97
134	43	"Directo al matadero"	1 December 2020	0.87
135	44	"El siguiente golpe"	3 December 2020	N/A
136	45	"Doble rescate"	4 December 2020	0.85
137	46	"La sentencia"	7 December 2020	0.75
138	47	"La huida"	8 December 2020	0.79
139	48	"Perdón"	9 December 2020	0.88
140	49	"Rodeados"	10 December 2020	0.94
141	50	"No a la traición"	11 December 2020 (Note: This episode lasts for two hours, according to Telemundo, however it is only counted as one episode and not as two episodes.)	0.83
142	51	"Sin rastro de Salas"	14 December 2020	0.74
143	52	"72 horas"	15 December 2020	0.69
144	53	"Lavado de cerebro"	16 December 2020	0.67
145	54	"Ya se armó"	17 December 2020	0.83
146	55	"Tres por uno"	18 December 2020	0.68
147	56	"Es hora"	21 December 2020	0.79
148	57	"Las maniobras de Fernanda"	22 December 2020	0.83
149	58	"Irreconocible"	23 December 2020	0.96
150	59	"Como liebre en el bosque"	28 December 2020	N/A
151	60	"Sobre los mismos pasos"	29 December 2020	N/A
152	61	"Los demonios andan sueltos"	30 December 2020	N/A
153	62	"En carne propia"	1 January 2021	0.67
154	63	"Negocio en picada"	4 January 2021	0.81
155	64	"Tratos con la mafia"	5 January 2021	0.93
156	65	"Agallas"	6 January 2021	N/A
157	66	"Se encienden las alarmas"	7 January 2021	N/A
158	67	"La ruta hacia Victoria"	8 January 2021	0.93
159	68	"Mateo en ebullición"	11 January 2021	0.91
160	69	"Más cerca que nunca"	12 January 2021	0.89
161	70	"Van por el verdugo"	13 January 2021	0.87
162	71	"El dato"	14 January 2021	0.97
163	72	"El informante"	15 January 2021	0.97
164	73	"Todo por la familia"	18 January 2021	0.88
165	74	"Jugadas peligrosas"	19 January 2021	1.01
166	75	"El rescate"	20 January 2021	0.89
167	76	"La justicia en sus manos"	21 January 2021	0.84
168	77	"El enemigo en común"	22 January 2021	1.09
169	78	"Broche de oro"	25 January 2021	N/A

== Awards and nominations ==
Year	Award	Category	Recipient	Result	Ref.
2019	Produ Awards	Telenovela	Falsa identidad	Nominated	
