= List of Rosario Tijeras episodes =

Rosario Tijeras is a Mexican telenovela produced by Teleset for Sony Pictures Television.

As of 18 June 2025, 237 episodes of Rosario Tijeras have aired, concluding the fourth season.

== Series overview ==
Season	Episodes	Originally released		
Season	Episodes	First released	Last released	Network
1	60	30 October 2016	30 January 2017	Azteca 13
2	67	27 August 2018	16 December 2018	Azteca 7
3	70	25 August 2019	14 December 2019	Azteca 7
4	40	18 June 2025		Netflix

== Episodes ==
=== Season 1 (2016–17) ===
No. overall	No. in season	Title	Mexico air date	U.S. air date	US viewers (millions)
1	1	"Rosario le roba un beso a Antonio al conocerlo"	30 October 2016	27 June 2017	1.39
2	2	"Rosario impide que su padrastro abuse de ella"	31 October 2016	28 June 2017	1.11
3	3	"Rosario le salva la vida a El General tras sufrir un ataque respiratorio"	1 November 2016	29 June 2017	1.15
4	4	"Antonio salvó a Rosario y evitó que Cacho abusara de ella"	2 November 2016	30 June 2017	1.12
5	5	"Rosario le disparó a Cacho para evitar que abusara de ella"	3 November 2016	3 July 2017	1.06
6	6	"Rosario fue arrestada por ser parte del crimen organizado"	4 November 2016	4 July 2017	0.81
7	7	"Ruby impidió que su hija Rosario pasara una noche con El General"	7 November 2016	5 July 2017	1.06
8	8	"Rosario descubrió que Antonio es el chico a quien besó"	8 November 2016	7 July 2017	1.02
9	9	"Rosario se convirtió en la modelo sensación de una pasarela"	9 November 2016	10 July 2017	1.12
10	10	"Rosario fue golpeada y secuestrada por Cacho"	10 November 2016	11 July 2017	1.16
11	11	"Rosario no quiso confesarle a su madre que sufrió un terrible abuso"	11 November 2016	12 July 2017	1.22
12	12	"Delia fue asesinada por El General"	14 November 2016	14 July 2017	1.17
13	13	"Rosario y Antonio se salvaron de ser secuestrados por El Gringo"	15 November 2016	17 July 2017	1.10
14	14	"Antonio volvió a besar a Rosario, pero en sueños"	16 November 2016	18 July 2017	1.14
15	15	"Rosario atacó a la mamá de Antonio por acusar a Ruby de robo"	17 November 2016	19 July 2017	1.02
16	16	"Rosario sedujo a Cacho y se vengó por haber abusado de ella"	18 November 2016	21 July 2017	0.98
17	17	"El Fierro le robó un beso a Rosario"	21 November 2016	24 July 2017	1.17
18	18	"Rosario y Antonio se volvieron a besar... pero en sueños"	22 November 2016	25 July 2017	1.29
19	19	"Cristóbal le dio una golpiza a la mamá de Rosario"	23 November 2016	27 July 2017	1.19
20	20	"Rosario asesinó sin piedad a El General"	24 November 2016	28 July 2017	1.31
21	21	"Rosario logró escapar de los hombres de Gonzalo tras asesinarlo"	25 November 2016	31 July 2017	0.41
22	22	"Rosario y Emilio vivieron una noche de pasión"	28 November 2016	1 August 2017	0.39
23	23	"Rosario recuperó el celular que olvidó en el departamento de Antonio"	29 November 2016	2 August 2017	0.41
24	24	"Rosario y sus amigos lograron robar la mercancía del camión"	30 November 2016	3 August 2017	0.39
25	25	"El güero puso aprueba la lealtad de Rosario"	1 December 2016	4 August 2017	0.39
26	26	"Rosario presenció cómo un coche atropelló a su hermano Erick"	2 December 2016	7 August 2017	0.36
27	27	"Antonio tuvo intimidad con Sam pensando en Rosario"	5 December 2016	8 August 2017	0.42
28	28	"Antonio fue secuestrado por Tobías"	6 December 2016	9 August 2017	0.37
29	29	"Rosario le pidió a Sam que no lastime a Antonio"	7 December 2016	10 August 2017	0.44
30	30	"Rosario no pudo cumplir con la misión de quitarle la vida al comandante"	8 December 2016	11 August 2017	0.42
31	31	"Emilio defendió a Sam de los maltratos de Federico"	9 December 2016	14 August 2017	0.41
32	32	"Emilio y Antonio comenzaron a sospechar que Rosario es una delincuente"	12 December 2016	15 August 2017	0.45
33	33	"Federico contrató a El Fierro para asesinar a Antonio"	13 December 2016	16 August 2017	0.46
34	34	"Sam le robó un beso a Antonio"	14 December 2016	17 August 2017	0.41
35	35	"Antonio y Emilio se pelearon salvajemente por Rosario"	15 December 2016	18 August 2017	0.47
36	36	"Antonio está muy cerca de ser asesinado por El Fierro"	16 December 2016	21 August 2017	0.49
37	37	"Antonio vivió una noche de pasión con Rosario al confesarle su amor"	19 December 2016	24 August 2017	0.38
38	38	"Antonio le confesó a Emilio que está enamorado de Rosario"	20 December 2016	25 August 2017	0.46
39	39	"Rosario está muy cerca de ser asesinada por Cacho"	21 December 2016	28 August 2017	0.36
40	40	"Brandon y El Fierro salvaron a Rosario de morir y asesinaron a Cacho"	22 December 2016	29 August 2017	0.37
41	41	"Antonio le juró a Sam que jamás podrá amarla como a Rosario"	3 January 2017	30 August 2017	0.38
42	42	"Paula descubrió que Emilio le es infiel con Rosario"	4 January 2017	31 August 2017	0.38
43	43	"Rosario le reclamó a Emilio por ocultarle su boda con Paula"	5 January 2017	1 September 2017	0.44
44	44	"El Fierro recibió la orden de asesinar a Rosario"	6 January 2017	4 September 2017	0.45
45	45	"Rosario interrumpió la boda de Emilio y lo secuestró"	9 January 2017	5 September 2017	0.50
46	46	"Rosario descubrió que Emilio la abandonó para volver con su esposa"	10 January 2017	6 September 2017	0.42
47	47	"El Fierro hirió de muerte a Rosario"	11 January 2017	7 September 2017	0.49
48	48	"Emilio le pidió a Rosario que luche por su vida"	12 January 2017	8 September 2017	0.40
49	49	"El Fierro y Brandon salvaron a Rosario de ser asesinada en un hospital"	13 January 2017	11 September 2017	0.65
50	50	"Querubín descubrió el escondite de Rosario"	16 January 2017	12 September 2017	0.47
51	51	"Rosario le reprochó a Fierro con llanto su traición"	17 January 2017	13 September 2017	0.57
52	52	"El Fierro enfrentó a Tobías para vengar a Rosario"	18 January 2017	14 September 2017	0.60
53	53	"Brandon arriesgó su vida por salvar a Rosario de una emboscada"	19 January 2017	15 September 2017	0.48
54	54	"Rosario lloró desconsoladamente al descubrir que perdió a su bebé"	20 January 2017	18 September 2017	0.53
55	55	"Rosario saca a Antonio de la cárcel"	23 January 2017	19 September 2017	0.47
56	56	"Brandon fue asesinado al salvar las vidas de su madre y hermano"	24 January 2017	20 September 2017	0.56
57	57	"Entre lágrimas Rosario le juró a Brandon vengar su muerte"	25 January 2017	21 September 2017	0.57
58	58	"Peludo atacó a Rosario en el funeral de Brandon"	26 January 2017	22 September 2017	0.65
59	59	"Rosario quemó toda la fortuna de Tobías"	27 January 2017	24 September 2017	0.68
60	60	"Rosario asesinó a Tobías para vengar las muertes de Emilio, Brandon y El Fierro"	30 January 2017	24 September 2017	0.68

=== Season 2 (2018) ===
No. overall	No. in season	Title	Mexico air date	U.S. air date	Mexico viewers (millions)	U.S. viewers (millions)
61	1	"Rosario y Antonio logran escapar de Arteaga"	27 August 2018	7 January 2019	2.7	0.33
62	2	"Rosario se encuentra raptada"	28 August 2018	8 January 2019	2.5	0.26
63	3	"A tijerazos, Rosario lo vuelve hacer"	29 August 2018	9 January 2019	2.3	0.32
64	4	"Rosario se escapa de la hacienda"	30 August 2018	10 January 2019	2.4	0.24
65	5	"Rosario y El Ángel frente a frente"	3 September 2018	11 January 2019	2.0	0.30
66	6	"Arteaga le declara la guerra a Rosario"	4 September 2018	14 January 2019	2.3	0.27
67	7	"Rosario va en busca de Antonio"	5 September 2018	15 January 2019	2.3	0.29
68	8	"Tania defiende a Rosario"	6 September 2018	16 January 2019	2.5	0.40
69	9	"Toxina lesiona a Rosario"	10 September 2018	17 January 2019	2.0	0.35
70	10	"Toxina acaba con la vida de Ruby"	11 September 2018	18 January 2019	1.7	0.35
71	11	"Rosario pacta con El Ángel"	12 September 2018	21 January 2019	1.9	0.31
72	12	"Arteaga no perdona"	13 September 2018	22 January 2019	2.0	0.32
73	13	"Antonio logra escapar de Toxina"	17 September 2018	23 January 2019	1.9	0.39
74	14	"Rosario ya está en casa de El Ángel"	18 September 2018	24 January 2019	1.9	0.32
75	15	"Paula está en graves problemas"	19 September 2018	25 January 2019	1.8	0.36
76	16	"Rosario le perdona la vida a Luis Enrique"	20 September 2018	28 January 2019	1.9	0.27
77	17	"Antonio se reencuentra con sus papás"	24 September 2018	29 January 2019	1.8	0.30
78	18	"Rosario y El Ángel se besan apasionadamente"	25 September 2018	30 January 2019	2.0	0.32
79	19	"Rosario no se deja seducir"	26 September 2018	31 January 2019	2.0	0.34
80	20	"Antonio y Paula lo vuelven hacer"	27 September 2018	1 February 2019	1.1	0.32
81	21	"Paula enfrenta a Rosario y le dice que no vale la pena que busque a Antonio"	1 October 2018	4 February 2019	2.0	0.34
82	22	"Rosario tiene su primera misión y las cosas no están saliendo bien"	2 October 2018	5 February 2019	1.9	0.35
83	23	"Rosario pone en marcha el plan contra Andrews y logra sacar información de su ordenador"	3 October 2018	6 February 2019	1.9	0.34
84	24	"Rosario se mete a la boca del lobo"	4 October 2018	7 February 2019	1.7	0.35
85	25	"Rosario ejecuta a Aquiles con una llave mortal"	8 October 2018	8 February 2019	2.0	0.35
86	26	"Rosario logra saltar de la avioneta con ayuda de Jonás"	9 October 2018	11 February 2019	2.0	0.30
87	27	"Rosario se dejó besar por El Ángel"	10 October 2018	12 February 2019	1.8	0.30
88	28	"Rosario y Antonio vuelven a estar juntos"	11 October 2018	13 February 2019	2.1	0.32
89	29	"Rosario y El Ángel pasan la noche juntos"	15 October 2018	14 February 2019	1.7	0.33
90	30	"El plan de El Ángel rindió sus primeros frutos, la agente Pulido cree que Rosario está muerta"	16 October 2018	15 February 2019	1.7	0.32
91	31	"Antonio firma su sentencia de muerte"	17 October 2018	18 February 2019	1.8	0.27
92	32	"Arteaga llora la falsa muerte de Rosario Tijeras, pide que le hagan un funeral a su altura"	18 October 2018	19 February 2019	1.7	0.31
93	33	"Rosario le confiesa a El Ángel que perdió un bebé"	22 October 2018	20 February 2019	1.6	0.30
94	34	"Ardilla es descubierto por Toxina y Arteaga no le perdona la vida"	23 October 2018	21 February 2019	1.6	0.30
95	35	"Las pesadillas de Rosario dan con su papá"	24 October 2018	22 February 2019	1.7	0.33
96	36	"Rosario se arrepiente de explotar la bomba en el laboratorio de Arteaga"	25 October 2018	25 February 2019	1.7	0.28
97	37	"Arteaga da un duro golpe a El Ángel"	29 October 2018	26 February 2019	1.6	0.33
98	38	"Genaro casi pierde la vida por culpa de Erick"	30 October 2018	27 February 2019	1.8	0.29
99	39	"Rosario ejecuta a Doña Úrsula y termina con la primera parte de la misión"	31 October 2018	28 February 2019	N/A	0.27
100	40	"Rosario y El Ángel rescatan al hijo de Melba tras la explosión del laboratorio de Arteaga"	1 November 2018	1 March 2019	1.5	0.33
101	41	"El agente Medina sigue la investigación sobre una presunta hija que tiene Arteaga"	5 November 2018	4 March 2019	1.6	0.29
102	42	"Antonio sale de la cárcel"	6 November 2018	5 March 2019	1.7	0.31
103	43	"Tania se hará pasar como hija de Arteaga para vengar la muerte de Rubí"	7 November 2018	6 March 2019	1.8	0.32
104	44	"Andrómeda fracasó en su intento por encontrar alguna pista de su amiga"	8 November 2018	7 March 2019	1.6	0.30
105	45	"Rosario le negó un beso a Antonio, su corazón ya está con el Ángel"	12 November 2018	8 March 2019	1.5	0.33
106	46	"Paula sorprende a Rosario y Antonio en su departamento"	13 November 2018	11 March 2019	1.6	0.34
107	47	"Arteaga y El Ángel frente a frente"	14 November 2018	12 March 2019	1.8	0.33
108	48	"El Ángel sobrevivió al ataque de Arteaga pero se encuentra malherido"	15 November 2018	13 March 2019	1.7	0.32
109	49	"Rosario y El Ángel empiezan una relación formal"	19 November 2018	14 March 2019	1.5	0.27
110	50	"Alberto descubrió toda la verdad sobre su amiga Alexandra"	20 November 2018	15 March 2019	1.5	0.33
111	51	"Guarro descubre que Jonás es el infiltrado de El Ángel"	21 November 2018	18 March 2019	1.7	0.31
112	52	"Antonio se mete a la boca del lobo"	22 November 2018	19 March 2019	1.7	0.32
113	53	"Aurora llega al rescate de Rosario"	26 November 2018	20 March 2019	1.6	0.33
114	54	"Antonio descubre el laboratorio de El Ángel pero es recibido con plomo"	27 November 2018	21 March 2019	1.6	0.25
115	55	"La agente Pulido es reintegrada a la corporación y será la comandante responsable de capturar a Rosario"	28 November 2018	25 March 2019	1.5	0.28
116	56	"Toxina y sus hombres no tienen piedad, a quemarropa terminan con la vida Melba y Genaro"	29 November 2018	27 March 2019	1.6	0.34
117	57	"Antonio tiene la prueba para hundir a El Ángel"	3 December 2018	28 March 2019	1.8	0.32
118	58	"Rosario se siente traicionada por El Ángel"	4 December 2018	29 March 2019	1.8	0.34
119	59	"La comandante Pulido confirma que Guarro es el infiltrado de Arteaga"	5 December 2018	1 April 2019	1.8	0.36
120	60	"Erick fue capturado por Toxina"	6 December 2018	2 April 2019	1.6	0.39
121	61	"Rosario y Arteaga logran escapar del operativo sorpresa que organizó la comandante Pulido"	10 December 2018	3 April 2019	1.8	0.35
122	62	"Antonio regresó a los brazos de Rosario"	11 December 2018	4 April 2019	1.5	0.29
123	63	"Arteaga le da un duro golpe al puerco policíaco"	12 December 2018	5 April 2019	1.8	0.30
124	64	"El Ángel sorprende a Rosario y a Antonio justo cuando salían con la mercancía robada"	13 December 2018	8 April 2019	2.2	0.35
125	65	"Aurora ejecuta por la espalda a Antonio"	16 December 2018	9 April 2019	2.6	0.34 0.27 0.40
126	66	"El Mini Pig le dispara a Arteaga"	16 December 2018	10 April 2019	2.6	0.34 0.27 0.40
127	67	"Rosario y Arteaga son capturados"	16 December 2018	11 April 2019	2.6	0.34 0.27 0.40

=== Season 3 (2019) ===
No. overall	No. in season	Title	Original release date	Mexico viewers (millions)
128	1	"El Ángel fracasa en su intento por rescatar a Rosario de la cárcel"	25 August 2019	1.9
129	2	"La hija de Rosario es secuestrada por una falsa enfermera"	25 August 2019	1.9
130	3	"La unidad de inteligencia le propone el indulto a Rosario Tijeras"	25 August 2019	1.9
131	4	"Daniel Salgado "El Ángel", firma su matrimonio a cambio de muchos millones de dólares"	26 August 2019	1.9
132	5	"Rosario le confiesa a El Ángel que es el padre de su hija"	27 August 2019	2.0
133	6	"Rosario logra intercambiar el cargamento sin un solo disparo"	28 August 2019	1.8
134	7	"Rosario se reencuentra con Erick"	29 August 2019	2.2
135	8	"El Ángel obtiene la ruta de la Gringa, rompió los códigos del negocio"	2 September 2019	1.8
136	9	"Dylan empieza a negociar con la Calaca, principal operador de El Ángel"	3 September 2019	1.8
137	10	"Rosario ejecuta al principal operador de El Ángel"	4 September 2019	1.8
138	11	"Rosario y El Ángel pasan la noche juntos"	5 September 2019	1.6
139	12	"Operativo sorpresa contra Rosario"	9 September 2019	1.6
140	13	"Pamela se infiltra como Escort"	10 September 2019	1.3
141	14	"Dylan confirma que Vanesa tiene una relación cercana con Aurora"	11 September 2019	1.8
142	15	"Dylan logra defenderse de un ataque mortal de El Ángel"	12 September 2019	1.5
143	16	"Dylan recibe un disparo"	16 September 2019	1.7
144	17	"Dylan quiere recuperar su felicidad pero no con Rosario"	17 September 2019	1.6
145	18	"Erick le confirma a Rosario que Aurora traicionó a El Ángel, y es la responsable del secuestro de Ruby"	18 September 2019	1.7
146	19	"El Ángel rompe relaciones con Rosario"	19 September 2019	1.5
147	20	"Dylan logra obtener una entrevista con Don Pacho"	23 September 2019	1.4
148	21	"Aurora vuelve a filtrar información"	24 September 2019	1.4
149	22	"Rosario frente a frente con Aurora"	25 September 2019	1.6
150	23	"Fuego cruzado, Rosario es capturada en casa de Don Pacho"	26 September 2019	1.6
151	24	"El operativo contra Don Pacho fue todo un éxito, va tras las rejas"	30 September 2019	1.6
152	25	"El Teniente Bravo catea la empresa y la casa de Laura Peralta"	1 October 2019	1.5
153	26	"El Ángel le da una lección a Erick por robarle dinero de la venta de su mercancía"	2 October 2019	N/A
154	27	"El Ángel confirma que Dylan es un infiltrado de la policía"	3 October 2019	1.4
155	28	"Dylan finge su muerte con ayuda de Rosario"	7 October 2019	1.4
156	29	"Rosario se entrega a Dylan"	8 October 2019	1.5
157	30	"Laura Peralta consigue la ruta para transportar la mercancía de Daniel Salgado"	9 October 2019	1.4
158	31	"El General Iriarte está detrás del secuestro de Ruby"	10 October 2019	1.5
159	32	"Rosario logró conseguir información sobre el paradero de Ruby"	14 October 2019	1.5
160	33	"Rosario entra en razón y sospecha que la policía está detrás del secuestro de su hija"	15 October 2019	1.4
161	34	"La Agente Pamela llega al rescate de Dylan"	16 October 2019	1.4
162	35	"Toxina está de regreso"	17 October 2019	1.3
163	36	"Géminis ejecuta al papá de Rosario"	21 October 2019	1.5
164	37	"Laura y Erick logran escapar del operativo sorpresa del Teniente Bravo"	22 October 2019	1.3
165	38	"El Ángel confirma que Aurora fue la responsable del operativo que implementó el Teniente Bravo"	23 October 2019	1.5
166	39	"Rosario venga la muerte de Antonio"	24 October 2019	1.5
167	40	"Toxina frente a frente con Rosario"	28 October 2019	1.2
168	41	"El Ángel llega al rescate de Chayo"	29 October 2019	1.5
169	42	"Rubí, Rosario y El Ángel por fin se reúnen"	30 October 2019	N/A
170	43	"Para salvar a su hija y a Rosario, El Ángel toma una dirección contraria a ellas y se pone a merced de la policía"	31 October 2019	1.5
171	44	"El Ángel se entrega a la justicia"	4 November 2019	1.5
172	45	"Mientras El Ángel está tras las rejas, Rosario y Erick comienzan a planear cómo rescatarlo además de planear cómo poner a salvo a Rubí"	5 November 2019	1.5
173	46	"Verdugo llega a la cárcel para seguir defendiendo a "El Ángel" y encuentran una ruta de escape"	6 November 2019	1.4
174	47	"Rosario busca a Dylan para despedirse"	7 November 2019	1.6
175	48	"Rosario estaba a punto de salir del país, pero regresa después de que Laura le pide apoyo para El Ángel"	11 November 2019	1.4
176	49	"Rosario y Laura trabajan de la mano para armar el plan para salvar a El Ángel"	12 November 2019	1.6
177	50	"La policía le quita a El Ángel el celular que tenía escondido"	13 November 2019	1.5
178	51	"¡Intento fallido! Dylan arruinó el intento de rescate de El Ángel y Rosario fue capturada"	14 November 2019	1.7
179	52	"Rosario logra escapar de Dylan, pero El Ángel es encerrado en la celda más severa del penal"	18 November 2019	1.6
180	53	"Rosario regresa a la cárcel"	19 November 2019	1.4
181	54	"La DEA llegó por El Ángel pero Rosario está cada vez más cerca de poder salvar a El Ángel"	20 November 2019	1.6
182	55	"Rosario salva a El Ángel"	21 November 2019	1.7
183	56	"Escapar no será fácil"	25 November 2019	1.6
184	57	"Rosario y El Ángel logran escapar de la cárcel"	26 November 2019	1.7
185	58	"El Ángel quiere rehacer su vida con Rosario pero ella sólo quiere aceptar si se aleja de la delincuencia"	27 November 2019	0.95
186	59	"Rosario escapa de nuevo"	28 November 2019	1.6
187	60	"Toxina captura a Rosario y es entregada al General Iriarte"	2 December 2019	1.6
188	61	"Dylan sabotea la conferencia del General Iriarte"	3 December 2019	1.6
189	62	"Iriarte le confiesa a Martina que es el responsable del secuestro de la hija de Rosario Tijeras"	4 December 2019	1.7
190	63	"El General Iriarte es declarado culpable y sentenciado a 92 años de prisión"	5 December 2019	2.0
191	64	"El Ángel y Rosario unen fuerza para acabar con el General Iriarte"	8 December 2019	1.2
192	65	"La sangre se paga con sangre"	9 December 2019	1.1
193	66	"Rosario asume todos los riesgos y va al rescate de Daniel Salgado"	10 December 2019	1.8
194	67	"Rosario y El Ángel van por Laura Peralta"	11 December 2019	1.5
195	68	"El Ángel se convierte en el mismo diablo"	12 December 2019	1.9
196	69	"El Ángel secuestra a la hija de Iriarte para negociar la libertad de su hija Rubí"	14 December 2019	2.3
197	70	"Rosario sacrifica su vida"	14 December 2019	2.3

=== Season 4 (2025) ===
No. overall	No. in season	Title	Original release date	Azteca Uno air date	Mexico linear viewers (millions)
198	1	"Episode 1"	18 June 2025	18 August 2025	1.53
199	2	"Episode 2"	18 June 2025	19 August 2025	1.39
200	3	"Episode 3"	18 June 2025	20 August 2025	1.44
201	4	"Episode 4"	18 June 2025	21 August 2025	1.55
202	5	"Episode 5"	18 June 2025	22 August 2025	1.15
203	6	"Episode 6"	18 June 2025	25 August 2025	1.27
204	7	"Episode 7"	18 June 2025	26 August 2025	1.37
205	8	"Episode 8"	18 June 2025	27 August 2025	1.54
206	9	"Episode 9"	18 June 2025	28 August 2025	1.35
207	10	"Episode 10"	18 June 2025	29 August 2025	1.41
208	11	"Episode 11"	18 June 2025	1 September 2025	N/A
209	12	"Episode 12"	18 June 2025	2 September 2025	N/A
210	13	"Episode 13"	18 June 2025	3 September 2025	N/A
211	14	"Episode 14"	18 June 2025	4 September 2025	N/A
212	15	"Episode 15"	18 June 2025	5 September 2025	N/A
213	16	"Episode 16"	18 June 2025	8 September 2025	N/A
214	17	"Episode 17"	18 June 2025	9 September 2025	N/A
215	18	"Episode 18"	18 June 2025	10 September 2025	N/A
216	19	"Episode 19"	18 June 2025	11 September 2025	N/A
217	20	"Episode 20"	18 June 2025	12 September 2025	N/A
218	21	"Episode 21"	18 June 2025	15 September 2025	N/A
219	22	"Episode 22"	18 June 2025	16 September 2025	N/A
220	23	"Episode 23"	18 June 2025	17 September 2025	N/A
221	24	"Episode 24"	18 June 2025	18 September 2025	N/A
222	25	"Episode 25"	18 June 2025	19 September 2025	N/A
223	26	"Episode 26"	18 June 2025	22 September 2025	N/A
224	27	"Episode 27"	18 June 2025	23 September 2025	N/A
225	28	"Episode 28"	18 June 2025	24 September 2025	N/A
226	29	"Episode 29"	18 June 2025	25 September 2025	N/A
227	30	"Episode 30"	18 June 2025	26 September 2025	N/A
228	31	"Episode 31"	18 June 2025	29 September 2025	N/A
229	32	"Episode 32"	18 June 2025	30 September 2025	N/A
230	33	"Episode 33"	18 June 2025	1 October 2025	N/A
231	34	"Episode 34"	18 June 2025	2 October 2025	N/A
232	35	"Episode 35"	18 June 2025	3 October 2025	N/A
233	36	"Episode 36"	18 June 2025	6 October 2025	N/A
234	37	"Episode 37"	18 June 2025	7 October 2025	N/A
235	38	"Episode 38"	18 June 2025	8 October 2025	N/A
236	39	"Episode 39"	18 June 2025	7 October 2025	N/A
237	40	"Episode 40"	18 June 2025	8 October 2025	N/A
