= Alonso Espeleta =

Mexican actor (born 1988)

- Born: Alonso Espeleta Corral; July 26, 1988 (age 36); Durango, Mexico
- Occupation: Actor

Alonso Espeleta (born Alonso Espeleta Corral on July 26, 1988, in Durango) is a Mexican actor. He's best known for the role of "Luis Mercenario" in Telemundo's telenovela, Pecados Ajenos.

== TV shows ==
- Rosario Tijeras (2016 telenovela) – Chavez
- El Dandy (TV series) (2015) – Huesos
- Amor Cautivo (2012) – Diego del Valle
- Cielo Rojo (2011) – Andres Renteria – Young Andres
- Secretos del Alma (2008–2009) – Nico
- Pecados Ajenos (2007–2008) – Luis Mercenario
