= UEPA! Un escenario para amar =

Mexican telenovela

- Genre: Telenovela
- Created by: Alejandra Urdiaín
- Based on: Como en el cine by Verónica Suárez
- Written by: Natalia Núñez; Mildret Pérez; Pilar Obon
- Directed by: Rafael Gutiérrez
- Starring: Gloria Stalina; Erick Chapa; Betty Monroe; Martha Mariana Castro
- Theme music composer: Armando Ávila; Marcela de la Garza; Rotger Rosas
- Opening theme: "Química en común" by CD9
- Country of origin: Mexico
- Original language: Spanish
- No. of seasons: 1
- No. of episodes: 141

Production
- Executive producer: Rafael Gutiérrez
- Producers: Elisa Salinas; Pedro Luévano; Pedro Lira
- Cinematography: Sergio Treviño; Carlos Ruiz Torres
- Editors: Alejandra Espinoza; Fernando Rodríguez; Lorenzo Guerra
- Camera setup: Multi-camera
- Production company: TV Azteca

Original release
- Network: Azteca Trece
- Release: 27 April – 5 June 2015

UEPA! Un escenario para amar, is a Mexican telenovela produced by Azteca in 2014–15. It is a remake of telenovela Como en el cine produced in 2001.

== Synopsis ==
UEPA! Un escenario para amar portrays a young woman who must live a double life to be able to take care of her younger sister.

== Cast ==
- Gloria Stalina as Lourdes "Lule" Jordán
- Erick Chapa as Claudio / Franco
- Betty Monroe as Zoila Lezama
- Martha Mariana Castro as Martha Mariana Castro
- Thali García as July Rivero
- Ana Belena as Alexandra Williams
- Regina Payes as Anya Padrón
- Lourdes Narro as Rada
- Carmen Baqué as Dolores
- Nubia Martí as Luna
- Humberto Bua as Jorge
- Christian Vázquez as Moisés "Moy" Lezama
- Ramiro Fumazoni as Padre de Claudio
- Anette Michel as Madre de Lourdes
- Martín Altomaro as Poncho
- Jessica Roteache as Teresita
- Cecilia Constantino as Hermana Fausta
- Lourdes Narro as Rada
- Patrick Fernández as Omar
- Marcela Alcaraz as Carolina
- Alexa Martin as Marisel de los Arcos
- Marco Aurelio Nava as Greco
- Andy Chavez de Moore as Angélica
- Elsa Ortíz as Tamara
- Gerardo Acuña as Sergio Williams
- Ariana Ron as Bianca "La Pantera" Campestre
- Gala Montes as Young Lourdes "Lule" Jordán
- Tatiana del Real as Estefani Jordán
- Guillermo Iván as Aldo
- Patrick Fernández as Omar
- Valeria Galaviz as Rox
- Cristóbal Orellana as Saúl Torres
- Camila Rojas as Gabriela "Gaby" Ruíz

== Soundtrack ==
Track	Song
1	"Química en común" by CD9
2	"Marry You" by Bruno Mars
