= Antonio Gaona (actor) =

Mexican actor

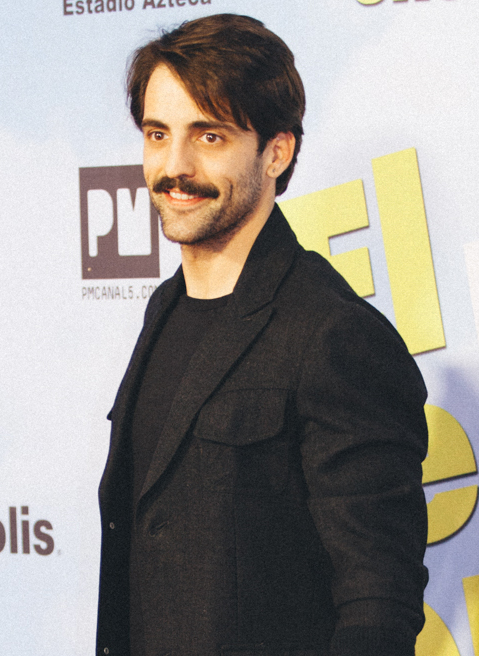
- Gaona at the 2017 premiere of the Mexican film El que busca encuentra
- Born: 19 April 1982 (age 43); Mexico City, Mexico
- Occupation: Actor
- Years active: 2003–present

Antonio Gaona (born 19 April 1982) is a Mexican actor, best known for his role of Emilio Echegaray in the TV Azteca's crime drama series Rosario Tijeras (2016–2017).

== Early life ==
Gaona was born on 19 April 1982 in Mexico City, Mexico. He is a graduate of the CasAzul School of Performing Arts.

== Filmography ==
=== Film roles ===
Year	Title	Roles	Notes
2006	Cansada de besar sapos	Tizoc	
2006	La novia del mar	Benjamín's friend	
2006	Morirse en domingo	Pedro	
2007	El último justo	David	
2008	Kada kien su karma	Julián	
2009	Amar a morir	Paco	
2009	La última y nos vamos	The Eggscratcher	
2010	Sin ella	Julio	
2010	180º	Paxi	
2010	Hidalgo: La historia jamás contada	Lope	
2012	Morelos	Guadalupe Victoria	
2013	31 días	Pato	
2015	Los títeres de Belial	The Chaser	
2015	El cumple de la abuela	Juan Pablo	
2019	Mentada de padre	Abel	
2019	La boda de la abuela	Juan Pablo	
2023	¿Cómo matar a mamá?	Fabián	

=== Television roles ===
Year	Title	Roles	Notes
2016	Eva la Trailera	Andrés "Andy" Palacios	Main role
2016	Rosario Tijeras	Emilio Echegaray	Main role (season 1)
2026	Polen	Andrés	
