= Erick Chapa =

Mexican television actor

- Born: July 5, 1985 (age 41); Mexico City, Mexico
- Years active: 2008–present
- Spouse: Alexa Martín (m. 2017)
- Children: 2

Erick Chapa (born July 5, 1985 in Mexico City, Mexico), is a Mexican television actor.

== Personal life ==
He is married with the Mexican actress Alexa Martín, the wedding ceremony was held on 3 February 2017 at Hacienda La Escoba, in Jalisco. They both became parents on 25 October 2019, when their first child, whom they called Lorenzo, was born.

== Filmography ==
Year	Title	Role	Notes
2008	Cambio de vida		"Cuestiones de peso" (Season 1, Episode 56)
2009	Cada quien su santo		Episode: "A contra reloj"
2009	Mujer comprada	Alfonso Díaz	
2010	Prófugas del destino	Pablo García	
2011	Emperatriz	David	
2012	Amor cautivo	Marcelo Bustamante Arizmendi	
2013	Destino	Iñaki Herrera	Co-lead role
2014	Siempre tuya Acapulco	Rodrigo Rivas Santander	
2015	UEPA! Un escenario para amar	Claudio de los Arcos / Franco	Lead role
2025	Cautiva por amor	Fernando Fuentes Mansilla	
2026	Doc	Dr. David Valadares	
