= Sebastián Martínez (actor) =

Colombian actor

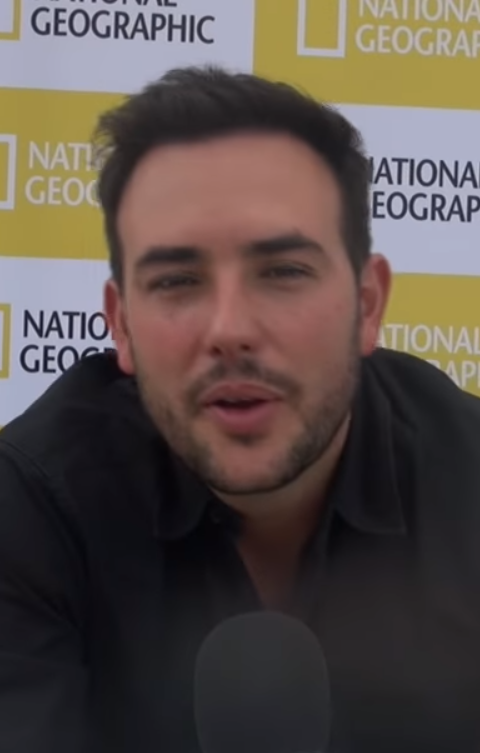
- Martínez in 2017
- Born: Sebastián Martínez; January 7, 1983 (age 43); Medellín, Colombia
- Occupation: Actor
- Years active: 2000-present

Sebastián Martínez (born as Sebastián Martínez on January 7, 1983, in Medellín, Colombia), is a Colombian actor.

== Filmography ==
=== Films ===
Year	Title	Role	Notes
2013	The Damned	Ramon	Debut film; previously titled Gallow's Hill

=== Television ===
Year	Title	Role	Notes
2000	Padres e hijos	Santiago Gallego Sánchez	
2003	Ángel de la guarda, mi dulce compañía	John F. Kennedy "Kenny" Perales	
2004	La viuda de la mafia	Elkin Montes	
2005	Juegos prohibidos	Ignacio "Nacho" Bueno	Lead role
2005–06	Hospital Central	Edi, chico colombiano	"Amor de reina" (Season 10, Episode 9) "Si amanece por fin" (Season 12, Episode 13)
2006	Mujeres		1 episode
2008	Sin retorno	Marcelo	"Tacones" (Season 1, Episode 7)
2009	El penúltimo beso	Manolo Izquierdo Preciado	
2010	Los caballeros las prefieren brutas	Kenny Paulsen	"Juego de niños" (Season 1, Episode 12)
2010	Rosario Tijeras	Emilio Echegaray	
2010–11	La Pola	Jorge Tadeo Lozano	85 episodes
2012	Allá te espero	Alex Montoya	Lead role
2014	El Estilista	Cap. Esteban Avila	
2016	La ley del corazón	Camilo Borrero	
2017	La querida del Centauro	Juan Fernando Rodríguez "El Primo"	
2018	La bella y las bestias	Antonio José Ramos (El Colombiano)	26 Episodes
2018–present	Rosario Tijeras	Daniel Salgado "El Ángel"	Main role (seasons 2-3; 5); Guest star (season 4)
2020	Pa' quererte	Mauricio Reina	Main role
2022–2023	Pálpito	Zacarías Cienfuegos	Main role
2024	Accidente	Emiliano Lobo	Main role
2026	Pa' seguirte queriendo	Mauricio Reina	Main role

== Awards and nominations ==
Year	Award	Category	Nominated	Result
2002	TvyNovelas Colombia Awards	Best Revelation Actor	Padres e hijos	Nominated
2005	TvyNovelas Colombia Awards	Best Revelation Actor	La viuda de la mafia	Won
2006	India Catalina Awards	Best Leading Actor in a Telenovela	Juegos prohibidos	Nominated
