= List of Mexican films of 2025 =

A list of Mexican-produced and co-produced feature films released or scheduled for release in Mexico in 2025. When applicable, the domestic theatrical release date is favoured.

== Films ==
Release		Title (Domestic title)	Cast & Crew	Distributor	Ref.
J A N U A R Y	9	Corina	Director: Urzula Barba Cast: Naian González Norvind, Cristo Fernández	Cinépolis Distribución	
J A N U A R Y	16	Gift Table (Mesa de regalos)	Director: Noé Santillán-López Cast: Cassandra Sánchez Navarro, José Eduardo Derbez, Verónica Bravo, Gustavo Egelhaaf, Ariel López Padilla, Daniel Tovar, Irán Castillo	Star Distribution	
J A N U A R Y	30	Déjame estar contigo	Director: Isaac Cherem Cast: Johanna Murillo, Andrea Sutton, Aksel Gómez, Silvia Navarro	Videocine	
J A N U A R Y	30	Rain (Lluvia)	Director: Rodrigo García Sáiz Cast: Bruno Bichir, Cecilia Suárez, Arcelia Ramírez, Martha Claudia Moreno, Mauricio Isaac, Kristyan Ferrer, Mayuko Nihei, Esteban Caicedo, Dolores Heredia, Morganna Love	Pimienta Films	
J A N U A R Y	31	Lucca's World (Los dos hemisferios de Lucca)	Director: Mariana Chenillo Cast: Bárbara Mori, Julián Tello, Juan Pablo Medina, Ari Brickman, Danish Huasain, Samuel Pérez, Paloma Alvamar, Abhinav Grover, Hernán Mendoza	Netflix	
F E B R U A R Y	7	With You in the Future (Contigo en el futuro)	Roberto Girault (director); Michel Brown, Sandra Echeverría	Amazon Prime Video	
F E B R U A R Y	27	Winner Takes the Cake (¡Qué huevos, Sofía!)	Director: Carlos Santos Cast: Giovanna Romo, Sergio Mayer, Liliana Arriaga, Yanet García, Priscila Arias, Ricardo Peralta	Cinépolis Distribución	̣
F E B R U A R Y	28	Counterstrike (Contraataque)	Director: Chava Cartas Cast: Luis Alberti, Noe Hernandez, Leonardo Alonso, Luis Curiel, David Leon and Guillermo Nava	Netflix	
M A R C H	18	1938: When Mexico Recovered Its Oil (1938: Cuando el petróleo fue nuestro)	Director: Sergio Olhovich Cast: Ianis Guerrero, Ofelia Medina, Karen Martí, Baltimore Beltrán, Roberto Beck, Julian Sedgwick, Jon Roberts, María Penella Gómez, Viridiana Robles, Salvador Sánchez, Esteban Soberanes, Raúl Briones, Fermín Martínez, Mauro González, Dave Collins, Israel Almanza, Salvador Alvarez, Raúl Barranco, Steven Destello, Nelly González, Héctor Holten, Elena Gore	Corazón Films	
M A R C H	20	Dead Man's Switch (Arillo de hombre muerto)	Director: Alejandro Gerber Bicecci Cast: Adriana Paz, Noé Hernández, Gina Morett, Gabo Anguiano	Mantícora Distribución	
M A R C H	27	Total Loss (Pérdida total)	Director: Enrique Begné Cast: Leonardo Ortizgris, Héctor Kotsifakis, Jorge A. Jiménez, Tato Alexander, Joaquín Cosio	Mantícora Distribución	
A P R I L	17	Loco por ella	Director: Rodrigo Nava Cast: Diego Klein, Minnie West	Videocine	
A P R I L	30	A Fishermen’s Tale (Un cuento de pescadores)	Director: Edgar Nito Cast: Noé Hernández, Hoze Meléndez, Mercedes Hernández, Andrés Delgado, Jorge A. Jiménez, Renata Vaca	Cinépolis Distribución	
M A Y	8	Mamá reinventada	Director: Bonnie Cartas Cast: Erika Buenfil, Michelle Renaud, Nicolasa Ortiz Monasterio, Hernán Mendoza, Arianny Tenorio, Paulina Burrola, Mikael Lacko, Javier Ponce	Videocine	
M A Y	15	Cracked (La falla)	Director: Alana Simões Cast: Celeste Limón, Iker Ortega, Mateo Camarena, Sarahí González, Karol Jiménez, Brandon Rivas, Kanon Gutiérrez	FiGa Films	
J U N E	12	The Starter (El arranque)	Director: Federico Jacobi Cast: Gabriel Lenn, Miguel Ferreria, Fabio Herrera	Benuca Films	
J U N E	19	The Muleteer (La arriera)	Director: Isabel Cristina Fregoso Cast: Andrea Aldana, Luis Vegas, Ale Cosío, Damayanti Quintanar, Christian Ramos, Mayra Batalla, Waldo Facco, Baltimore Beltrán, Guadalupe Gutiérrez Batista, Sasha González	—N/a	
J U L Y	10	Concerto for Other Hands (Concierto para otras manos)	Director: Ernesto González Díaz Cast: David González Ladrón de Guevara, José Luis González Moya	Benuca Films	
J U L Y	17	Firedream (Lumbrensueño)	Director: José Pablo Escamilla Cast: Diego Solís, Imix Lamak, Teresita Sánchez, Francisco Barreiro, Nahid Lugo, Amaresh V. Narro	Pimienta Films	
J U L Y	17	Good Savage (Buen Salvaje)	Director: Santiago Mohar Volkow Cast: Manuel Garcia-Rulfo, Naian Gonzalez Norvid, Darío Yaxbek Vernal, Andrew Leland Rogers, Alejandro Edda, Aldo Escalante Ochoa	Corazón Films	
J U L Y	24	The Invisible Frontier (La frontera invisible)	Director: Mariana Flores Villalba	Mandarina Cine	
J U L Y	24	The Weavers' Songs (Hilando sones)	Director: Ismael Vásquez Bernabé	Artegios Distribución	
J U L Y	24	We Shall Not Be Moved (No nos moverán)	Director: Pierre Saint-Martin Castellanos Cast: Luisa Huertas, Rebeca Manríquez, Pedro Hernández	Pimienta Films	
A U G U S T	7	Impostor(es)	Director: Rocko D. Marquez Flores	CNMG Distribución	
A U G U S T	14	Mirreyes contra Godínez: Las Vegas	Director: Chava Cartas Cast: Regina Blandón, Daniel Tovar, Diana Bovio, Michelle Rodríguez, Christian Vázquez, Alejandro de Marino, Roberto Aguire, Gloria Stalina	Videocine	
A U G U S T	28	The Perfect Club (El club perfecto)	Director: Ricardo Castro Velazquez Cast: Ana Layevska, Alfonso Borbolla, Liz Gallardo, Hernán del Riego, Aldo Escalante, Xavier García, Rodrigo Munguía, Gabriel Fritsch, Daniela Martínez, Andrea Tova, Diego Peniche, Miguel Orlando, Dei Saldaña, Jorge Reyes, Regina Carrillo, Gabriel Ulloa, Selene Gottdiner	Cinemex Distribución	
A U G U S T	28	Ways to Traverse a Territory (Formas de atravesar un territorio)	Director: Gabriela Domínguez Ruvalcaba	Artegios Distribución	
S E P T E M B E R	4	Érase una vez en un ring	Director: José Medina E. Cast: Luis Alberti, Blue Demon Jr., Nora Velázquez, Gabriela Montiel, Carlos Abraham Gongo	—N/a	
S E P T E M B E R	4	Leonora in the Morning Light (Leonora)	Director: Thorsten Klein & Lena Vurma Cast: Olivia Vinall, Alexander Scheer, Cassandra Ciangherotti, Ryan Gage, István Teglas, Luis Gerardo Méndez, Denis Eyriey, Cat Jugravu, Wren Stembridge, Mercedes Bahleda	—N/a	
S E P T E M B E R	11	Chronicles from the Other North (Crónicas del otro norte)	Director: Miguel León	Benuca Films	
S E P T E M B E R	11	Rock, Weed and Wheels (Autos, mota y rocanrol)	Director: José Manuel Cravioto Cast: Emiliano Zurita, Alejandro Speitzer, Ianis Guerrero, Ruy Senderos, Juan Pablo de Santiago, Luis Curiel, Enrique Arrison, Alex Fernández, Fran Hevia	Cinépolis Distribución	
S E P T E M B E R	11	Dreams	Director: Michel Franco Cast: Jessica Chastain, Isaac Hernández, Rupert Friend, Marshall Bell, Eligio Meléndez, Mercedes Hernández	Imagem Films	
S E P T E M B E R	18	Aztec Batman: Clash of Empires (Batman azteca: Choque de imperios)	Director: Juan Meza-León	Cinépolis Distribución	
S E P T E M B E R	18	The Follies (Las locuras)	Director: Rodrigo García Cast: Naian González Norvind, Adriana Barraza, Ilse Salas, Cassandra Ciangherotti, Mónica del Carmen, Raúl Briones, Natalia Solián, Alfredo Castro, Fernando Cattori, Fernanda Castillo, Daniel Tovar, Ángeles Cruz, Juanki Durán	Pimienta Films	
S E P T E M B E R	25	Desastre en familia	Director: Manuel Caramés Cast: Itatí Cantoral, Ariel Miramontes, Karla Gaytán, Diego Peniche, Harold Azuara, Ricardo Fastlicht, Raúl Araiza, Ana Paula Capetillo, Eduardo Capetillo Gaytán, Santiago Barajas	Videocine	
S E P T E M B E R	25	The Last Journey (El último viaje)	Director: Rodolfo Santa María Troncoso	Artegios Distribución	
S E P T E M B E R	25	A Mexican on the Moon (Un mexicano en la Luna)	Director: Francis Levy, Techus Guerrero, Jose Luis Yanez Cast: Héctor Jiménez, Fermín Martínez, Alessio Lapice, Roberto Ballesteros, Jorge Levy, Pancho Rodríguez, Ausencio Cruz, Magdalena Caravallo, Carlos Valencia, Maryfer Santillán, Mónica Tafolla	CNMG Distribucion	
O C T O B E R	2	A History of Love and War (Una película de amor y guerra)	Director: Santiago Mohar Volkow Cast: Andrew Leland Rogers, Lucía Gómez-Robledo, Patricia Bernal, Hernan Del Riego, Santiago Espejo, Manuel Garcia-Rulfo, Sophie Gómez, Maria Hinojos, Florencia Ríos, Dario Yazbek Bernal, Fernando Álvarez Rebeil, Mónica del Carmen, José Carlos Illanes, Sharon Kleinberg, Sara Montalvo, Aldo Escalante, Teresa Sanchez	Videocine	
O C T O B E R	9	A Better World (Un mundo mejor)	Director: Janett Juárez Cast: Raúl Briones, Sonia Franco, Mateo Diaz	Benuca Films	
O C T O B E R	9	Holiness Kit (Kit de santidad: El camino a Dios de Carlo Acutis)	Director: Pablo Casso Cast: Antonio Mauri, Antonia Acutis, Padre Borre, José Gómez, José Ignacio Munilla, Rafael Capo	Ave María Films	
O C T O B E R	9	Lachatao	Director: Natalia Bruschtein Cast: Leslie Marcos, Eva Marcos, Alexa Santiago, Diego Santiago, Luis Uriel Bautista, Daniela Mitzary Bautista, Sofía Hernández, Paulina Santiago	Mandarina Cine	
O C T O B E R	16	Highway Nomads (Nómadas de la 57)	Director: Alberto Arnaut Estrada & José María Castro Ibarra	—N/a	
O C T O B E R	23	I Am Frankelda (Soy Frankelda)	Director: Arturo and Roy Ambriz Cast: Mireya Mendoza, Arturo Mercado Jr., Luis Leonardo Suárez, Carlos Segundo, Beto Castillo, Assira Abbate, Anahí Allué, Arturo Ambriz, Lourdes Ambriz, Roy Ambriz, Antonio Badía, Sergio Carranza, Jesse Conde, Idzi Dulkiewicz, Karla Falcón, Magda Giner, Juan Pablo Monterrubio, Habana Zoe	Cinépolis Distribución	
O C T O B E R	30	Don't Follow Me (No me sigas)	Director: Ximena García Lecuona & Eduardo Lecuona Cast: Karla Coronado, Julia Maqueo, Yankel Stevan	Cinépolis Distribución	
N O V E M B E R	13	Tormento	Director: Olallo Rubio Cast: Natalia Solián, Hoze Meléndez, Fernando Banda, Dolores Espinoza	Videocine	
D E C E M B E R	11	El diablo en el camino	Director: Carlos Armella Cast: Luis Alberti, Aketzaly Verástegui, Mayra Batalla, Ricardo Uscanga, Osvaldo Sánchez, Roberto Oropeza	Piano Distribución	
D E C E M B E R	25	La celda de los milagros	Director: Ana Lorena Pérez Ríos Cast: Omar Chaparro, Mariana Calderón, Gustavo Sánchez Parra, Natalia Reyes Reyes	Cinépolis Distribución	

== Box office ==
The five highest-grossing Mexican films in 2025, by in-year domestic box office gross revenue, were as follows:

Highest-grossing Mexican films of 2025
Rank	Title	Distributor	Admissions	Gross (million MX$)
1	Gift Table (Mesa de regalos)	Star Distribution	1,900,000	136.6
2	Mirreyes contra Godínez: Las Vegas	Videocine	1,140,000	71.6
3	I Am Frankelda (Soy Frankelda)	Cinépolis Distribución	830,000	50.4
4	Winner Takes the Cake (¡Qué huevos, Sofía!)	Cinépolis Distribución	736,000	50.1
5	Mamá reinventada	Videocine	516,000	36.7

== See also ==
- List of 2025 box office number-one films in Mexico
