= Armando Said =

Mexican actor

- Born: Armando Said Flores Hernandez; 16 June 2006 (age 18); Mexico City
- Education: Centro de Educación Artística
- Occupation: Actor
- Years active: 2012–present
- Height: 180 cm (5 ft 11 in)

Armando Said Flores Hernandez ([aɾˈmando saˈið ˈfloɾes eɾˈnandes]) (born 16 June 2006) is a Mexican male actor.

== Biography ==
In 2015 he studied in Centro de Educación Artística of Televisa.

participed in movie "Por mis bigotes" as Marcelino. After he participed in series Como dice el dicho, La Rosa de Guadalupe and ZeroZeroZero

In 2021 interpreted as Pablo Lopez of Netflix Guerra de Vecinos with Vanessa Bauche, Ana Layevska, Mark Tacher, Elyfer Torres, Christian Vázquez (actor), Loreto Peralta and Marco López

== Filmography ==
Year	Title	Role	Notes	Ref.
2015	Por mis bigotes	Marcelino	Supporting role	
2016–2018	Como dice el dicho	Saúl / Javier	Guest appearance	
2017	LUCHA: Fight, Wrestle, Struggle	Jorge (Young)	Protagonist	
2018	La Rosa de Guadalupe	Misael	Supporting role	
2020	ZeroZeroZero	Miguel Angel	Guest appearance	
2021	The War Next-door	Pablo Lopez Salcido	Protagonist	
