= Mirreyes contra Godínez 2: El retiro =

- Directed by: Chava Cartas
- Written by: Angélica Gudiño; Juan Carlos Garzón
- Produced by: Francisco González Compeán; Ruth Cherem Daniel
- Starring: Regina Blandón; Alejandro de Marino; Daniel Tovar; Diana Bovio
- Cinematography: Beto Casillas
- Edited by: Juan Fontana; Víctor González
- Music by: Luca Ortega
- Production company: Draco Films
- Distributed by: Vix+; Videocine
- Release date: 21 July 2022
- Running time: 97 minutes
- Country: Mexico
- Language: Spanish

Mirreyes contra Godínez 2: El retiro (lit. 'Mirreyes vs. Godínez 2: The Retreat') is a 2022 Mexican comedy film directed by Chava Cartas. The film stars Daniel Tovar, Regina Blandón, Alejandro de Marino, and Diana Bovio. It is the sequel to the 2019 film Mirreyes contra Godínez, and was released by Vix+ on 21 July 2022.

== Cast ==
- Regina Blandón as Michelle Kuri
- Daniel Tovar as Genaro González
- Alejandro de Marino as Shimon
- Diana Bovio as Nancy
- Christian Vázquez as Conan
- Roberto Aguire as Ricardo
- Gloria Stalina as Sofía
- Michelle Rodríguez as Goyita
- Tomás Rojas as Arquímedes
- Roberta Damián as Lua
- Carlos Ballarta as El Timido
- Dominika Paleta as Katia San Martín
- Claudia Ramírez as Emilia Kuri
- César Bono as Vicente
- Daniel García as Urrutia
- Mario Monroy as Police officer

== Production ==
On 31 October 2019, it was confirmed that a sequel to Mirreyes contra Godínez had been greenlit, and principal photography began in February 2020. Production of the film was put on hiatus after five days of filming as a safety precaution due to the COVID-19 pandemic. Filming concluded in early 2022.

== Release ==
The film was released on 21 July 2022 by Vix+.

== Sequel ==
A third film titled Mirreyes contra Godínez: Las Vegas was released on August 14, 2025, in Mexican theaters.
