= Ruy Senderos =

Mexican actor (born 1988)

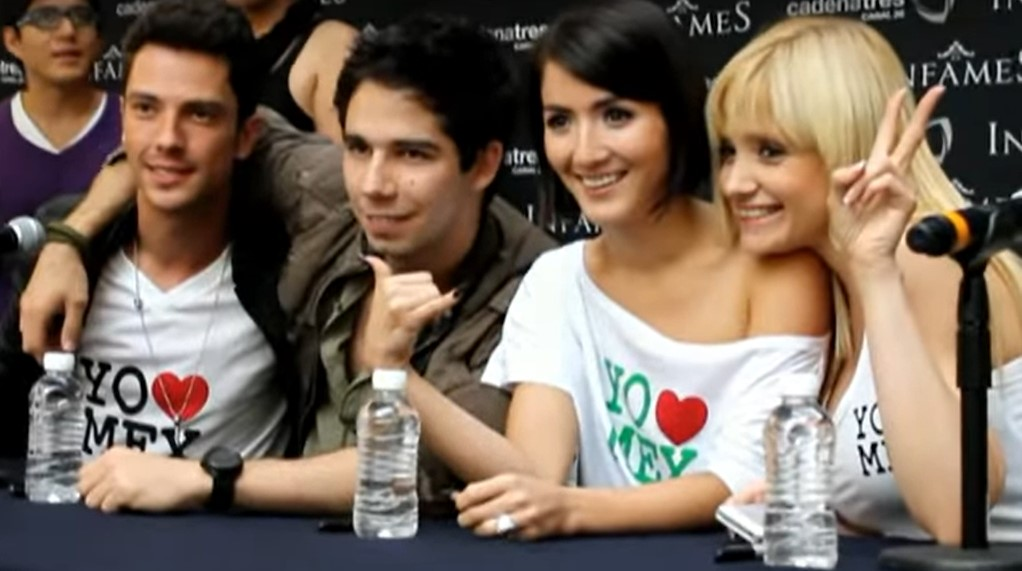
- Senderos in an autograph firm in June 2012 with Lisette Morelos, Aldo Gallardo, and Eréndira Ibarra
- Born: 8 August 1988 (age 37)
- Years active: 2011–present

Ruy Senderos (born 8 August 1988) is a Mexican actor. He is known for his performance as Heriberto Casillas in the Telemundo series El Señor de los Cielos. Although he previously had a notable character in the Argos Comunicación series Infames. Senderos has had main characters in series as La fiscal de hierro (2017), Ninis (2018), and currently in Julia vs. Julia (2019).

== Filmography ==
=== Film roles ===
Year	Title	Roles	Notes
2011	Malaventura	El Semilla	
2016	Purasangre	Tino	
2016	La niña de la mina	Ricky	
2023	Unhappily Ever After	Bicho	

=== Television roles ===
Year	Title	Roles	Notes
2011	Bienvenida realidad	Bruno Arteaga	
2012	Infames	Ricardo "Ricky" Benavides	
2013–2014	El Señor de los Cielos	Heriberto Casillas	Recurring role (seasons 1–2); 128 episodes
2016–2017	Drunk History	Iturbide / Raúl	2 episodes
2016	Rosario Tijeras	Damián González	Recurring role (season 1); 21 episodes
2017	La fiscal de hierro	Argemiro Durán	
2018	Paramédicos	Cuauhtemoc Guzmán	Episode: "Peligro en casa"
2018	Señora Acero	Bernardo Antolin	Recurring role (season 5); 10 episodes
2018	Ninis	Rodri	Main role; 10 episodes
2019	Mi propósito eres tú	Jaime	Television special
2019–present	Julia vs. Julia	Jaime	Main role (season 1); 13 episodes
2020	Ana		Episode: "Banana"
2020	A Couple in Quarantin	Héctor	
2020	Enemigo íntimo	Ricardo Medina	Main role (season 2)
2026	Bodas S.A.	Julio	Main role
