= Mi propósito eres tú =

Mexican television special

- Genre: Television special
- Presented by: Mané de la Parra
- Theme music composer: Fernando Rivera
- Opening theme: "Mi propósito eres tú"
- Country of origin: Mexico
- Original language: Spanish
- No. of episodes: 3 (special)

Production
- Camera setup: Multi-camera
- Production company: Televisa

Original release
- Network: Las Estrellas
- Release: 18 December 2018 – 16 December 2019

Mi propósito eres tú is a Mexican television special short created by Televisa and broadcast on Las Estrellas. The first short was shown for the first time on 18 December 2018. The special at first, was created to make a Christmas campaign and closing of the New Year's Eve of 2018. The first short consisted to show a preview of the new telenovelas and series that Televisa would produce for 2019. Among the series that were shown in the short as new productions were: Ringo, This Is Silvia Pinal, Doña Flor y sus dos maridos, Como dice el dicho, Los elegidos (in the short as "Los protegidos"), La reina soy yo, Por amar sin ley, El Dragón: Return of a Warrior (as "El último dragón"), and No Fear of Truth: Awake. Despite not having been renewed for new seasons, some characters from series and telenovelas such as La Piloto, Mi marido tiene familia, Amar a muerte, and Like appeared in the special.

The special is presented by Mané de la Parra, who also appears singing the song "Mi propósito eres tú" during the special. Although the special was created with a unique motive, on 22 March 2019, Las Estrellas released another special, now turned into a parody to promote their new comedy series. In this second special the main theme is still "Mi próposito eres tú", now turned into parody as "Mi propósito es hacerte reír" and is interpreted in general by the entire cast of different series. Among the comedy series that appeared in the second short were: Vecinos, Simón dice, Una familia de diez, Alma de ángel, Lorenza, Mi lista de exes, Julia vs. Julia, Nosotros los guapos, Renta congelada, and Mi querida herencia (as "Hasta que la herencia nos separe").

On 16 December 2019, another special was released for the 2019–2020 season, where Televisa renewed some of its old programs for new seasons and included new productions such as Vencer el miedo, Te doy la vida, Médicos, Soltero con hijas, the third season of No Fear of Truth, the second season of ¿Quién es la máscara?.

== Notable guest cast ==
=== Season 2018–2019 ===
- Mané de la Parra as himself / Juan José "Juanjo" Montés
- Silvia Pinal as herself
- Itatí Cantoral as Silvia Pinal / herself
- Sebastián Rulli as Miguel Garza
- Renata Notni as Adela Cruz
- Irina Baeva as Jimena Ortiz
- Zuria Vega as Julieta Aguilar Rivera
- Diana Bracho as Blanca Gómez de Córcega
- Daniel Arenas as Robert Cooper / Juan Pablo Córcega
- Arath de la Torre as Francisco "Pancho" López
- Gabriel Soto as Ernesto "Neto" Rey
- Livia Brito as Yolanda Cadena
- Sergio Corona as Don Tomás
- Ana Serradilla as María Florencia "Doña Flor" Méndez Canul
- Sergio Mur as Teodoro "Teo" Hidalgo Flores
- Mariluz Bermúdez as Samantha Cabrera de Mercader
- Joaquín Ferreira as Valentín Hernández "El Vale"
- Carlos Ferro as Mario Calderón / Mario García
- Macarena García as Sandra García García / María Asunción "Machu" Salas Oliver
- Álex Perea as Manuel "Manu" Montero
- Angelique Boyer as Lucía Borges
- Michel Brown as Macario Valdés
- Alexis Ayala as León Carvajal
- Alejandro Nones as Jonathan "Johnny" Corona
- Mariana Torres as Julia Garay
- César Évora as Óscar "Oso" Villar
- David Zepeda as Ricardo Bustamante
- Julián Gil as Carlos Ibarra
- Kimberly Dos Ramos as Sofía Alcocer
- Michelle Renaud as Yamelí Montoya
- Polo Morín as Erick Cruz Montoya
- Ale Müller as Emilia Ruiz Ayala
- Anna Iriyama as Keiko Kobayashi
- Santiago Achaga as Claudio Meyer
- Niurka Marcos as Alma
- Raúl Araiza as Paco
