= Como novio de pueblo =

2019 Mexican comedy film

- Directed by: Joe Rendón
- Written by: Daniel Sánchez Arévalo
- Based on: Cousinhood by Daniel Sánchez Arévalo
- Starring: José María de Tavira; Regina Blandón; Ricardo Polanco; Martín Altomaro
- Cinematography: Daniel Blanco
- Edited by: Joaquim Martí
- Music by: Franco Medina-Mora
- Production company: Traziende Films
- Distributed by: Warner Bros. Pictures
- Release date: 15 March 2019 (Mexico)
- Country: Mexico
- Language: Spanish

Como novio de pueblo (lit. '"Like a small town groom"') is a 2019 Mexican comedy film directed by Joe Rendón. The film premiered on 15 March 2019, starred by José María de Tavira opposite Regina Blandón, with Martín Altomaro, and Ricardo Polanco in supporting roles . The plot revolves around Diego, who after being stood up on his wedding day is shattered and goes from living the best day of his life to having the worst moment of his existence. His cousins do not allow Diego to fall and take him to the beach to forget and have fun. it's an adaptation of the Spanish film Cousinhood by Daniel Sánchez Arévalo.

== Cast ==
- José María de Tavira as Diego
- Regina Blandón as Martina
- Ricardo Polanco as Miguel
- Martín Altomaro as Julián
- Damayanti Quintanar as Yolanda
- Marianna Burelli as Toña
- Emiliano Saiz y Madrid as Dani
- Víctor Huggo Martin as Bachi
- Alicia Jaziz as Clara
- Daniel Tovar as Andrés Barragán
