= Regina Blandón =

Mexican actress (born 1990)

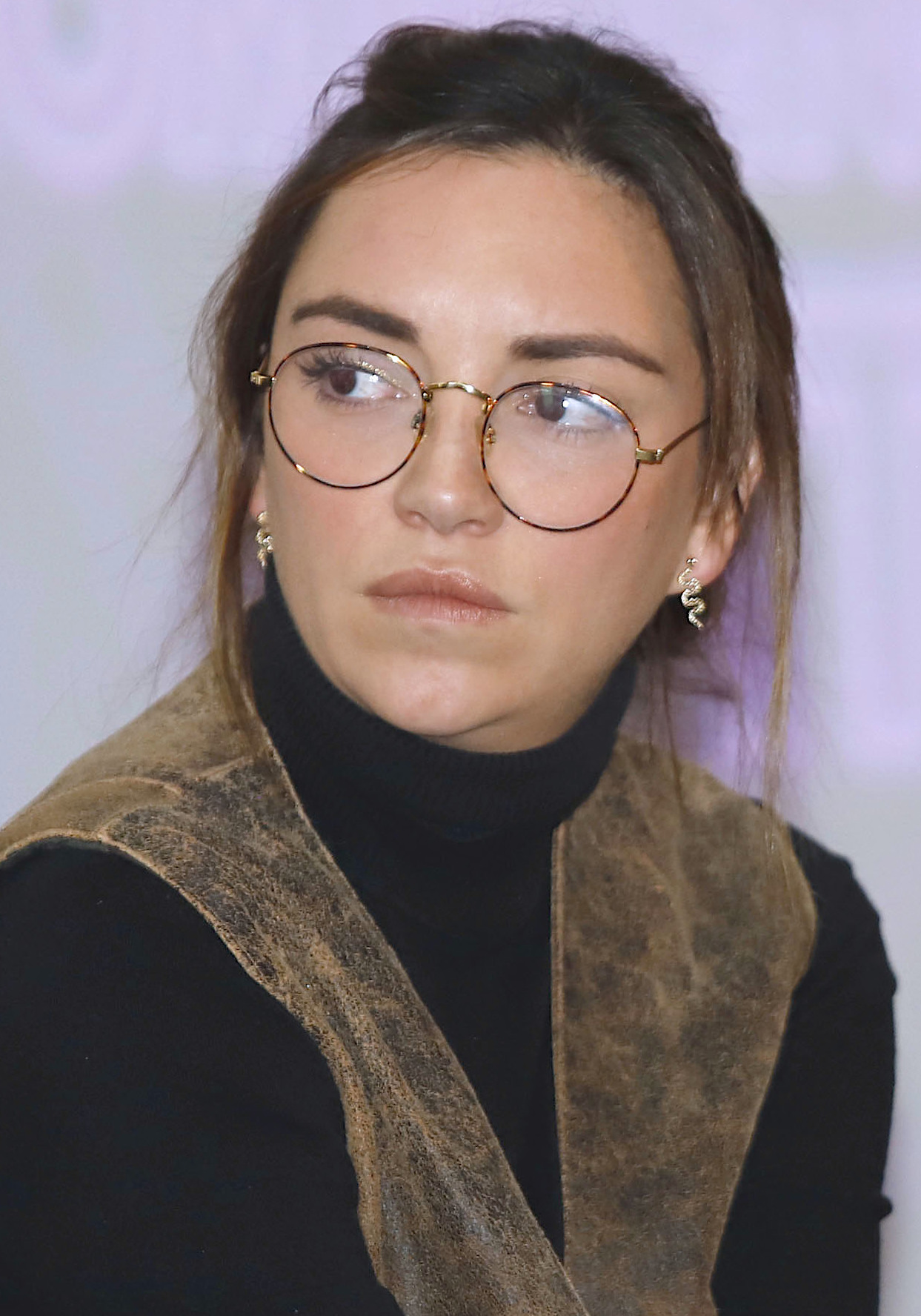
- Blandón in 2020
- Born: July 25, 1990 (age 35); Mexico City, Mexico
- Occupation: Actress
- Years active: 2002–present
- Spouse: Roberto Flores (m. 2017; div. 2018)

Regina Blandón (born July 25, 1990) is a Mexican actress. She is known for her role as Bibi P. Luche in the sitcom, La familia P. Luche.

== Biography ==
Blandón was born on July 25, 1990, and is the daughter of actor Roberto Blandón. Her stepmother, Rebeca Mankita, is also an actress. She became popular for her role as Bibi P. Luche, the "weird" girl in the television series La familia P. Luche, working alongside comedians Eugenio Derbez and Consuelo Duval. In 2003, she debuted on film in El misterio de la Trinidad, which earned her a nomination for the Ariel award for Best Supporting Actress.

In 2013, Blandón starred as Maria, Patricia and Ana in Nacho Cano's musical Hoy No Me Puedo Levantar. In the same year, she debuted in the Canal 5 program Me caigo de risa.

In 2016, Blandón was in El hotel de los secretos as Matilde, the best friend of Irene Azuela's character, sharing credits with Erick Elías.

Blandón married comedian Roberto Flores in September 2017. However, they divorced 10 months later.

== Filmography ==
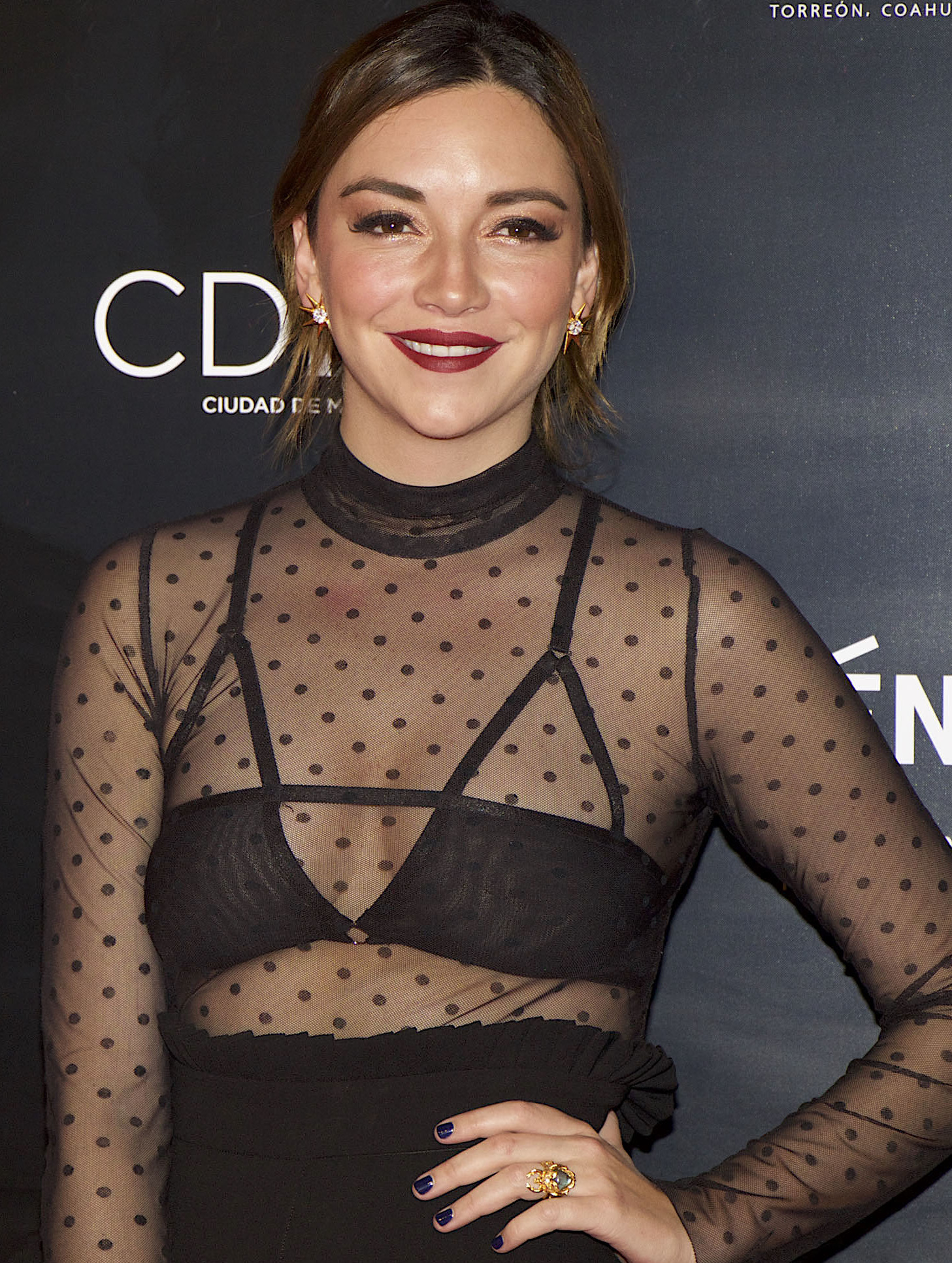
Blandón in 2018

=== Film roles ===
Year	Title	Roles	Notes
2003	Zurdo	Carmita	
2003	El misterio del Trinidad	Ana Aguirre	
2014	Sunset Heart	Monica	Short film
2016	La niña de la mina	Sara	
2018	Loca por el trabajo	Fabiana	
2019	Mirreyes contra Godínez	Michelle	
2019	En las buenas y en las malas	Ale	
2019	Como novio de pueblo	Martina	
2019	Dulce familia	Bárbara	
2019	Placa de acero	News anchor	
2020	La liga de los 5	Dolores	Voice role
2020	Cindy la Regia	Angie	
2020	Sin Hijos	Marina	
2021	Guerra de likes	Raquel	
2022	Mirreyes contra Godínez 2: El retiro	Michelle Kuri	
2023	Invitación a un asesinato	Agatha	Released by Netflix as A Deadly Invitation.
2025	Mirreyes contra Godínez: Las Vegas	Mich	

=== Television roles ===
Year	Title	Roles	Notes
2002–2012	La familia P. Luche	Bibi P. Luche	Main role (seasons 1–3); 68 episodes
2004	Hospital el paisa	Exorcisada	Episode: "Pos... esa nos espanta"
2007	XHDRbZ	Bibi P. Luche	Series regular; 24 episodes
2009	Los simuladores	Violeta	Episodes: "Madre arrepentida" and "El gran motul"
2015	Que te perdone Dios	Young Helena Fuentes	Recurring role; 14 episodes
2016	El hotel de los secretos	Matilde	Series regular; 67 episodes
2016	Mercado Central	Herself	Episode: "Dos"
2016	Drunk History	La Carambada	Episode: "Santa vs. Quetzalcóatl, La muerte de Juárez, Malverde"
2017	Súper X	Tatiana	
2017–2022	Renta congelada	Ana Donají-Álvarez	Main role (seasons 1–2); 26 episodes
2019	Mi propósito eres tú	Ana Donají-Álvarez	Television special
2019	¿Quién es la máscara?	Zorro	
2020	Crime Diaries: The Search	Carolina Tello	Main role; 6 episodes
2025–present	Enloqueciendo contigo	Jimena	Main role
2025	Mentiras, la serie	Yuri	Main role

== Awards and nominations ==
Year	Award	Category	Nominated work	Result
2004	Premios Ariel	Best Supporting Actress	El misterio del Trinidad	Nominated
2017	Premios TVyNovelas	Best Female Revelation	El hotel de los secretos	Nominated
