= Loca por el trabajo =

- Directed by: Luis Eduardo Reyes
- Written by: Flavia Atencio; José Luis Gutiérrez Arias; Gustavo Rodríguez; Concepcion Taboada
- Story by: Osvaldo de León
- Starring: Bárbara de Regil
- Cinematography: Fido Pérez-Gavilán
- Edited by: Óscar Figueroa
- Music by: Pascual Reyes
- Production company: Spectrum Films
- Distributed by: Videocine
- Release date: 16 November 2018 (Mexico)
- Country: Mexico
- Language: Spanish

Loca por el trabajo is a 2018 Mexican comedy film directed by Luis Eduardo Reyes. The story revolves around Alicia (Bárbara de Regil), a successful workaholic executive, who puts her company's needs before her family's needs, and her struggle to balance her work and coexistence with her son. It premiered on 16 November 2018 in Mexico.

== Cast ==
- Bárbara de Regil as Alicia
- Adriana Barraza as Mercedes
- Marianna Burelli as Marcela
- Alberto Guerra as Leonardo
- Hernán Mendoza as Braulio
- Martha Claudia Moreno as Rosa
- Julio Bekhor as Gerente Banco
- Regina Blandón as Fabiana
- Daniel Tovar as Rosendo
