= The House in the South =

1975 film

- Directed by: Sergio Olhovich
- Written by: Eduardo Luján; Sergio Olhovich
- Starring: David Reynoso
- Release date: July 1975
- Running time: 104 minutes
- Country: Mexico
- Language: Spanish

The House in the South (Spanish: La casa del Sur) is a 1975 Mexican drama film directed by Sergio Olhovich. It was entered into the 9th Moscow International Film Festival.

== Cast ==
- David Reynoso as Don Augusto
- Helena Rojo as Elena
- Salvador Sánchez as Genaro
- Rodrigo Puebla as Cosme
- Patricia Reyes Spíndola as María
- Aurora Clavel as Jacinta
- José Chávez as El Gordo (as José Chávez Trowe)
- Enrique Lucero as Ramón
- Farnesio de Bernal as Cura
- José Carlos Ruiz as Tomás
- Ricardo Fuentes as Ingeniero Torres
