= Rain (2023 film) =

- Theatrical release poster
- Directed by: Rodrigo García Saiz
- Written by: Paula Markovitch
- Produced by: Rodrigo García Sáiz; Paola Cortés León; Araceli Velázquez
- Starring: Bruno Bichir; Cecilia Suárez; Arcelia Ramírez; Dolores Heredia; Karina Gidi
- Cinematography: Leonardo Hermo
- Edited by: Liora Spilk Bialostozky
- Music by: Ramiro del Real
- Production companies: Central Films; Martini Shot; Panamericana Pictures; The 42 Film
- Release dates: October 22, 2023 (FICM); January 30, 2025 (Mexico)
- Running time: 95 minutes
- Country: Mexico
- Languages: Spanish; English

Rain (Spanish: Lluvia) is a 2023 Mexican anthology drama film directed by Rodrigo García Saiz (in his directorial debut) and written by Paula Markovitch. The film is made up of 6 stories set in Mexico City where the characters are immersed in their daily despair while being pursued by a rain. It is composed of an ensemble cast that includes Bruno Bichir, Cecilia Suárez, Arcelia Ramírez, Dolores Heredia and Karina Gidi.

== Synopsis ==
In a rainy storm in Mexico City, six stories starring people sunk into the routine of despair (a taxi driver, a couple, an English teacher, a nurse, a sex worker and a young delinquent) will experience an unexpected moment that will reveal who they are.

== Cast ==
The actors participating in this film are:

- Bruno Bichir as Jorge
- Cecilia Suárez as Ana
- Arcelia Ramírez as Sofia
- Dolores Heredia as Laurita
- Karina Gidi as Carmen
- Hoze Meléndez as Lucas
- Kristyan Ferrer as Pablo
- Martha Claudia Moreno as Angi
- Mauricio Isaac as Esteban
- Andrés De León as Passenger
- Tonatiuh Salazar as Edgar
- Esteban Caicedo as Hector
- Vitter Leija as El Primo
- Morganna Love as Florencia
- Orlando Oliva García as Marcos
- Axel Shuarma as El Gato
- Ileana Rodríguez Govela as Announcer
- Mayuko Nihei as Suki

== Release ==
Rain had its world premiere on October 22, 2023, at the 21st Morelia International Film Festival, then screened on March 8, 2024, at the 27th Málaga Film Festival, on April 13, 2024, at the 41st Miami Film Festival, and on June 2, 2024, at the Los Angeles Latino International Film Festival.

The film was released commercially on January 30, 2025, in Mexican theaters.

== Accolades ==
Award / Festival	Date of ceremony	Category	Recipient(s)	Result	Ref.
Málaga Film Festival	10 March 2024	Best Latin-American Film	Rain	Nominated	
Miami Film Festival	14 April 2024	Jordan Ressler First Feature Award	Rain	Nominated	
