= Boulevard (2014 film) =

- Theatrical release poster
- Directed by: Dito Montiel
- Written by: Douglas Soesbe
- Produced by: Monica Aguirre Diez Barroso; Mia Chang; Jeffrey Gelber; Ryan Belenzon
- Starring: Robin Williams; Kathy Baker; Roberto Aguire; Giles Matthey; Bob Odenkirk
- Cinematography: Chung Chung-hoon
- Edited by: Jake Pushinsky
- Music by: Jimmy Haun; David Wittman
- Production companies: Camellia Entertainment; Evil Media Empire
- Distributed by: Starz Digital
- Release dates: April 20, 2014 (Tribeca Film Festival); July 10, 2015 (United States)
- Running time: 88 minutes
- Country: United States
- Language: English
- Box office: $126,150

Boulevard is a 2014 American drama film directed by Dito Montiel and written by Douglas Soesbe. Starring Robin Williams, Kathy Baker, Roberto Aguire, Eleonore Hendricks, Giles Matthey and Bob Odenkirk, the film premiered at the Tribeca Film Festival on April 20, 2014. The film was theatrically released on July 10, 2015, in a limited release by Starz Digital.

== Plot ==
Nolan Mack has worked at the same bank for almost 26 years in a life of monotony. He and his wife Joy have embraced their marriage as a convenient and comfortable distraction from facing reality. What starts as an aimless drive down an unfamiliar street turns into a life-altering decision for Nolan when, on his drive home from visiting his ailing father at a hospital, he nearly hits a troubled young hustler named Leo.

Nolan begins to seek out Leo and spend time with him. As Nolan spends more time with Leo, he breaks from the confines of his old life and come to terms with who he really is. He begins to behave out of character, oversleeping and missing important meetings.

Nolan attempts to help Leo to escape the life of prostitution by getting him a job, for which he fails to appear. He also encourages him to return to school and offers to help him financially. One day, Leo comes to Nolan's workplace asking for help. Nolan escorts Leo out of the building but is confronted by Leo's pimp, demanding $3,200 allegedly owed to him. During the conflict, the bank's patrons observe Nolan, Leo and the pimp in the parking lot. The police arrive and arrest the pimp. Nolan takes Leo back to his house, for his wife is out of town on business. But Leo leaves sometime after Nolan falls asleep. Joy arrives home early from her business trip and wakes Nolan.

Soon thereafter, Nolan and Joy are preparing to have dinner with the regional bank manager and the local branch manager regarding a potential promotion for Nolan. Prior to leaving for the dinner, Nolan receives a phone call. He leaves, telling Joy to go to the dinner and that he will meet her there. Nolan arrives at the hospital, where Leo is recovering from an overdose. Nolan is directed to Leo's room by a doctor, but Leo is no longer there. The hospital staff believes that Leo checked himself out and left. Nolan starts looking around town for Leo. He goes to his apartment and the place where they met, but he does not find him.

While searching for Leo, Nolan has missed the business dinner, so he decides to return home. He arrives to find an angry Joy waiting for him. She asks why he never came to the dinner, and indicates that she knows that Nolan is having an affair with a man. Nolan tells her that he wants to leave the marriage. Joy prefers to keep the status quo, but Nolan is ready to live in the real world and stop pretending that he is someone he isn't.

Nolan packs up and quits his job, tells his best friend that he is moving to New York City, and meets a man in a cafe, presumably on a date. Joy appears to move on as well, taking the vacation cruise alone that she had wanted for herself and Nolan.

== Cast ==
- Robin Williams as Nolan Mack
- Kathy Baker as Joy Mack
- Roberto Aguire as Leo
- Bob Odenkirk as Winston
- Eleonore Hendricks as Patty
- Giles Matthey as Eddie
- Henry Haggard as Beaumont
- Gary Gardner as Lionel Mack, Nolan's father
- J. Karen Thomas as Cat
- Sondra Morton as Gloria Beaumont
- Jerry Chipman as Blyden
- Joshua Decker as ER Doctor
- Brandon Hirsch as Brad
- Landon Marshall as Mark

== Production ==
Screenwriter Douglas Soesbe underwent a similar coming out experience, telling the Creative Screenwriting website, "I came out very late and with a great deal of guilt. This movie is not about me, but I really understand that character."

Soesbe wrote the first draft of the screenplay, which was set in Los Angeles ten years earlier, and because of its subject matter, did not expect it to be produced. When producers showed interest in the project, Soesbe rewrote the script to set the story in a small town that would be "more constricted than Los Angeles".

== Release ==
After its premiere at the Tribeca Film Festival in 2014, the film found distribution from Starz Digital, and was released in theaters on July 10, 2015, almost a year after William’s death. The film was shown at the Frameline Film Festival, the Miami LGBT Film Festival, Montclair Film Festival, and the Seattle International Film Festival.

=== Critical reception ===
Boulevard received mixed reviews from critics. On Rotten Tomatoes, the film has a rating of 53%, based on 72 reviews, with an average rating of 5.57/10. The site's critical consensus reads: "Boulevard features a richly layered performance from Robin Williams, but that may be this dour drama's sole distinctive feature." On Metacritic, the film has a score of 52 out of 100, based on 22 critics, indicating "mixed or average" reviews.

IGN awarded the film a score of 7.0 out of 10, saying, "It doesn't offer Williams doing any truly brilliant bits of comedy, nor is it a role that is destined to be iconic, but it fits."
