= Bodas S.A. =

- Genre: Comedy
- Created by: Erik Zuckermann; José A. Terán
- Written by: Erik Zuckermann; José A. Terán
- Directed by: José A. Terán
- Starring: Miguel Rodarte; Paulina Gaitán; Tessa Ía; Aldo Escalante Ochoa
- Composers: David Melchor; Mike Moreno
- Country of origin: Mexico
- Original language: Spanish
- No. of seasons: 1
- No. of episodes: 8

Production
- Executive producers: Gabriela Remirez; Jennevie Olivieri López; Mark Alazraki; Moisés Chiver; José A. Terán; Erik Zuckermann
- Producer: Adrián Ituarte
- Cinematography: Leslie Montero
- Editor: Verónica López Escalona
- Camera setup: Multi-camera
- Production company: Maquina Vega

Original release
- Network: Vix
- Release: 13 February 2026

Bodas S.A. is a Mexican comedy television series created by Erik Zuckermann and José A. Terán. It stars Consuelo Duval and Giselle Kuri. The series premiered on Vix on 13 February 2026.

== Cast ==
=== Main ===
- Consuelo Duval as Silvia Curiel
- Giselle Kuri as Estefania "Fannie" Curiel
- Danaé Reynaud as Coral
- Ruy Senderos as Julio
- Rubén Zamora as Ricardo Chacón
- Antonio de la Vega as Santiago Torres

=== Recurring and guest stars ===
- Paul Stanley as Nico
- Paly Duval as Ana Rosa de la Vega
- David Angulo a Joaquín Silvestre
- Michael Ronda as Tato
- Roberto Ríos as Jorge de la Vega
- Christian Chávez as Guillermo Maximiliano "Memomax"
- Luis Fernando Zarate as Archbishop Carlos Rivas
- Geraldine Zinat as Dr. Goldstein
- Michel Chauvet as Jesús
- Valeria Santaella as Denise

== Episodes ==
No.	Title	Original release date
1	"Sí, acepto"	13 February 2026
2	"La confirmación"	13 February 2026
3	"La dama de honor"	13 February 2026
4	"Y vivieron felices para siempre"	13 February 2026
5	"En la salud y la enfermedad"	13 February 2026
6	"La boda del año"	13 February 2026
7	"Save the Date"	13 February 2026
8	"La cuerda de tres hilos"	13 February 2026
9	"La despedida"	13 February 2026
10	"Hasta que la muerte los separe"	13 February 2026
