= Selena's Secret =

- El secreto de Selena
- Genre: Biographical
- Created by: David Jasqui; Alejandro Aimetta
- Based on: El secreto de Selena by María Celeste Arrarás
- Screenplay by: Leonardo Aranguibel
- Directed by: Alejandro Aimetta; Natalia Beristain
- Opening theme: "Que la vida vale" by Natalia Lafourcade
- Country of origin: United States
- Original language: Spanish
- No. of seasons: 1
- No. of episodes: 13

Production
- Executive producers: Francisco Cordero; Leonardo Aranguibel; María Celeste Arrarás; Fernando Barbosa; Luis Balaguer; Ricardo Coeto
- Producer: Mariano Carranco
- Production companies: Disney Media Distribution; BTF Media

Original release
- Network: TNT
- Release: 23 September – 16 December 2018

Related
- Selena: The Series (2020)

El secreto de Selena (English: Selena's Secret) is an American television series produced by BTF Media and co-produced by Disney Media Distribution for Telemundo, and it is based on the bestselling book by Emmy Award-winning journalist María Celeste Arrarás. The series follows the story behind the murder of singer Selena. It stars Maya Zapata as the titular character. It premiered in Latin America on TNT on 23 September 2018 and ended on 16 December 2018. On Telemundo the series premiered on 25 August 2019.

Production began on 9 April 2018, and 13 episodes of an hour were confirmed.

== Premise ==
Selena Quintanilla was a successful singer who had a tragic end when she was killed by Yolanda Saldívar, president of her fan club and personal friend. The dramatic outcome had a great impact on the media and generated all kinds of rumors about what really happened. The series delves into three characters who suffer as a result of their obsessions and passions. Selena, who gives everything to achieve success, Yolanda who has a fixation with her idol and Maria Celeste, the journalist who seeks to shed light on all the obscurities of the case.

== Cast ==
- Maya Zapata as Selena Quintanilla, an American tejano music singer.
- Damayanti Quintanar as Yolanda Saldívar, Selena's killer.
- Sofía Lama as María Celeste Arrarás, a Puerto Rican journalist.
- Eduardo Santamarina as Dr. Ricardo Martínez
- Jorge Zárate as Abraham Quintanilla
- Moisés Arizmendi as Manny
- Baltimore Beltrán as A.B. Quintanilla
- Bárbara González as Suzette Quintanilla
- David Zorrilla as Richard Frederickson
- José Sefami as Tinker
- Gustavo Egelhaaf as Alex
- Úrsula Pruneda as Marcella Quintanilla
- Mauricio Isaac as Pete Riviera
- María Aura as María López
- Daniel Elbittar as Chris Pérez
- Hector Kotsifakis as José Behar
- Fermín Martínez as Javier Ramos
- Antón Araiza as Jonás Carrillo
- Luis Alberti as Gustavo
- Irineo Álvarez as Arnold García
- Elyfer Torres as Gabriela Contreras

== U.S. ratings ==
Viewership and ratings per season of Selena's Secret
Season	Timeslot (ET)	Episodes	First aired		Last aired		Avg. viewers (millions)
Season	Timeslot (ET)	Episodes	Date	Viewers (millions)	Date	Viewers (millions)	Avg. viewers (millions)
1	Sunday 10:00 p.m.	13	25 August 2019	1.31	17 November 2019	0.91	0.85

=== Episodes ===
No.	Title	Original release date	U.S. air date	U.S. viewers (millions)
1	"Supernova"	23 September 2018	25 August 2019	1.31
The chaos generated by the murder of Selena at the hands of Yolanda, breaks into the lives of María Celeste Arrarás and the Quintanilla family.
2	"Al acecho"	30 September 2018	1 September 2019	0.88
Yolanda points a gun to her head, while the police negotiate her surrender. She seems to go crazy, when she finds out about Selena's death and accuses Abraham Quintanilla of being the culprit of everything.
3	"Paralelos"	7 October 2018	8 September 2019	0.92
Selena and Yolanda, work tirelessly to provide sustenance to their families. Although they seem polar opposites, they have so much in common that they feed their ambition at the expense of the other.
4	"Tormento"	14 October 2018	15 September 2019	0.84
Selena wants to keep the people she loves with her without sacrificing anyone.
5	"Atrapada"	21 October 2018	22 September 2019	0.81
María Celeste begins field research and focuses on the struggle of the Hispanic people to defend respect for their culture, which has a new identity symbol: Selena.
6	"Batallas"	28 October 2018	29 September 2019	0.83
Tinker, the new defense lawyer, struggles to get a fair trial, while María Celeste tries to interview Yolanda. Selena struggles to grow in her career.
7	"Verdades"	4 November 2018	6 October 2019	0.83
María Celeste reports the initial arguments of the trial. The prosecution seeks the maximum penalty and the defense promises to prove Yolanda innocent.
8	"Irreversible"	11 November 2018	13 October 2019	0.76
During the trial it is revealed why Yolanda decides to buy a weapon. María Celeste's research shows that after Abraham fired Yolanda, Selena sought her out to keep her by her side in secret.
9	"Espejismos"	18 November 2018	20 October 2019	N/A
The testimonies of the employees of the Days Inn motel and a two of the nurses present a view of what happened during the last hours of Selena's life, through her disenchantment with Yolanda and a mysterious attack that occurred in Mexico.
10	"Confesiones"	25 November 2018	27 October 2019	0.78
The defense presents the tapes of the Yolanda's standoff with law enforcement.
11	"Espectros"	2 December 2018	3 November 2019	0.60
The statements of doctors and experts explain what happened through the behavior of Selena and the marks on her body.
12	"Condena"	9 December 2018	10 November 2019	0.68
The defense presents, unsuccessfully, the case of Yolanda to try to prove that she accidentally killed Selena. The jury sentenced her to life imprisonment.
13	"Infinita"	16 December 2018	17 November 2019	0.91
María Celeste interviews Yolanda. In 2012, Dr. Martínez confesses his love affair with Selena, corroborating what Yolanda confessed to María Celeste.
