= El Rey del Valle =

- Genre: Drama
- Created by: Juan Camilo Ferrand
- Directed by: Rodrigo Ugalde De Haene
- Countries of origin: Mexico; United States
- Original language: Spanish
- No. of seasons: 2
- No. of episodes: 26

Production
- Production companies: Sony Pictures Television; Claro Video

Original release
- Network: Claro Video
- Release: August 23, 2018 – 2019

El Rey del Valle is a drama television series created by Juan Camilo Ferrand, and produced by Sony Pictures Television and Claro Video, that premiered on Claro Video on 23 August 2018. The series will stars Osvaldo Benavides, Daniel Tovar, and Paulina Gaitán.

Principal photography began on 24 January 2018, and the series will consist of two seasons each of thirteen episodes.

== Cast ==
- Osvaldo Benavides as Luis Miguel del Valle
- Daniel Tovar as José Édgar "Joed" Contreras
- Biassini Segura as Wilmer Camacho
- Paulina Gaitán as Margarita Guzmán
- Eduardo Victoria as Alejandro del Valle
- Laura Perico as Anabel del Valle
- Matías Moreno as Vitorín del Valle
- Héctor Holten as Emiliano Guzmán
- Lauren Emilia Ceballos as Xochitl
- Samadhi Zendejas as Chayo
