= The War Next-door =

Mexican comedy television series

- Guerra de vecinos
- Genre: Comedy
- Written by: Carmen Castro; Moises Dayan Schneider; Pablo Ortiz
- Original language: Spanish

Original release
- Release: 7 July 2021 – 17 June 2022

Guerra de vecinos (English title The War Next-door) is a Mexican comedy television series. The series premiered on Netflix on 7 July 2021. On 30 July 2021, the series was renewed for a second season, which premiered on June 17, 2022.

== Cast ==
- Vanessa Bauche as Leonor Salcido
- Ana Layevska as Silvia Espinoza
- Pascacio López as Genaro
- Elyfer Torres as Tere
- Loreto Peralta as Crista
- Mark Tacher as Ernesto
- Armando Said as Pablo
- Marco León as Diego
- Christian Vázquez as Tomas
- Sara Isabel Quintero as Dolores

== Episodes ==
=== Series overview ===
Season	Episodes	Originally released
1	8	July 7, 2021
2	8	June 17, 2022

=== Season 1 (2021) ===
No. overall	No. in season	Title	Directed by	Written by	Original release date
1	1	"The Rich Cry Too"	Salvador Espinosa	Unknown	July 7, 2021
2	2	"Axi-NacaR"	Salvador Espinosa	Unknown	July 7, 2021
3	3	"Muchach-app"	Noé Santillán-López	Unknown	July 7, 2021
4	4	"Game On"	Noé Santillán-López	Unknown	July 7, 2021
5	5	"Nothing to See Here!"	Ihtzi Hurtado	Unknown	July 7, 2021
6	6	"The Cold War"	Ihtzi Hurtado	Unknown	July 7, 2021
7	7	"Rappi-dín"	Sebastian Sarinana	Unknown	July 7, 2021
8	8	"Bellas Señoras"	Sebastian Sarinana	Unknown	July 7, 2021

=== Season 2 (2022) ===
No. overall	No. in season	Title	Directed by	Written by	Original release date
9	1	"The Funeral"	Unknown	Unknown	June 17, 2022
10	2	"Sonidero Time"	Unknown	Unknown	June 17, 2022
11	3	"The Fellowship of the Ring"	Unknown	Unknown	June 17, 2022
12	4	"Signals"	Unknown	Unknown	June 17, 2022
13	5	"Buen Fin vs. Thanksgiving"	Unknown	Unknown	June 17, 2022
14	6	"Mr. Barrio"	Unknown	Unknown	June 17, 2022
15	7	"Three-Way"	Unknown	Unknown	June 17, 2022
16	8	"Team LopeZpinosa"	Unknown	Unknown	June 17, 2022
