= A Cop Movie =

Documentary film

- Film poster
- Spanish: Una película de policías
- Directed by: Alonso Ruizpalacios
- Starring: Mónica Del Carmen; Raúl Briones
- Release date: March 2021 (Berlinale)
- Country: Mexico
- Language: Spanish

A Cop Movie (Spanish: Una película de policías) is a 2021 Mexican docudrama film directed by Alonso Ruizpalacios. The film stars Mónica Del Carmen and Raúl Briones.

The film had its worldwide premiere at the 71st Berlin International Film Festival in March 2021.

== Cast ==
The cast include:

- Monica Del Carmen as Teresa
- Raúl Briones as Montoya

== Release ==
On February 11, 2021, Berlinale announced that the film would have its worldwide premiere at the 71st Berlin International Film Festival in the Berlinale Competition section, in March 2021.

== Reception ==
On the review aggregator website Rotten Tomatoes, 92% of 36 critics' reviews are positive, with an average rating of 7.2/10. The website's consensus reads: "Smart and surprising, A Cop Movie grapples with themes that are as thorny as they are timely – and emerges a strikingly thought-provoking winner." Metacritic, which uses a weighted average, assigned the film a score of 76 out of 100, based on 14 critics, indicating "generally favorable" reviews.
