= La zona (film) =

- Directed by: Rodrigo Plá
- Written by: Laura Santullo
- Produced by: Alvaro Longoria; Pilar Benito
- Starring: Daniel Giménez Cacho; Maribel Verdú; Daniel Tovar
- Music by: Fernando Velázquez
- Release date: 2007
- Running time: 97 min
- Countries: Mexico; Spain
- Language: Spanish
- Box office: $2.8 million

La zona ("The Zone") is a 2007 Mexican-Spanish co-production film by director Rodrigo Plá. The film describes a failed break-in attempt in a gated community and the consequences for the thieves and the residents.

La zona was given the Venice Film Festival's award for best debut feature in 2007.

== Plot ==
Three disadvantaged teenage boys break into a gated community to steal but come up against the residents and their private security.

== Main cast ==
- Daniel Giménez Cacho as Daniel.
- Maribel Verdú as Mariana.
- Daniel Tovar as Alejandro.
- Carlos Bardem as Gerardo.
- Alan Chávez as Miguel.
- Mario Zaragoza as Rigoberto.

== Social and political aspects ==
La zona shows the divide in the Mexican society, and how the class system plays an important part in the success and happiness of these characters. The film raises questions about social and political aspects in Mexico.

== Reception ==
On review aggregator website Rotten Tomatoes, the film holds an approval rating of 79% based on 19 reviews, with an average rating of 6.7/10.

== Awards ==
- Venice Film Festival: Luigi De Laurentiis Award 2007 (Rodrigo Plá)
- Golden Ariel for best supporting actor 2008 (Mario Zaragoza)
- Golden India Catalina for best cinematography 2008 (Emiliano Villanueva)
- Sant Jordi Award for best Spanish actress 2008 (Maribel Verdú)
- Spanish actors union: newcomer award, male 2008 (Carlos Bardem)
- Toronto International Film Festival: International Critics' Award (FIPRESCI) 2008 (Rodrigo Plá)

== See also ==
- List of films featuring surveillance
