= Raúl Briones =

Mexican actor

Raúl Briones Carmona is a Mexican actor.

== Life and career ==
Raúl Briones Carmona was born in Cuajimalpa de Morelos, Mexico City, but was raised in San Cosme Xaloztoc, Tlaxcala, since age 10. He graduated from the UNAM's Centro Universitario de Teatro (CUT). He gained a degree of public recognition for his portrayal of goalkeeper Pepe "Pepenador" in television series Club de Cuervos. His portrayal of Bernie in Asfixia (2019) won him the Ariel Award for Best Supporting Actor.

In 2021, he played A Cop Movie the role of veteran Mexico City police officer Montoya, for which he earned the Ariel Award for Best Actor.

He won an Ariel Award for Best Supporting Actor for Northern Skies Over Empty Space.

In 2025, he played Vicente Lombardo Toledano in the historical film 1938: When Mexico Recovered Its Oil directed by Sergio Olhovich, and played in the cast of the anthology film The Follies directed by Rodrigo García.

In September 2025, at the 67th Ariel Awards, he won his second Ariel Award for Best Actor for his role as Pedro in the comedy-drama La cocina.
