= J. Karen Thomas =

American actress and singer

- Born: 1965; Nashville, Tennessee, USA
- Died: March 26, 2015 (aged 50); Nashville, Tennessee, USA
- Occupation: Actress / Singer / Songwriter / Voice Artist
- Years active: 1983–2015
- Spouse: Colette Divine

J. Karen Thomas (1965 – March 26, 2015) was an American actress, singer, and voice artist. Her numerous television credits included her role as Audrey Carlisle on the dramatic television series, Nashville. Other television roles included recurring roles and guest appearances on Drop Dead Diva, The Ellen Show and Criminal Minds. Thomas' cinematic credits included The Identical (2014), Captive (2015), and a co-starring role in the 2014 film, Boulevard, which was shot in her native Nashville, opposite Robin Williams.

Thomas was born in Nashville, Tennessee, and graduated from Memphis State University, now known as the University of Memphis. During the mid to late 80's, she was the midday DJ at popular Nashville radio station WYHY, Y107 (now WRVW, 107.5 The River). She was a valuable member of the Nashville theater community. In 2013, Thomas won the Circle Award for Best Supporting Actress for her portrayal of Shug Avery in The Color Purple. She also released two albums during her career.

Thomas’s partner for 18 years was Colette Divine. Thomas was diagnosed with multiple myeloma in January 2015 and died from the disease on March 26, 2015, at the age of 50.
