= Sand Sharks =

- Promotional release poster
- Directed by: Mark Atkins
- Screenplay by: Cameron Larson
- Story by: Cameron Larson; Joe Benkis
- Produced by: Courtney Brin; Dana Dubovsky; Anthony Fankhauser; Gina Holden; Cameron Larson; Mark L. Lester; Corin Nemec; Stan Spry; Scott Wheeler; Eric Scott Woods
- Starring: Corin Nemec; Brooke Hogan; Vanessa Lee Evigan; Eric Scott Woods; Gina Holden; Hilary Cruz; Julie Marie Berman; Jack Kennedy; Roberto Aguire
- Cinematography: Mark Atkins
- Edited by: Sean Cain
- Music by: Mario Salvucci
- Production companies: Little Dragon; Remember Dreaming; Rogue State; The Cartel
- Distributed by: American World Pictures
- Release date: September 16, 2011
- Running time: 88 minutes
- Country: United States
- Language: English

Sand Sharks is a 2011 American direct-to-video horror film directed by Mark Atkins about a horde of monstrous sharks that swim through sand and hunt people. It stars Corin Nemec (from Stargate SG-1), Brooke Hogan, Vanessa Lee Evigan, Eric Scott Woods, and Gina Holden.

== Plot ==
Two people on dirt bikes are riding on the beach, but are then attacked by a predator in the sand. Meanwhile, Jimmy Green (Corin Nemec) the son of the Mayor (Edgar Allan Poe IV) of the small island town of White Sands returns home to throw a party. At the same time the local sheriff John Stone (Eric Scott Woods) is investigating the deaths of the men from earlier believing it to be a murder. Years prior to the events John's wife and child along with 13 other people were murdered in a shark fling at a party Jimmy threw and doesn't believe they are dealing with it again. John's sister, Deputy Brenda Stone (Vanessa Evigan), contacts a shark expert against her brother's wishes.

A couple is devoured by a sand shark and on the other side of the beach as Jimmy is preparing for a layout with Willie (Delpaneaux Wills), Erin (Hilary Cruz) and Amanda Gore (Gina Holden) is confronted by John and Brenda (the latter had a previous fling with Jimmy and is not happy to see him). Just then, a couple having fun on the beach are both attacked by a sand shark causing panic.

At a town meeting, the locals can't afford to have the beaches closed as the town is already in a financial crisis. A man named Angus McSorely (Robert Pike Daniel) tells them they are dealing with actual sand sharks that can swim through sand and offers to take care of them for the town, but is written off as crazy. Sandy Powers (Brooke Hogan), the shark expert Brenda called, was watching the meeting and has a talk with John while examining a shark tooth.

At night two men are being stalked by a sand shark while on their raft in the water. They try to escape but the shark moves on land and devours them. Fearing his party may be cancelled, Jimmy calls someone to bring an already dead shark but because the tooth found does not match the dead shark, the beach must stay closed.

After a power outage caused by the shark, Brenda arrests Jimmy and we learn of their relationship from before the film's events. They spot John on the beach with three guys at gun point as one of them brought a fake shark to fool him into keeping the beaches open. After seeing a dorsal fin moving in the sand they all realize the old man was right. Sparky (Jack Kennedy) who brought the fake shark does not hear the others telling him to get off the sand as he was trying to get the power back on and is killed by the shark who ultimately dies after chomping on the electrical cable causing it to explode and turn to glass.

With the threat gone the beaches are reopen and the party is back on. However the tooth found earlier is only a baby tooth and Sandy believes the dead shark's mother is out there looking for its baby. With the party underway it is revealed there are more sand sharks as both Amanda and Willie are killed by one. More sand sharks appear and start killing the party goers and Brenda is also killed trying to get people off the beach. John and Sandy are stuck on rocks where the sharks can't get to them and the sharks attack the docks with few casualties as Angus shows up to get the people out of there. With the ferry not showing up for another day, Jimmy, John, Angus and Sandy take one final stand against the sand sharks using Jimmy's speakers, napalm and Angus' homemade flamethrower. Unfortunately, the music stops and Jimmy goes to fix the speakers but the wire is torn and the sand sharks swarm Jimmy, who sacrifices himself so the sharks stay in one place as Angus encases them all in glass.

With the sand sharks now encased in glass, the threat appears to be gone, but a large dorsal fin is seen moving in the sand in the cliff above. The mother of the sand sharks bursts through the side and eats Angus. Trapped in Angus' hut John and Sandy make one last effort to kill the mother by tossing a flamethrower full of napalm into her mouth. As they escape the hut, the flamethrower explodes, destroying the shark and the hut at the same time. Back at the trailer where Erin was hiding after a shark killed Willie in front of her, she is talking to someone who wants to throw a beach party, but is killed by the same shark that ate Willie as it was waiting for her the entire time, hinting that the threat is not over.

== Cast ==
- Corin Nemec as Jimmy Green
- Brooke Hogan as Sandy Powers
- Vanessa Lee Evigan as Brenda Stone
- Eric Scott Woods as Sheriff John Stone
- Gina Holden as Amanda Gore
- Hilary Cruz as Erin
- Julie Marie Berman as Nikki
- Jack Kennedy as "Sparky"
- Roberto Aguire as Rex
- Edgar Allan Poe IV as Mayor Greenburg
- Robert Pike Daniel as Angus McSorely
- Delpaneaux Wills as Willie
- Andrea Pineda as Grace
- Aiden Simko as Marty
- Nicole Zeoli as Taylor
- Jeff Jonas as Earl
- Zachariah Jay as Ray
- Christina Corigliano as Carly
- Daegan Palermo as Bob
- Jordann Kimley as Peter
- Lauren Roehm as Kerri
- Jesse La Flair as Nikki's Boyfriend

== Release ==
Sand Sharks was released on DVD in the United Kingdom on January 9, 2012.

== Reception ==
Reviewing the film, Vicky Renee Johnson of HorrorNews.net felt the ending, acting and CGI effects were poor, but despite this enjoyed the film, giving it 3 out of 5 overall. Becky Bartlett of the London FrightFest Film Festival was more negative, describing the acting as "wooden to histrionic" and noting that "While it fails on almost every level regarding directing, budget, screen-writing, plot, acting, cinematography and effects, it manages to be surprisingly entertaining". S. Cockwell of eatmybrains.com found the overuse of puns and one-liners irritating but noted that the "wilfully, cheerfully dumb" film was enjoyable in places. Sand Sharks was rated one of the ten most ridiculous shark films by Virgin Media.

== See also ==
- List of killer shark films
- Tremors
