= La niña de la mina =

- Directed by: Jorge Eduardo Ramírez
- Written by: Ricardo Zárate Flores
- Produced by: Jorge Eduardo Ramírez
- Starring: Regina Blandón; José Ángel Bichir; Gerardo Taracena; Eugenio Bartilotti
- Cinematography: Marc Bellver
- Edited by: Sam Baixauli
- Music by: Rodrigo Flores López
- Production company: Leow Films
- Distributed by: Videocine
- Release date: July 1, 2016
- Running time: 80 minutes
- Country: Mexico
- Language: Spanish

La niña de la mina is a Mexican horror movie directed by Jorge Eduardo Ramirez and starring Regina Blandon, Gerardo Taracena and José Ángel Bichir.

== Synopsis ==
After a tourist disappears inside a mine in Guanajuato, Mat Medina a young expert in mine engineering is hired to make a security diagnostic in the mines of a big company.

== Production ==
The movie was filmed in the mines "El nopal", "San Vicente" and "Peñafiel", in the Villa Marín Cristina Hotel and in the Historic Center of Guanajuato. In the city of León filming was in the San Juan plaza, on Madero Street, and in the Center Medical School. In Mexico City filming was at a university. The shooting of the film and post-production lasted 6 weeks.

== Cast ==
- José Ángel Bichir as Mateo Medina.
- Regina Blandon as Sara Sanromán.
- Gerardo Taracena as Carlos.
- Eugenio Bartilotti as Jaime.
- Ruy Senderos as Ricardo "Ricky".
- Victor Huggo Martín as Hamilton.
- Paola Galina as Karen.
- Bárbara Islas as Pamela.
- Andrea Verdeja as Ana.
- Fernanda Sasse as Niña.
- Daniel Martinez as Kaplan.
- Álvaro Sagone as Forense.
