= Betty en NY =

American telenovela

- Genre: Telenovela; Romantic comedy
- Based on: Yo soy Betty, la fea by Fernando Gaitán
- Screenplay by: Alejandro Vergara; Patricia Rodríguez; Luis Miguel Martínez; Valentina Parraga; Sandra Velasco
- Directed by: Gustavo Loza; Fez Noriega; Ricardo Schwarz; Luis Manzo
- Starring: Elyfer Torres; Erick Elías; Sabrina Seara; Aarón Díaz; Héctor Suárez Gomís; César Bono; Alma Delfina; Jeimy Osorio; Sylvia Sáenz; Saúl Lisazo
- Theme music composer: Francisco Canaro; Ivo Pelay
- Opening theme: "Yo soy así"
- Country of origin: United States
- Original language: Spanish
- No. of seasons: 1
- No. of episodes: 123

Production
- Executive producers: Miguel Varoni; Marcos Santana
- Producer: Minú Chacín
- Editor: Ellery Albarran
- Camera setup: Multi-camera
- Production company: Telemundo Global Studios

Original release
- Network: Telemundo
- Release: 6 February – 12 August 2019

Betty en NY (pronounced Betty en New York or Nueva York), is an American telenovela produced by Telemundo Global Studios for Telemundo based on the 1999 Colombian telenovela written by Fernando Gaitán, Yo soy Betty, la fea. The series stars Elyfer Torres as the titular character. It premiered on 6 February 2019 and ended on 12 August 2019.

== Plot ==
The series revolves around Beatriz Aurora Rincón Lozano, an intelligent and capable young Mexican woman who lives in New York City who goes after her dreams, overcoming prejudices in a world where image is everything. After suffering six months of rejection in all jobs that she applies due to her lack of physical attractiveness, Betty decides to accept a job far below her abilities. Thus, after entering the sophisticated fashion company V&M Fashion, she becomes the personal secretary of the company president. Although she is ridiculed and humiliated on a daily basis for being completely lacking in style, Betty is more than willing to not be defeated in this ruthless war of appearances. While she is extremely competent and has great plans for personal growth, none of her many qualities will be able to help Betty find true love.

== Cast ==
=== Main ===
- Elyfer Torres as Beatriz "Betty" Aurora Rincón
- Erick Elías as Armando Mendoza
- Sabrina Seara as Marcela Valencia
- Aarón Díaz as Ricardo Calderón
- Héctor Suárez Gomís as Hugo Lombardi
- César Bono as Demetrio Rincón
- Alma Delfina as Julia Lozano de Rincón
- Jeimy Osorio as Mariana González
- Sylvia Sáenz as Patricia Fernández
- Saúl Lisazo as Roberto Mendoza
- Mauricio Garza as Nicolás Ramos
- Sheyla Tadeo as Bertha Vargas
- Isabel Moreno as Inés "Inesita" Sandoval
- Amaranta Ruiz as Sofía Peña
- Mauricio Henao as Fabio
- Gloria Peralta as Margarita del Valle de Mendoza
- Pepe Suárez as Efraín Montes
- Verónica Schneider as Catalina Escarpa
- Rodolfo Salas as Daniel Valencia
- Freddy Flórez as Giovanni Castañeda
- Candela Márquez as Jenny Wendy Reyes
- Daniela Tapia as Aura María Andrade
- Jaime Aymerich as Charly Godines
- Polo Monárrez as Wilson Cuauhtémoc Márquez
- Valeria Vera as Sandra Fuentes
- Rykardo Hernández as Gregorio Mata
- Paloma Márquez as María Lucía Valencia
- Jimmie Bernal as Raymond Smith
- Michelle Taurel as Karla
- Gabriel Coronel as Nacho
- Fred Valle as Steve Parker
- Karen Carreño as Naomi Ferreti
- Suzy Herrera as Deisy
- Carl Mergenthaler as Mr. Anderson
- Salim Rubiales as Peter
- Sofía Reca as Romina
- Jorge Consejo as Frank
- Daniela Botero as Vanessa Palacios
- Laura Garrido as Cindy Anderson
- Willy Martin as Elvis
- Saúl Mendoza as Andrés
- Ángelo Jamaica as Manuel
- Santiago Jiménez as Ramón
- Noah Rico as Efraín Jr. Montes
- Martín Fajardo as Jonathan Montes
- Bernard Bullen as Joaquin de Quiroz

=== Guest stars ===
- Shannon de Lima as herself
- Jorge Enrique Abello as Armando Mendoza
- Gaby Espino as herself
- Valentina Ferrer as herself

== Production ==
The trailer of the series was presented as Betty in NY, during the Telemundo's upfronts for the 2018–2019 television season. Filming of the series began on 27 November 2018, and concluded on 1 June 2019.

== Reception ==
=== Ratings ===
Viewership and ratings per season of Betty en NY
Season	Timeslot (ET)	Episodes	First aired		Last aired		Avg. viewers (millions)
Season	Timeslot (ET)	Episodes	Date	Viewers (millions)	Date	Viewers (millions)	Avg. viewers (millions)
1	Mon–Fri 9:00 p.m.	123	6 February 2019	1.37	12 August 2019	1.74	1.38

=== Critical reception ===
Following the initial episode, Concepción de León opined in the New York Times that the closeness of the adaption to the Colombian original left it feeling out of date, with its treatment of the main character verging on "cruel", as it failed to take into account societal changes over the last two decades.

Ahead of its release in Mexico, Álvaro Cueva of Milenio praised Betty en NY by stating, "Betty en NY is a treat for the soul, the most endearing reminder of the charm of the Latin American telenovela, a tribute to the first Betty but also for those of us who have loved serialized melodramas since we were born."

=== Awards and nominations ===
Year	Award	Category	Nominated	Result	Ref
2019	Produ Awards	Best Telenovela	Betty en NY	Nominated	
2019	Produ Awards	Best Program Theme Song	"Yo soy así"	Nominated	
2019	Produ Awards	Best Producer	Miguel Varoni	Nominated	
2019	Produ Awards	Best Lead Actor	Erick Elías	Nominated	
2019	Produ Awards	Best Newcomer Actress	Elyfer Torres	Won	
2019	Produ Awards	Best Content Release Strategy	Betty en NY	Nominated	
2020	Latin ACE Awards	Best Featured Actor	Héctor Suárez Gomís	Won	
2020	Latin ACE Awards	Best Featured Actress	Isabel Moreno	Won	
