= De brutas, nada =

Mexican web comedy television series

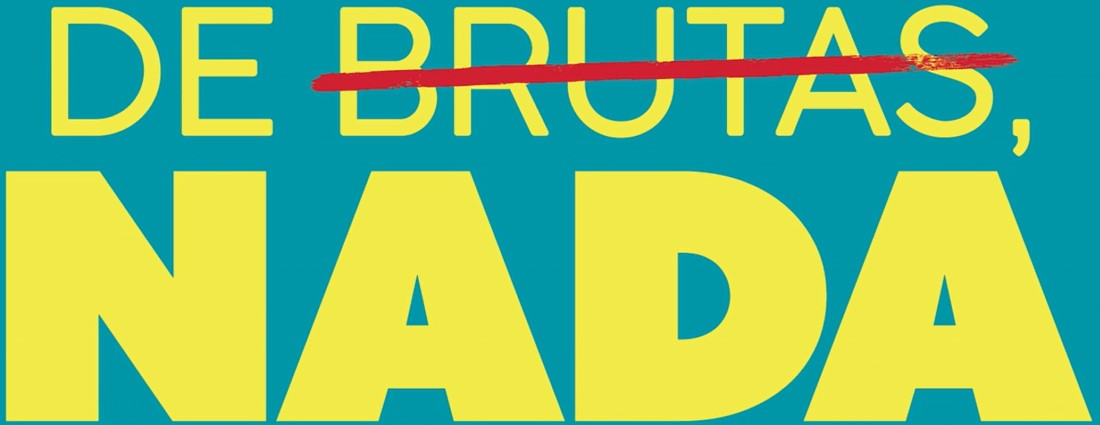
- Genre: Comedy drama
- Created by: Isabella Santodomingo
- Based on: "Los caballeros las prefieren brutas" by Isabella Santodomingo
- Written by: Rosa Clemente García; Raúl Prieto Muñoz; Connie Acosta Rodado; Andrea Ortega-Lee; Héctor Orbegoso Rivera; Valentina Pollarolo; Olfa Masmoudi; Daniel Jiménez
- Directed by: Rolando Ocampo; María Gamboa
- Starring: Tessa Ía; Christian Vázquez; Marimar Vega; José Pablo Minor; Carolina Ramírez; Oswaldo Zárate; Julián Román; Diana Bovio
- Theme music composer: Julieta Venegas
- Opening theme: "Ese camino" by Julieta Venegas
- Composer: Carlos Agüera
- Country of origin: Mexico
- Original language: Spanish
- No. of seasons: 3
- No. of episodes: 30

Production
- Executive producers: Alejandro García; Ana Bond; Rafa Lara; Néstor Hernández
- Producer: Agustín Restrepo
- Editor: John Casas
- Production company: Sony Pictures Television

Original release
- Network: Amazon Prime Video
- Release: 6 November 2020 – 18 January 2023

De brutas, nada is a Mexican comedy-drama television series produced by Sony Pictures Television, based on a screenplay by Isabella Santodomingo. The series stars Tessa Ía and Christian Vázquez, with an ensemble cast composed mostly by Marimar Vega, José Pablo Minor, Carolina Ramírez, and Julián Román. The first season of the series premiered on 6 November 2020 on Amazon Prime Video. The second season was released on 15 January 2021. The third season premiered on 18 January 2023.

== Plot ==
The plot revolves around Cristina (Tessa Ía), a young woman who is about to marry, but suddenly discovers that her fiancé cheated on her with another woman. Now living alone in her apartment, Cristina decides to undertake a search for a new roomie. Alejandro (Christian Vázquez) is a single man who is looking for a new place to live and meets Cristina, who he suddenly falls in love with, but out of fear he decides to make her believe he is gay.

== Cast ==
=== Main ===
- Tessa Ía as Cristina Oviedo
- Christian Vázquez as Alejandro Montero
- Marimar Vega as Esther Duarte
- José Pablo Minor as Rodrigo Alberto Flores
- Carolina Ramírez as Hannah Larrea
- Oswaldo Zárate as Miguel Sánchez
- Julián Román as Guillermo Roble
- Diana Bovio as Graciela Oviedo

=== Guest stars ===
- Gonzalo García Vivanco as Eduardo
- Carmenza González as Doña Martha (Martita)

== Episodes ==
=== Series overview ===
| Series | Episodes | Originally released |
|---|---|---|
| 1 | 9 | 6 November 2020 |
| 2 | 11 | 15 January 2021 |
| 3 | 10 | 18 January 2023 |

=== Season 1 (2020) ===
| No. overall | No. in season | Title | Original release date |
|---|---|---|---|
| 1 | 1 | "El roomie" | 6 November 2020 |
| 2 | 2 | "El día que no fue" | 6 November 2020 |
| 3 | 3 | "Yo puedo sola" | 6 November 2020 |
| 4 | 4 | "Corazones rotos" | 6 November 2020 |
| 5 | 5 | "Amigos con derechos" | 6 November 2020 |
| 6 | 6 | "¿Celosa yo?" | 6 November 2020 |
| 7 | 7 | "El beso" | 6 November 2020 |
| 8 | 8 | "La incómoda verdad" | 6 November 2020 |
| 9 | 9 | "Lo que pasó anoche" | 6 November 2020 |

=== Season 2 (2021) ===
| No. overall | No. in season | Title | Original release date |
|---|---|---|---|
| 10 | 1 | "Retiro de paz" | 15 January 2021 |
| 11 | 2 | "Sexo, mentiras y sin video" | 15 January 2021 |
| 12 | 3 | "Reglas de convivencia" | 15 January 2021 |
| 13 | 4 | "Double Date" | 15 January 2021 |
| 14 | 5 | "La inauguración" | 15 January 2021 |
| 15 | 6 | "Terrible destiempo" | 15 January 2021 |
| 16 | 7 | "Gente de más" | 15 January 2021 |
| 17 | 8 | "El deseo de cumpleaños" | 15 January 2021 |
| 18 | 9 | "Sexo, libros y niños" | 15 January 2021 |
| 19 | 10 | "Nada oculto bajo el sol" | 15 January 2021 |
| 20 | 11 | "Las que pueden y la que no puede" | 15 January 2021 |

=== Season 3 (2023) ===
| No. overall | No. in season | Title | Original release date |
|---|---|---|---|
| 21 | 1 | "Todos somos uno" | 18 January 2023 |
| 22 | 2 | "Madre hay una sola" | 18 January 2023 |
| 23 | 3 | "Un shot de realidad" | 18 January 2023 |
| 24 | 4 | "El shock" | 18 January 2023 |
| 25 | 5 | "Me, Myself and I" | 18 January 2023 |
| 26 | 6 | "Freedom" | 18 January 2023 |
| 27 | 7 | "De vuelta al mercado" | 18 January 2023 |
| 28 | 8 | "Mariposa traicionera" | 18 January 2023 |
| 29 | 9 | "Amor a la mexicana" | 18 January 2023 |
| 30 | 10 | "What Is Love" | 18 January 2023 |

== Production ==
The filming of the series began on 5 September 2019, and consists of two seasons, the first season having a total of 9 episodes and the second a total of 11 episodes. Filming of the third season began in September 2021.
