= No Fear of Truth =

- Sin miedo a la verdad
- Created by: Rubén Galindo; Marcelo Strupini
- Screenplay by: Celia Kim; Carolina Mata; Raúl Olivares; Itzel Lara
- Directed by: Carlos González; Silvia Tort; Jacopo Fontana; Julio César Estrada; Fez Noriega; Carlos Jaramillo
- Starring: Alex Perea
- Opening theme: "Mala Mía" by Maluma
- Country of origin: Mexico
- Original language: Spanish
- No. of seasons: 3
- No. of episodes: 81 (list of episodes)

Production
- Executive producer: Rubén Galindo

Original release
- Network: Las Estrellas
- Release: 8 October 2018 – 24 April 2020

Sin miedo a la verdad (English: No Fear of Truth) is a Mexican television series that premiered on 8 October 2018 on Las Estrellas. The series is produced by Rubén Galindo for Televisa and stars Alex Perea. The first season consists of 21 episodes.

The series revolves around Manu, an urban hero, who has a vlog that he uses anonymously, under the pseudonym "Gus", with which he identifies himself to protect those who have been victims of various kinds of injustice.

== Seasons ==
| Season | Title | Episodes | Originally released | |
| Season | Title | Episodes | First released | Last released |
|---|---|---|---|---|
| 1 | You Are No Longer Alone | 21 | 8 October 2018 | 2 November 2018 |
| 2 | Wake Up | 25 | 8 July 2019 | 9 August 2019 |
| 3 | Time to Rise Again | 35 | 9 March 2020 | 24 April 2020 |

=== Ya no estás solo (2018) ===
Manu is an introverted man with special abilities, not only to repair cell phones, but to violate systems and passwords. Thanks to Doña Cata, his mentor, he has managed to survive hidden from a cruel past that still haunts him, leaving a terrible shadow in his soul and marking on his face. Manu works in the Plaza de la Computación, where they repair, adjust and get any kind of electronic devices and the only way Manu has to deal with the pain his past causes him is, helping others, so that through his vlog "Sin miedo a la verdad", he will be who anonymously protects those who have been victims of some injustice. As Manu goes about solving cases, he is persecuted by devil policeman Horacio, a corrupt cop, main perpetrator and responsible for the murder of Manu and Estefani's father, who wants to take revenge on Manu for killing his rapist brother and dirty cop.

=== Despierta (2019) ===
After being in a coma for three months and after discovering that his sister Estéfani is alive and is "El Chaka", Manu wakes up and realizes that he has a bullet in his head. Manu tries to recover, when he learns that Bere left him and his vlog "Sin miedo a la verdad" has been hacked by someone who charges in exchange for helping people. Manu will have to flee from an increasingly powerful mafia cop Horacio, look for his sister, find the truth behind the disappearance of Bere and discover the secret that Lety hides, who will continue trying to recover his love. Doña Cata, as always, will remain his unconditional ally, along with Chicho and Genaro.

== Cast ==
- Alex Perea as Manuel "Manu" Montero
- Dacia González as Catalina Gómez
- Tania Niebla as Berenice Hidalgo
- Ligia Uriarte as Lety
- Fermín Martínez as Horacio
- Israel Islas as Isidro
- Paola Miguel as María José Hidalgo
- Arturo Nahum as Alberto Gómez "Pila"
- Carlos Barragán as Cuauhtémoc Sánchez "El Bolillo"
- Ana Cristina Rubio as Estefani Montero
- Catalina López as Amanda
- Víctor Cerveira as Chicho
- Eugenio Montessoro as Alfredo Alonso
- Jackie Sauza as Andrea Loera (season 2–present)

== Production ==
On 4 November 2018, Televisa renewed the series for a second season. Filming of the second season began on 8 March 2019.

On 16 January 2020, two actors, Jorge Navarro Sánchez and Luis Gerardo Rivera, died after falling from a bridge during filming near Mexico City.

== Ratings ==
Viewership and ratings per season of No Fear of Truth
| Season | Episodes | First aired | | Last aired | | Avg. viewers (millions) |
| Season | Episodes | Date | Viewers (millions) | Date | Viewers (millions) | Avg. viewers (millions) |
|---|---|---|---|---|---|---|
| 1 | 21 | 8 October 2018 | 3.7 | 4 November 2018 | 3.4 | 3.11 |
| 2 | 24 | 8 July 2019 | 3.0 | 9 August 2019 | 3.3 | 2.91 |
| 3 | 35 | 9 March 2020 | 3.2 | 24 April 2020 | 3.6 | 3.16 |

== Awards and nominations ==
| Year | Award | Category | Nominated | Result |
|---|---|---|---|---|
| 2019 | TVyNovelas Awards | Best Unit Program | Rubén Galindo | Nominated |
| 2020 | TVyNovelas Awards | Best Drama Series | Rubén Galindo | Nominated |
| 2020 | TVyNovelas Awards | Best Actress in a Drama Series | Ligia Uriarte | Nominated |
| 2020 | TVyNovelas Awards | Best Actor in a Drama Series | Alex Perea | Won |
