= 1938: When Mexico Recovered Its Oil =

- Theatrical release poster
- Spanish: 1938: Cuando el petróleo fue nuestro
- Literally: 1938: When the oil was ours
- Directed by: Sergio Olhovich
- Written by: Sergio Olhovich; Carlos Montemayor
- Produced by: Javier Colinas; Roberto Fiesco; Mario Guerrero García; Sergio Olhovich; Iliana Reyes; Eckehardt Von Damm
- Starring: Ianis Guerrero
- Cinematography: Arturo de la Rosa
- Music by: Tomás Barreiro
- Production companies: Corazón Films; Katarsis Cooperativa de Comunicación
- Release dates: March 18, 2025 (Cineteca Nacional); March 20, 2025 (Mexico)
- Running time: 100 minutes
- Country: Mexico
- Languages: Spanish; English

1938: When Mexico Recovered Its Oil (Spanish: 1938: Cuando el petróleo fue nuestro, lit. '1938: When the oil was ours') is a 2025 Mexican historical drama film co-written, co-produced and directed by Sergio Olhovich. It stars Ianis Guerrero as President Lázaro Cárdenas, who faces the decision to expropriate the oil industry while powerful foreign companies try to prevent it.

== Synopsis ==
In 1938, President Lázaro Cárdenas faced the most difficult decision of his term: to expropriate the oil industry. Powerful foreign companies were unwilling to allow this; the decision also required compensating them to avoid a major international conflict. It was at this point that the Mexican people united to contribute whatever they could to ensure the return of oil to the nation.

== Cast ==
The actors participating in this film are:

- Ianis Guerrero as Lázaro Cárdenas
- Ofelia Medina as Amalia Solórzano
  - Karen Martí as Young Amalia Solórzano
- Baltimore Beltrán as Francisco José Múgica
- Roberto Beck as Raúl Castellanos Jiménez
- Julian Sedgwick as Josephus Daniels
- Jon Roberts as August Armstrong
- María Penella Gómez as Rosaura
- Viridiana Robles as Alicia Cárdenas
- Salvador Sánchez as Peasant
- Esteban Soberanes as Engineer Rojas
- Raúl Briones as Vicente Lombardo Toledano
- Fermín Martínez as Benito Juárez
- Mauro González as Gardener
- Dave Collins as Anderson
- Israel Almanza as Radio technician
- Salvador Alvarez as Announcer
- Irving Aranda as Photographer
- Raúl Barranco as Simón
- Steven Destello as Williams
- Nelly González as Frida
- Héctor Holten as Valente
- Elena Gore as Bride

== Production ==
The film took 20 years to produce. Sergio Olhovich and Carlos Montemayor wrote a 300-page script, which was cut to 120 pages by Olhovich alone after Montemayor's death. Principal photography began in October 2021 at Mexico's National Palace and ended in May 2022.

== Release ==
The film had its world premiere on March 18, 2025, at the Cineteca Nacional, followed by a wide national theatrical release on March 20. It was subsequently screened on April 18, 2025, at the 47th Moscow International Film Festival.
