= Mirreyes contra Godínez: Las Vegas =

- Theatrical release poster
- Directed by: Chava Cartas
- Written by: Juan Carlos Garzón; Angélica Gudiño; Maria Hinojos; María Remírez Valenzuela
- Produced by: Ruth Cherem Daniel; Paco Cossio; Francisco González Compeán
- Starring: Regina Blandón; Daniel Tovar; Diana Bovio; Michelle Rodríguez; Christian Vázquez
- Cinematography: Beto Casillas
- Edited by: Alberto J. Baixauli; Sam Baixauli
- Music by: Rodrigo Dávila; Salvador Güereña
- Production companies: Draco Films; Liam Labs; Caesars Entertainment
- Distributed by: Videocine
- Release date: August 14, 2025
- Running time: 90 minutes
- Country: Mexico
- Language: Spanish

Mirreyes contra Godínez: Las Vegas (lit. 'Mirreyes vs. Godínez: Las Vegas') is a 2025 Mexican comedy film directed by Chava Cartas. It is the third installment of the Mirreyes contra Godínez film saga. Once again, it stars Regina Blandón, Daniel Tovar, Diana Bovio, Michelle Rodríguez and Christian Vázquez accompanied by Alejandro de Marino, Roberto Aguire and Gloria Stalina.

== Synopsis ==
When the Mirreyes and Godínez's shoe store is in danger, Genaro, Mich, and the rest of the gang travel to Las Vegas Valley to secure a contract to save the business. However, the city's vicious nature puts the gang's love, respect, and friendship at risk.

== Cast ==
- Regina Blandón as Mich
- Daniel Tovar as Genaro
- Diana Bovio as Nancy
- Michelle Rodríguez as Goyita
- Christian Vázquez as Conan
- Alejandro de Marino as Shimón
- Roberto Aguire as Rich
- Gloria Stalina as Sofía
- Isabella Castillo as Elvira
- David Chocarro as Luca
- Carlos Ballarta as El Tímido
- Cassandra Sánchez Navarro as Srta. Garza
- Roshan Mathews as Rashid
- Corbin Timbrook as Colton
- Jeff Pearson as Aces Assassin
- Valentina Mami as Reguetonera
- Emilio Dávalos as Wizard
- Luiza Khachaturyan as Store
- Natalia Ávila as Gen Z
- Chema Rivera as Alexis
- Kelsey Kummerl as Sandy
- Cecilia De La Cueva as Viridiana
- Harry Shahoian as Elvis
- Mikel Martínez Iturbide as Panchito David
- Brent Reesha as Officer Anderson
- Vanessa Lizanne as Reportera
- Nastassia Villasana as Viuda Lecumberri
- Dae Seo as Bartender
- Roberto Kwok as Jugador 1
- Alfredo Ang as Jugador 2
- Melissa Lee as Jugadora
- Luis Enrique Cota as Croupier Clandestino
- Mike Charette as Gerente
- Natali Tangherlini as Concierge Caesars Palace
- Jay Clay as Seguridad Pool Party
- Daniel Bateman as Mesero Casino Caesars Palace
- Diego Rascon as Caesars Palace Croupier
- Kevin J. Drouin as Seguridad Pool Party VIP
- Alejandra Rodriguez as Mesera Bar
- Nathan L. Scott as Policía Las Vegas
- James Scott as Seguridad Casino
- Jose Manuel Schivy as Escolta Aces Assassin
- Adam Clinton as Drunk Guy Pool Party
- Genesis Williams as Pool DJ
- Chava Cartas as Turista Vegas
- Kimberly Quinart as Lady In The Bathroom
- Oscar Mañon as Don Santino
- Belén De Armero Lopez as Azafata
- Andres Pepz as Reguetonero
- Alexander Garganera as Bell Boy
- Mary Zema as Toga Party Guest

== Production ==
Principal photography took place at night in Mexico and Las Vegas Valley locations such as Caesars Palace.

== Release ==
The film was released on August 14, 2025, in Mexican theaters.
