= Roberto Aguire =

Mexican actor

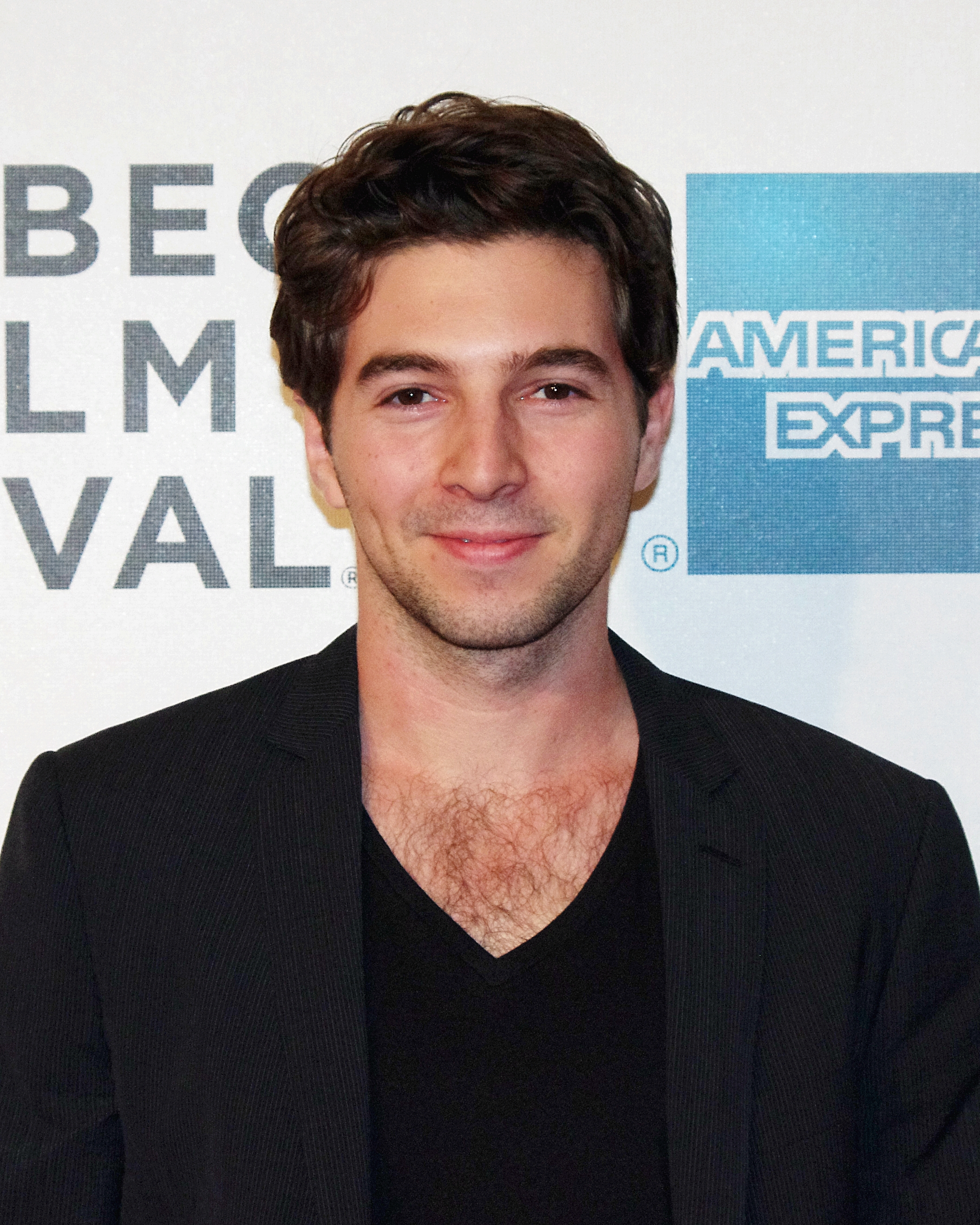
- Aguire at the 2012 Tribeca Film Festival premiere of Struck by Lightning
- Born: Mexico City, Mexico, MX
- Education: New York University
- Occupations: Actor and producer

Roberto Aguire (born 1988) is a Mexican actor and producer. His first major film role was in the 2012 film Struck by Lightning, in which he played the character of Emillio. In 2014, he starred opposite Robin Williams as a troubled young street hustler named Leo in the film Boulevard.

== Personal life ==
Aguire was born in Mexico City to Mexican parents and was subsequently raised in Switzerland before going on to study at Georgetown University and New York University's Tisch School of the Arts. While at NYU, Aguire was roommates with fellow actor Ritesh Rajan. As of 2013, he resides in Los Angeles. Since 2017 he resides in Mexico.

== Filmography ==
=== Film ===
Year	Title	Role	Notes
2011	Sand Sharks	Rex	Direct-to-video
2012	Struck by Lightning	Emilio	Also producer
2013	After Darkness	Fred Beaty	
2013	Redemption	Cop	
2014	Boulevard	Leo	
2015	The Morning After	Diego	
2019	Mirreyes contra Godínez	Ricardo	
2022	Mirreyes contra Godínez 2: El retiro	Ricardo	
2025	Mirreyes contra Godínez: Las Vegas	Rich	

=== Television ===
Year	Title	Role	Notes
2014–15	NCIS: New Orleans	Orion	2 episodes
2016	Pretty Little Liars	Liam Greene	6 episodes Recurring role (Season 6) Guest star (Season 7)
2016	Lethal Weapon	Dylan Ashworth	1 episode
2019	Too Old to Die Young	Miguel	2 episodes
