= The Follies =

- Netflix release poster
- Directed by: Rodrigo García
- Written by: Rodrigo García
- Produced by: Pablo Zimbrón Alva; Gerardo Gatica González
- Starring: Naian González Norvind; Adriana Barraza; Ilse Salas; Cassandra Ciangherotti; Mónica del Carmen; Raúl Briones; Natalia Solián; Alfredo Castro; Fernando Cattori; Fernanda Castillo; Daniel Tovar; Ángeles Cruz; Juanki Durán
- Cinematography: Igor Jadue-Lillo
- Production company: Panorama Global
- Distributed by: Pimienta Films (Mexico); Netflix (Worldwide)
- Release dates: September 18, 2025 (Mexico); November 20, 2025 (Netflix)
- Running time: 121 minutes
- Country: Mexico
- Language: Spanish

The Follies (Spanish: Las locuras) is a 2025 Mexican anthology drama film written and directed by Rodrigo García. It follows a series of people pushed to their limits as they rebel against confinement, self-censorship, and family pressure. The cast is made up of Naian González Norvind, Adriana Barraza, Ilse Salas, Cassandra Ciangherotti, Mónica del Carmen, Raúl Briones, Natalia Solián, Alfredo Castro, Fernando Cattori, Fernanda Castillo, Daniel Tovar, Ángeles Cruz and Juanki Durán.

== Plot ==
A series of stories unfold in Mexico City that embrace the intensity and authenticity of human emotions when pushed to the limit, exploring the challenges of family expectations, social pressures, freedom, courage, and the imposition of self-censorship.

== Cast ==
- Naian González Norvind as Penélope
- Adriana Barraza as Irene
- Ilse Salas as Miranda
- Cassandra Ciangherotti as Renata
- Mónica del Carmen
- Raúl Briones
- Natalia Solián
- Alfredo Castro
- Fernando Cattori as Valentín
- Fernanda Castillo
- Daniel Tovar
- Ángeles Cruz as Irlanda
- Juanki Durán as Uber Driver

== Release ==
The film had a limited theatrical release on September 18, 2025, through Pimienta Films at La Casa del Cine MX. The film released at the Morelia International Film Festival on October 11, 2025. It will followed by a release in select theatres on November 13. It was for a worldwide release on November 20, 2025, on Netflix. The film will be screened on November 15 at the 40th Mar del Plata International Film Festival.
