= Mirreyes contra Godínez =

- Directed by: Chava Cartas
- Written by: María Hinojos
- Starring: Pablo Lyle; Daniel Tovar; Regina Blandón; Diana Bovio
- Cinematography: Beto Casillas
- Production company: Draco Films
- Distributed by: Videocine
- Release date: 25 January 2019 (Mexico)
- Running time: 109 minutes
- Country: Mexico
- Language: Spanish

Mirreyes contra Godínez (lit. 'Mirreyes vs. Godínez') is a 2019 Mexican comedy film directed by Chava Cartas. The film premiered on 25 January 2019, and is stars Pablo Lyle, Daniel Tovar, Regina Blandón, and Diana Bovio. The plot revolves around the death of a wealthy shoemaker, after his death begins a hilarious battle between the "Mirreyes" (preppy guys) and the "Godínez" (working class guys) to gain control of the company.

== Cast ==
- Pablo Lyle as Santi
- Daniel Tovar as Génaro
- Regina Blandón as Michelle
- Diana Bovio as Nancy
- Roberto Aguire as Ricardo
- Claudia Ramírez as Emilia
- Christian Vázquez as Conan
- Hernán Mendoza as Don Francisco
- Gloria Stalina as Sofía
- Alejandro de Marino as Shimon

== Sequel ==
After the success of the film, on 31 October 2019 the newspaper El Universal Mexico confirmed that the film would have a sequel, which began filming in February 2020. Mirreyes contra Godínez 2: El retiro was released on 21 July 2022.

== See also ==
- List of highest-grossing Mexican films
