= Elyfer Torres =

Mexican actress (born 1998)

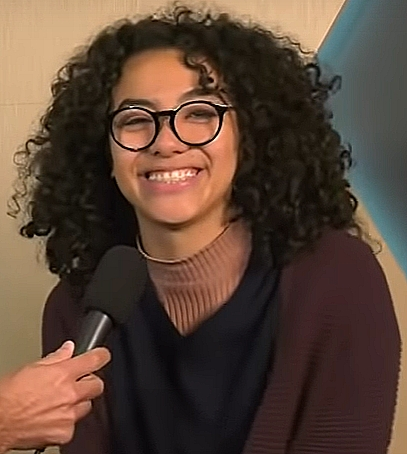
- Torres as her character Betty Rincon in 2019
- Born: 15 February 1997 (age 29); Mexico City, Mexico
- Occupation: Actress
- Years active: 2012–present
- Notable work: Betty en NY

Elvia Fernanda Torres Pérez (born 15 February 1997), known professionally as Elyfer Torres, is a Mexican actress. Her first major role was portraying the titular character in the Telemundo telenovela Betty en NY (2019). Although previously she stood out for series like La rosa de Guadalupe (2012–2017), La Piloto (2018), El secreto de Selena (2018), and Nicky Jam: El Ganador (2018).

== Early life and education ==
Torres was born on 15 February 1997 in Mexico City, Mexico. She began her artistic training as a child, taking workshops at the Centro de Educación Artística of Televisa. Later, she specialized in acting for cinema at the renowned New York Film Academy in Los Angeles; returning to Mexico to continue her training at the CasAzul of Argos school, and finally, she finished her classical dance training at the Royal Academy of Dance in England.

== Filmography ==
=== Film roles ===
Year	Title	Role	Notes
2016	H.H.L.	Mai	Short film

=== Television roles ===
Year	Title	Role	Notes
2012–2017	La rosa de Guadalupe	Úrsula Esmeralda Úrsula Rosita Lucero	Episode: "Última llamada a la felicidad" Episode: "Héroes" Episode: "La llamada" Episode: "Mi abuelo y él" Episode: "Sonreír por un sueño"
2018	La Piloto	Claire	Recurring role (season 2); 22 episodes
2018	El secreto de Selena	Gabriela Contreras	Recurring role; 2 episodes
2018	Nicky Jam: El Ganador	Julia	Episode: "The Future Is Paisa"
2019	Betty en NY	Beatriz "Betty" Aurora Rincón	Lead role; 123 episodes
2020	Enemigo íntimo	Alicia García	Main role (season 2)
2021	40 y 20	Clementina	Episode: "A la prima no se le arrima"
2021	Guerra de vecinos	Tere	Main role
2024	Mujeres asesinas	Rosario	Episode: "Rosario"

=== Music videos ===
Year	Title	Performed by
2017	"Rompecorazones"	Music video by Dulce María
