= List of No Fear of Truth episodes =

Sin miedo a la verdad is a Mexican anthology television series produced by Rubén Galindo for Televisa.

The series has been renewed for a third season.

== Series overview ==
Season	Title	Episodes	Originally released	
Season	Title	Episodes	First released	Last released
1	You Are No Longer Alone	21	8 October 2018	2 November 2018
2	Wake Up	25	8 July 2019	9 August 2019
3	Time to Rise Again	35	9 March 2020	24 April 2020

== Episodes ==
=== Season 1: You Are No Longer Alone (2018) ===
No. overall	No. in season	Title	Original release date	Mexico viewers (millions)
1	1	"Mirreyes impunes"	8 October 2018	3.7
2	2	"Secuestro a periodista"	9 October 2018	2.9
3	3	"Los niños de La Ballena Azul"	10 October 2018	3.2
4	4	"Traficantes de órganos"	11 October 2018	3.1
5	5	"Narcomenudistas online"	12 October 2018	2.9
6	6	"Trata de personas"	15 October 2018	3.2
7	7	"Golpeador de mujeres"	16 October 2018	3.2
8	8	"Robo de bebés"	17 October 2018	3.4
9	9	"Las Goteras VIP parte 1"	18 October 2018	3.0
10	10	"Las Goteras VIP parte 2"	19 October 2018	3.0
11	11	"Despedida de soltera parte 1"	22 October 2018	2.9
12	12	"Despedida de soltera parte 2"	23 October 2018	3.1
13	13	"Derecho de piso"	24 October 2018	3.2
14	14	"Rehenes en el banco"	25 October 2018	3.3
15	15	"El Stalker"	26 October 2018	3.0
16	16	"La extorsión"	29 October 2018	3.0
17	17	"A contra tiempo"	30 October 2018	3.1
18	18	"La confusión"	31 October 2018	2.9
19	19	"El intercambio"	1 November 2018	2.9
20	20	"El escape"	2 November 2018	3.0
21	21	"La verdad"	4 November 2018	3.4

=== Season 2: Wake Up (2019) ===
No. overall	No. in season	Title	Original release date	Viewers (millions)
22	1	"La revelación"	8 July 2019 (Note: Premiered early online through Las Estrellas website on 1 July 2019.)	3.0
23	2	"Falsos apóstoles"	9 July 2019	2.7
24	3	"Envenenamiento por plomo"	10 July 2019	2.9
25	4	"El hacker"	11 July 2019	2.9
26	5	"Linchamiento equivocado"	12 July 2019	3.0
27	6	"La trampa"	15 July 2019 (Note: Premiered early online through Las Estrellas website on 15 July 2019.)	2.7
28	7	"La ejemplar familia Ramos (parte 1)"	16 July 2019	2.7
29	8	"La ejemplar familia Ramos (parte 2)"	17 July 2019	2.7
30	9	"Los diablitos"	18 July 2019	2.6
31	10	"S.O.S."	19 July 2019	2.7
32	11	"La mentira"	22 July 2019 (Note: Premiered early online through Las Estrellas website on 22 July 2019.)	2.7
33	12	"Trata laboral (parte 1)"	23 July 2019	2.8
34	13	"Trata laboral (parte 2)"	24 July 2019	2.9
35	14	"La bestia de Centenar (parte 1)"	25 July 2019 (Note: Premiered early online through Las Estrellas website on 24 July 2019.)	2.9
36	15	"La bestia de Centenar (parte 2)"	26 July 2019	3.2
37	16	"Extorsión desde la cárcel"	29 July 2019	2.9
38	17	"Rehenes (parte 1)"	30 July 2019	3.0
39	18	"Rehenes (parte 2)"	31 July 2019	2.9
40	19	"Rehenes (parte 3)"	1 August 2019	3.1
41	20	"El escape"	2 August 2019	3.1
42	21	"La mafia del poder"	5 August 2019	2.9
43	22	"Escorts"	6 August 2019	3.1
44	23	"La regresión"	7 August 2019	3.0
45	24	"Área 16"	8 August 2019	3.1
46	25	"No doblaré las manos"	9 August 2019	3.3

=== Season 3: Time to Rise Again (2020) ===
No. overall	No. in season	Title	Original release date	Mexico viewers (millions)
47	1	"El atentado"	9 March 2020 (Note: Premiered early online through Las Estrellas website and YouTube channel on 6 March 2020.)	3.2
48	2	"La cacería"	10 March 2020	3.0
49	3	"La traición"	11 March 2020	2.8
50	4	"Huyendo de la verdad"	12 March 2020	3.3
51	5	"Temores"	13 March 2020	2.9
52	6	"La playa"	16 March 2020	2.5
53	7	"La confrontación"	17 March 2020	2.8
54	8	"El rescate (parte 1)"	18 March 2020	3.1
55	9	"El rescate (parte 2)"	19 March 2020	3.3
56	10	"La desaparición (parte 1)"	20 March 2020	3.2
57	11	"La desaparición (parte 2)"	23 March 2020	3.1
58	12	"Obediencia (parte 1)"	24 March 2020	3.3
59	13	"Obediencia (parte 2)"	25 March 2020	3.1
60	14	"Obediencia (parte 3)"	26 March 2020	3.1
61	15	"El pispireto (parte 1)"	27 March 2020	3.1
62	16	"El pispireto (parte 2)"	30 March 2020	3.0
63	17	"El pispireto (parte 3)"	31 March 2020	3.1
64	18	"Dinero fácil (parte 1)"	1 April 2020	3.1
65	19	"Dinero fácil (parte 1)"	2 April 2020	3.4
66	20	"Dinero fácil (parte 3)"	3 April 2020	3.4
67	21	"Mulas de armas (parte 1)"	6 April 2020	2.9
68	22	"Mulas de armas (parte 2)"	7 April 2020	3.4
69	23	"El Acuartelamiento (parte 1)"	8 April 2020	3.2
70	24	"El Acuartelamiento (parte 2)"	9 April 2020	2.8
71	25	"La rendición"	10 April 2020	3.1
72	26	"Compra-venta de autos (parte 1)"	13 April 2020	3.0
73	27	"Compra-venta de autos (parte 2)"	14 April 2020	3.5
74	28	"El acosador (parte 1)"	15 April 2020	3.2
75	29	"El acosador (parte 2)"	16 April 2020	3.4
76	30	"El testigo (parte 1)"	17 April 2020	3.2
77	31	"El testigo (parte 2)"	20 April 2020	3.4
78	32	"Robo a casa habitación (parte 1)"	21 April 2020	3.3
79	33	"Robo a casa habitación (parte 2)"	22 April 2020	3.3
80	34	"Amigo fiel (parte 1)"	23 April 2020	3.6
81	35	"Amigo fiel (parte 2)"	24 April 2020	3.6
