= Morganna Love =

Mexican opera singer

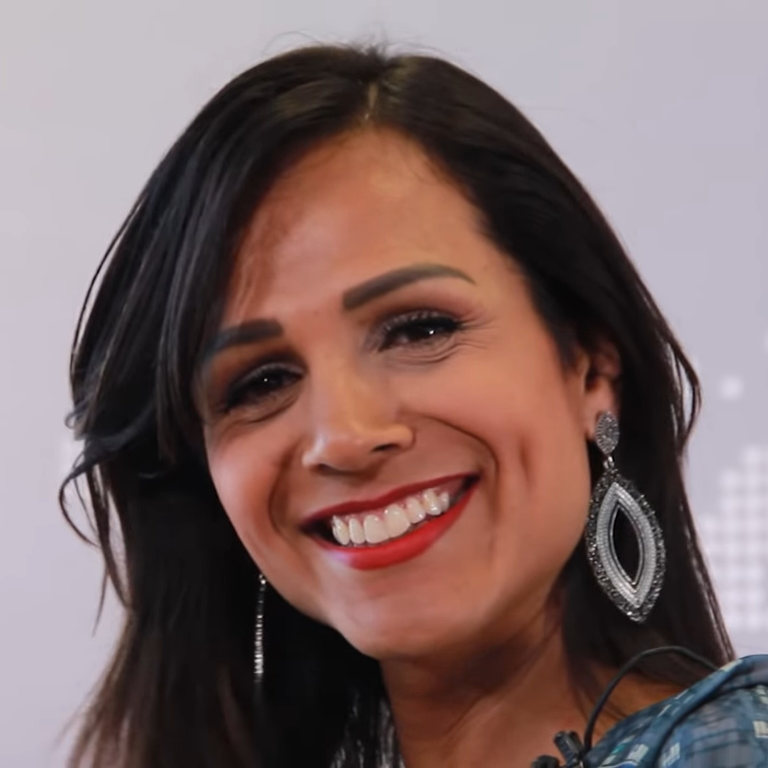
- Born: June 15, 1980 (age 46); San Miguel de Allende, Guanajuato, Mexico
- Other name: Aleizah Morganna Martínez Bautista

Aleizah Morganna Martínez Bautista (born June 15, 1980), known professionally as Morganna Love, is a Mexican opera singer and actress. She is best known for her appearance in Made in Bangkok (2015), a documentary about her life and transition.

== Career ==
Love was born on June 15, 1980, in San Miguel de Allende, Mexico. At the age of four, she began singing, and a child took part in her school's choir. She also began wearing makeup and imitating female celebrities on television. During her adolescence, she states that this resulted in bullying, and that she engaged in acts of self-harm due to gender dysphoria. At first, she defined herself as a gay man, but secretly saw herself as a transgender woman. In 2001, she started to study music at the Universidad de Guanajuato, and later opera at the Mexican Conservatorio Nacional de Música. Around her graduation, she worked for an opera company, still presenting as a man. It was during this time that she decided to transition. As a result, her family and friends rejected her, and she lived alone, singing in clubs as she underwent hormone therapy.

=== 2012–present: Made in Bangkok and acting ===
In 2012, Love represented Mexico in the Miss International Queen contest, hoping to win money that would help her transition. While she did not win, she did learn of doctors who would agree to perform surgery on her. Later that year, she underwent sex reassignment surgery in Thailand, a process which was documented in the film Made in Bangkok. Created by the filmmaker Flavio Florencio and released in 2015, it was met with critical acclaim and success. In 2016, the documentary was nominated for an Ariel Award, under the class of Best Documentary Feature.

Due to the success of the documentary, Love subsequently acted in the series Crónica de castas and the short film Oasis, which won an Ariel award. In 2017, she released her first album, Dos Vidas en Una, in which she sang a mixture of opera and pop music. She participated in the seventh season of La Voz, joined Anitta's team. In 2018, she provided the voice for the character of Blanca Evangelista in the Latin American dubbing of Pose.

In 2020, Love participated in the film 10 Songs for Charity, a Dutch movie by filmmaker Karin Jonger about sex trafficking in Europe. In 2020, she was listed by Forbes as one of the 200 most powerful women in Mexico, as a result of her activism. She has been appointed as an Ambassador for the Free & Equal Human Rights Program by the United Nations.

In 2021, Love acted in the HBO show The Cleaning Lady.

== Filmography ==
=== Television ===
==== Television series ====
- La muchacha que limpia (2021)
- Crónica de castas (2014)

==== Reality show ====
- La voz (2018)

=== Film ===
- Made in Bangkok (Documentary) (2015)
- Oasis (Short film) (2017)
- 10 Songs for Charity (2020)
- Estaciones (Short film) (2020)
- Traviatas (Short film) (2020)
