= Christian Vázquez (actor) =

Mexican actor

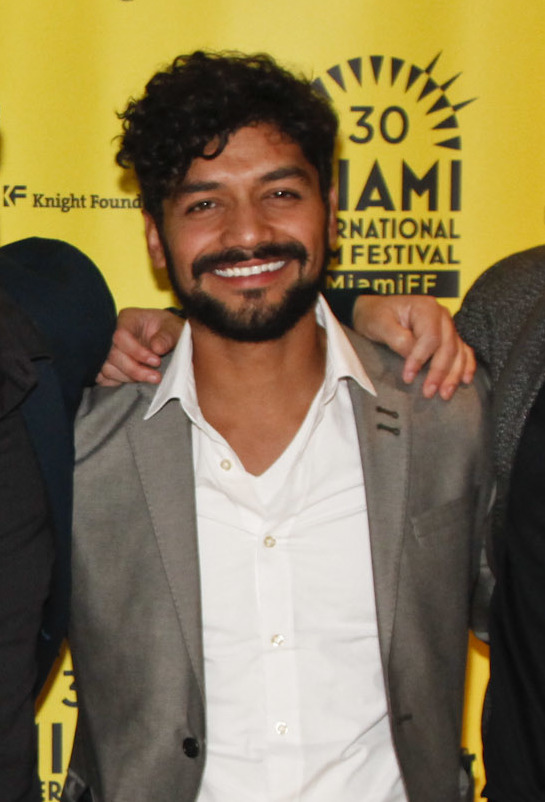
- Vázquez at the 2013 Miami International Film Festival
- Born: Guadalajara, Jalisco, Mexico
- Education: University of Guadalajara
- Occupation: Actor
- Years active: 2007–present

Christian Vázquez (born in Guadalajara, Jalisco, Mexico) is a Mexican actor; best known in his native country for his multiple roles in Mexican films. Vázquez studied performing arts at the University of Guadalajara. He started working as a waiter in a hotel and later began his acting career doing television commercials for different brands.

== Filmography ==
=== Film roles ===
Year	Title	Roles	Notes
2007	El precio de la inocencia	Moncho	
2009	Oveja negra	José	
2009	Chamaco	Wilo	
2011	Galeana No. 8	Actor #2	
2012	S.O.L.	Dude	Short film
2012	I Hate Love	Robo	
2013	Cinco de Mayo: La batalla	Juan Osorno	
2013	Ladies Nice	Güicho	
2013	Tlatelolco, verano del 68	Félix	
2013	One Tenth of a Wish	Restaurant Patron	Short film
2013	Elysium	Gangster	
2014	Diego	Roy	Short film
2014	Yerbamala	Jesús YerbaMala	
2014	Cantinflas	Torero Pobre	
2015	Aerosol	Train	
2017	3 idiotas	Felipe	
2018	Dibujando el cielo	Gerardo	
2018	Leona	Iván	
2019	Mirreyes contra Godínez	Conan	
2019	Loco fin de semana	Fede	
2019	Super Bomberos	Ángel	
2019	Yo Fausto	Fausto	
2022	Mirreyes contra Godínez 2: El retiro	Conan	
2025	Mirreyes contra Godínez: Las Vegas	Conan	

=== Television roles ===
Year	Title	Roles	Notes
2008	La rosa de Guadalupe	Womita	Episode: "Soy emo"
2010	Gritos de muerte y libertad	Prisoner	Episode: "El primer sueño: 1808"
2011	Bienvenida realidad	Darío Estrada	
2013	Hombre tenías que ser	Mario Molina	
2015	El capitán Camacho	Tirzo	
2015	UEPA! Un escenario para amar	Moisés "Moy" Lezama	
2015	Caminos de Guanajuato	Celso Mora	
2015	El Dandy	Toño	
2016	Un día cualquiera	Luis Martín	Episode: "Crímenes increíbles"
2016–2017	Vuelve temprano	Gabriel Castro	Series regular; 83 episodes
2016–2017	Rosario Tijeras	Fierro	Series regular (season 1); 56 episodes
2019	Sitiados: México	Moro	Series regular; 8 episodes
2019	Los pecados de Bárbara		
2020	De brutas, nada	Alejandro Montero	Main role
2021	The War Next-door	Tomás	Main role
2022	Amores que engañan	Frank	Episode: "Solo una oportunidad"
2026	Colisión	Ikal	
