= Sergio Olhovich =

Film director, screenwriter

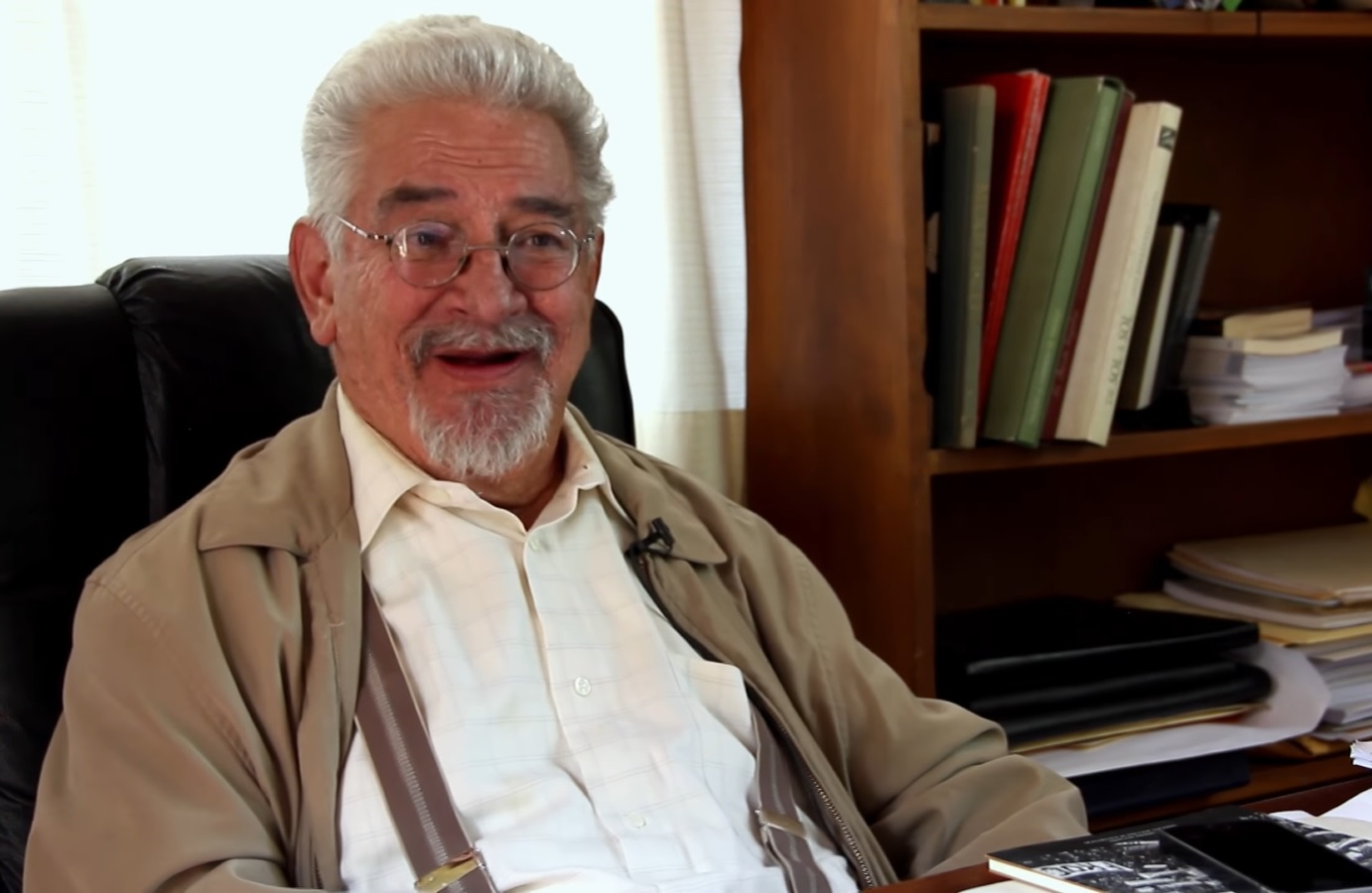
- Born: 9 October 1941 (age 84); Sumatra, Indonesia
- Occupations: Film director, screenwriter
- Years active: 1970-1999

Sergio Olhovich (born 9 October 1941) is a Russian-Mexican film director and screenwriter. He directed 18 films between 1970 and 1999. His 1975 film The House in the South was entered into the 9th Moscow International Film Festival. In 1997, he was a member of the jury at the 20th Moscow International Film Festival.

== Selected filmography ==
- The House in the South (1975)
- 1938: When Mexico Recovered Its Oil (2025)
