= Julia vs. Julia =

2019 Mexican comedy series

- Genre: Comedy
- Written by: Paula Rendón; Alfredo Ballestros; Perícles Sánchez; Álvaro Mora; Gerardo Fernández
- Directed by: Javier Solar
- Starring: Consuelo Duval; Ruy Senderos; Liliana Abud; Alberto Garmassi; Alejandro Ávila; Priscila Faz
- Country of origin: Mexico
- Original language: Spanish
- No. of seasons: 1
- No. of episodes: 13

Production
- Executive producer: Nazareno Pérez Brancatto
- Production company: Televisa

Original release
- Network: Las Estrellas
- Release: 30 April – 23 July 2019

Julia vs. Julia is a Mexican comedy television series produced by Nazareno P. Brancatto that aired on Las Estrellas from 30 April 2019 to 23 July 2019. The series stars Consuelo Duval as the titular character.

== Plot ==
Julia Montemayor managed to be at the height of fame, being one of the most famous television actresses. This is how she learned the privileges that success and fame grants. Later she is replaced by a younger woman, reason why she falls into decline and is fired. Julia never prepared for that as she never saved her money, she did not seek friendships, she did not have any relationships and, above all, she did not care for her family. Now, faced with the adversity of losing everything, she must remake her way of life. However, Julia is unpredictable and in trying to live in a normal world, she turns upside down the lives of her son, her assistant and her eccentric mother.

== Cast ==
- Consuelo Duval as Julia Montemayor
- Ruy Senderos as Jaime
- Liliana Abud as Carmen
- Alberto Garmassi as Samuel
- Alejandro Ávila as Emiliano
- Priscila Faz as Lucía
- Nailea Norvind as Isabel

== Episodes ==
No.	Title	Original release date
1	"Lady Televisa"	30 April 2019
Julia becomes #LadyTelevisa and is left without money, after finding out that she is not the protagonist of her new telenovela and losing control in a live interview.
2	"Julia contra Televisa"	7 May 2019
Julia loses the most precious thing: her job and her badge at Televisa, but she is also thrown out on the street from her own home. Because of this, she will organize an epic party, which will make her rise again.
3	"Julia contra la rata"	14 May 2019
After being evicted from her luxurious home, Julia and her family begin to adapt to their new and poor house, and to their new lifestyle, which includes dirty water, cactus-based diet, housework and a rat as a tenant.
4	"Julia contra las redes"	21 May 2019
Julia finds out that on the internet people make fun of her, they insult her and everybody hates her. So, she sends a message to the entire nation, with the intention of being the queen of the Internet but an intervention of her mother, makes her go viral instead.
5	"Julia contra el olvido"	28 May 2019
Because Julia is no longer recognized anywhere, she seeks to be part of a scandal to return to fame, so she tries to steal in a clothing store. Samuel asks Jaime for help to reconquer Martha.
6	"Julia contra el pasado"	4 June 2019
Jaime gets Julia re-hired but first she must apologize to Lucía, so Julia asks Emiliano to invite her to dinner at the same place where her enemy is.
7	"Julia contra la familia feliz"	11 June 2019
Julia is convinced that she has to project the image of the perfect family and invites Vargas, Lucia and her new husband to dinner.
8	"Julia contra el casting"	18 June 2019
Julia feels indignant because she is sent to a casting for the role of a mature woman, so she decides to compete with Lucía for a young character role, dressing in the most inappropriate way.
9	"Julia contra la diva"	25 June 2019
Julia discovers that she only has one line in the film for which she was hired and wants to gain prominence at the expense of Lucía, but decides at the end to work as a team.
10	"Julia contra la alfombra roja"	2 July 2019
Julia arrives at the premiere of her film, but discovers that Lucía is wearing the same dress as her and becomes hysterical, tries to remedy the situation, but only manages to provoke a new scandal.
11	"Julia contra el amor"	9 July 2019
Julia starts a romance with Aureliano; however, she realizes that he is not her admirer, but rather Rosario Santodomingo, of whom he is obsessed with. Jaime is determined to save Julia from Aureliano.
12	"Julia contra el reality"	16 July 2019
Julia's new reality show is released, where it seems that everyone hates her. Luz Elena González participates in the show and looks for the way to take Emiliano away from Julia at all costs.
13	"Julia contra la India"	23 July 2019
Everything gets worse for Julia, because having money again causes her son to get mad at her and for her mother to bet on poker. Jaime tells Julia that they will remake the best soap opera of Rosario Santodomingo, but she is willing to go to India after Samuel leaves her.
