= Daniel Tovar =

Mexican actor (born 1989)

- Daniel Tovar at the premiere of Mirreyes vs. Godínez 3
- Born: Daniel Tovar; August 27, 1989 (age 37); Mexico City, Mexico
- Occupation: Actor
- Years active: 1999–present

Daniel Tovar (born August 27, 1989) is a Mexican actor. Tovar is mostly known for his roles as Fito in the sitcom Skimo for all its 4 seasons, and as Alejandro in the award-winning film La Zona. However, his career began in 1999 with the miniseries "Camino a Casa".

== Filmography ==
Television roles
Year	Title	Role	Notes
2006–2007	Skimo	Fito	
2008–2009	Me Mueves	Arturo	
2010–2013	Niñas mal	José "Piti" de Jesús	
2014	Sr. Ávila	Mauro	3 episodes
2016	El Vato	Valentín Arellano	Episode: Movimiento alternado
2016–2017	Despertar contigo	Rodolfo Soler	
2018	Falsos Falsificados	Oliver	
2018	El Rey del Valle	José Édgar "Joed" Contreras	
2019	Un poquito tuyo	Elton Rosales	
2019–2020	Médicos, línea de vida	Daniel Juárez	
2023	Tierra de esperanza	Crisóforo "Cris" García	
2024	Entre paredes	Ramiro	
2025	Los hilos del pasado	Ricardo	

Film roles
Year	Title	Role	Notes
2006	La Vida Inmune	Malhora	
2007	La Zona	Alejandro	
2018	Loca por el trabajo	Rosendo	
2019	Mirreyes contra Godínez	Genaro González	
2022	Mirreyes contra Godínez 2: El retiro	Genaro González	
2023	Recursos humanos	Paruro	
2024	El candidato honesto	Uruchurtu	
2025	Las locuras		Netflix film
2025	Mirreyes contra Godínez: Las Vegas	Genaro González	

== Theatre ==
Year	Play	Director	Teatre
2009 / 2010	Barioná El Hijo Del Trueno	Juan José Tagle Briseño	Circulo Teatral
2009	Romeo Y Julieta	Juan José Tagle Briseño	Teatro Julio Prieto
2003	10 Escenas Cortas 10	Maria Eugenia Bravo	CasAzul
