= List of Corazón en condominio episodes =

Corazón en Condominio (Heart in Condominium) is a Mexican telenovela produced by Azteca in 2013. It stars Victor García and Cynthia Rodríguez as the main protagonists. It is based on Vecinos, a Colombian telenovela by Caracol. On 2 September 2013, Azteca started broadcasting Corazón en Condominio at 7:30pm, replacing Destino. The last episode was broadcast on 29 March 2014.

== Episodes ==
Air Date	Number	Episode Title	Rating	Duration
2 September 2013	001	Óscar conoce a Tatiana y empezarán los enredos en esta gran historia	6.4	60 minutes
3 September 2013	002	Rodolfo se siente celoso de Óscar	6.2	51 minutes
4 September 2013	003	¿Óscar perdió su billete de lotería premiado?	5.9	47 minutes
5 September 2013	004	Óscar es ahora un multimillonario y todos los de la vecindad lo saben	6.3	46 minutes
6 September 2013	005	Óscar y Tatiana se vuelven a encontrar por la venta del departamento	6.8	46 minutes
9 September 2013	006	Rodolfo no quiere que Óscar compre el penthouse por celos	6.6	47 minutes
10 September 2013	007	Jessica no pierde la oportunidad para demostrar que sólo le interesa el dinero de Óscar	6.6	42 minutes
11 September 2013	008	Tatiana está entre la espada y la pared porque Óscar esté en el condominio	6.4	42 minutes
12 September 2013	009	Tatiana se queda en la fiesta de Óscar y sus vecinos se lo recriminan	6.6	42 minutes
13 September 2013	010	Macario le dice a Óscar que no piensa soportar sus escándalos	5.9	41 minutes
16 September 2013	011	Óscar no puede evitar sentir celos de Rodolfo al verlo con Tatiana	7.0	41 minutes
17 September 2013	012	Jessica le informa a Rodolfo que Tatiana está con Óscar	6.2	41 minutes
18 September 2013	013	Óscar le pide a doña Licha la mano de Jessica	5.9	42 minutes
19 September 2013	014	Óscar formalizó su relación que Jessica	6.3	42 minutes
20 September 2013	015	Rodolfo comienza a hacer mal uso del dinero de Tatiana	6.1	42 minutes
23 September 2013	016	Óscar será demandado por los daños ocasionados al departamento de vecinos	6.2	43 minutes
24 September 2013	017	Óscar termina destruyendo la ropa de Sarita	6.6	44 minutes
25 September 2013	018	Doña Chabela está tirada en el suelo y la tienen que llevar al doctor	7.3	42 minutes
26 September 2013	019	Jessica y su mamá intentan sedar a Doña Chabelita	5.8	43 minutes
27 September 2013	020	Los vecinos del condominio conocieron a Doña Chabelita, la mamá de Óscar	6.4	42 minutes
30 September 2013	021	Óscar le dice a Jessica que piensa que las cosas entre ellos ya no funcionan	6.6	41 minutes
1 October 2013	022	La navidad llegó a la vecindad de Óscar y festejarán en grande	6.8	46 minutes
2 October 2013	023	Rodolfo no llegará a repartir sus regalos para desacreditar a Óscar	6.0	48 minutes
3 October 2013	024	Tatiana firmará su acuerdo con Rodolfo para la asociación	5.7	47 minutes
4 October 2013	025	Jessica le metió ideas equivocadas a Tatiana sobre los sentimientos de Óscar	6.6	47 minutes
7 October 2013	026	Óscar ocasionó un desastre en su edificio y Tatiana no piensa aguantarlo	6.9	42 minutes
8 October 2013	027	Jessica está segura que no tiene nada de qué preocuparse entre Óscar y Tatiana	6.6	43 minutes
9 October 2013	028	Óscar cae en la trampa de seducción de Jessica y Tatiana no lo perdonará	7.0	42 minutes
10 October 2013	029	Óscar hará todo por estar al lado de Tatiana hasta romper el compromiso con Jessica	6.1	42 minutes
11 October 2013	030	Óscar desata más celos entre Rodolfo y Tatiana	6.6	42 minutes
14 October 2013	031	Óscar quiere conquitar a toda costa a Tatiana y sus vecinos saben que entre ellos hay algo	6.9	40 minutes
15 October 2013	032	Tatiana decide casarse con Rodolfo por despecho y el engaño de Óscar	6.5	40 minutes
16 October 2013	033	Tatiana está destrozada por lo que le hizo Óscar y ahora se casará con Rodolfo	6.4	39 minutes
17 October 2013	034	Tatiana le dice a Óscar que lo descubrió y ahora sabe quién es en realidad	6.0	37 minutes
18 October 2013	035	Tatiana les pone un alto a sus vecinas para que no se metan en su vida	5.8	37 minutes
21 October 2013	036	Óscar se enfrenta a Rodolfo por el amor de Tatiana	6.5	42 minutes
22 October 2013	037	Óscar y Rodolfo tienen un enfrentamiento por el amor de Tatiana	7.1	39 minutes
23 October 2013	038	Óscar le propuso matrimonio a Jessica enfrente de Tatiana	8.4	39 minutes
24 October 2013	039	Óscar le dice a Tatiana que sólo se comprometió con Jessica por darle celos	6.5	40 minutes
25 October 2013	040	Óscar tiene los días contados para hacer que Tatiana no se case con Rodolfo	6.9	38 minutes
28 October 2013	041	Poncho seguirá engañando a Sarita	7.3	39 minutes
29 October 2013	042	Rodolfo ya no quiere estar en sus sucios negocios, pero no podrá salirse	6.9	40 minutes
30 October 2013	043	Paty se hace un cambio de imagen para que Henry Jonás vuelva con ella	6.5	39 minutes
31 October 2013	044	¿Óscar le dio dinero a Jessica para los gastos de la boda?	7.0	39 minutes
1 November 2013	045	Capítulo divertido de viernes, revívelo aquí	5.9	39 minutes
4 November 2013	046	Óscar planea ya cómo descubrir a Jessica en su engaño con Rodolfo	6.9	39 minutes
5 November 2013	047	Tatiana no cree nada sobre el engaño de Rodolfo con Jessica	8.3	41 minutes
6 November 2013	048	Rodolfo sentirá celos y querrá meterse a la despedida de soltera de Tatiana	8.6	38 minutes
7 November 2013	049	Los hombres se metieron a la despedida de soltera de Tatiana y Jessica	9.1	39 minutes
8 November 2013	050	Óscar se enamoró más de Tatiana al verla vestida tan sensual	7.8	38 minutes
11 November 2013	051	Óscar se enfrenta a Rodolfo porque no quiere que siga engañando a Tatiana	7.9	37 minutes
12 November 2013	052	Óscar le pide a su mamá que lo ayude a impedir la boda de Tatiana con Rodolfo	7.7	36 minutes
13 November 2013	053	Jessica está triste porque no puede estar con Rodolfo y se tiene que casar con Óscar	8.1	38 minutes
14 November 2013	054	Óscar le dijo la verdad de su dinero a Jessica y ella aceptó casarse con él	8.0	37 minutes
15 November 2013	055	Tatiana le dice a Óscar que nunca olvidará sus besos	7.5	36 minutes
18 November 2013	056	Tatiana sufrió un accidente en la boda por culpa de Rodolfo	7.6	39 minutes
19 November 2013	057	¿Rodolfo todavía tiene esperanzas de que Tatiana se recupere?	7.8	38 minutes
20 November 2013	058	Óscar se metió hasta el cuarto de Tatiana y Rodolfo no lo soporta, e impedirá su entrada	7.8	40 minutes
21 November 2013	059	Óscar hace todo para ver un momento a Tatiana en el hospital	8.3	36 minutes
22 November 2013	060	Rodolfo no podrá matar a Tatiana y Sarita por poco lo descubre intentándolo	7.5	37 minutes
25 November 2013	061	Óscar hizo que Tatiana despertara del coma con una serenata	7.8	35 minutes
26 November 2013	062	Óscar fue a parar a prisión por la serenata que le llevó a Tatiana al hospital	7.9	39 minutes
27 November 2013	063	Tatiana le pide el divorcio a Rodolfo y él no lo puede creer	7.6	35 minutes
28 November 2013	064	Chabela habla con Tatiana sobre el amor que Óscar siente por ella	8.2	39 minutes
29 November 2013	065	¿Chabela y Licha se pelean por Gervacio?	7.4	38 minutes
2 December 2013	066	Hacen creer que Tatiana perdió la razón y ahora está loca	7.4	38 minutes
3 December 2013	067	Gervasio sorprende con una cena a Chabela	6.6	39 minutes
4 December 2013	068	Licha quiere que todos se enteren que Gervasio y Chabela se acostaron	7.2	36 minutes
5 December 2013	069	Rodolfo quiere ser el nuevo presidente del condominio	7.4	39 minutes
6 December 2013	070	Rodolfo le recuerda a Tatiana que están casados y debe cumplir sus deberes	7.1	35 minutes
9 December 2013	071	Tatiana le dice a Rodolfo que saldrá de viaje y ella descubre su engaño	7.7	39 minutes
10 December 2013	072	Tatiana le dice a Rodolfo que saldrá de viaje y descubre su infidelidad	7.0	39 minutes
11 December 2013	073	Poncho no cerrará el negocio con Don Gervasio	6.5	40 minutes
12 December 2013	074	Álvaro ya sabe como sacar de la jugada a Tatiana	5.8	36 minutes
13 December 2013	075	Rodolfo planea la venganza en contra de Óscar y Tatiana	6.9	38 minutes
16 December 2013	076	Tatiana se da cuenta que Rodolfo no ha firmado ningún papel	7.0	37 minutes
17 December 2013	077	Tatiana comienza a sentir malestares por lo que Álvaro le pone a sus bebidas	7.1	39 minutes
18 December 2013	078	Nicole se deprime porque Henry decidió quedarse con su esposa	6.4	39 minutes
19 December 2013	079	Clara piensa que será abuela y que Ligia está embarazada de Álvarito	5.9	35 minutes
20 December 2013	080	Óscar tendrá las pruebas de la relación entre Jessica y Rodolfo	6.8	38 minutes
23 December 2013	081	El plan de Rodolfo y Álvaro sigue marchando a la perfección	5.4	38 minutes
24 December 2013	082	Jessica le propone a Nicole regresarle al Henry	4.9	38 minutes
25 December 2013	083	Óscar sabe que Tatiana en verdad tiene un tumor en la cabeza	6.0	39 minutes
26 December 2013	084	Rodolfo sabe que el tumor de Tatiana no se puede operar y que Óscar lo cree	7.0	22 minutes
27 December 2013	085	Álvaro tiene planteado el siguiente paso para quitarle todo a Tatiana	7.8	38 minutes
30 December 2013	086	Óscar celebra estar con Tatiana	N/A	39 minutes
31 December 2013	087	Óscar está perdido, y preocupado por Tatiana	5.6	38 minutes
1 January 2014	088	Nicole cambió de look para agradarle de nuevo al Henry	5.8	39 minutes
2 January 2014	089	Rodolfo vaciará las cuentas de Tatiana para dejarla en la ruina	6.9	38 minutes
3 January 2014	090	Licha echará a perder la propuesta de Gervasio a Chabela de matrimonio	6.5	39 minutes
6 January 2014	091	Rodolfo se lleva a Tatiana muy lejos para poder dejarla en la ruina	7.2	39 minutes
7 January 2014	092	Chabela regaña a Tatiana por tener una relación con Óscar sin estar divorciada	7.2	38 minutes
8 January 2014	093	Óscar y Tatiana consumaron su amor, y fueron descubiertos	7.3	40 minutes
9 January 2014	094	Clara descubrió a Tatiana y a Óscar en la azotea del condominio	6.8	39 minutes
10 January 2014	095	Rodolfo tiene un arma para destruir por completo a Tatiana	7.4	39 minutes
13 January 2014	096	Tatiana sabe que le quedan pocos días de vida	7.1	39 minutes
14 January 2014	097	Álvaro comienza a ver Nicole con otros ojos	6.5	38 minutes
15 January 2014	098	Clarita es ahora la presidenta del Fontainebleau	6.9	40 minutes
16 January 2014	099	Óscar podría caer en las garras de Bárbara	6.8	38 minutes
17 January 2014	100	Clara pone de cabeza en Fontainebleau con sus nuevas normas	7.0	38 minutes
20 January 2014	101	Paty creyó la mentira de Doña Licha para inculpar a Henry de una infidelidad	7.1	39 minutes
21 January 2014	102	Henry no acepta el engaño que según dicen le hizo a Paty	6.8	40 minutes
22 January 2014	103	Chabela le confiesa a Tatiana que Gervasio es el verdadero padre de Óscar	6.4	39 minutes
23 January 2014	104	Nicole no se saldrá con la suya, Doña Chabela no se dejará chantajear	6.8	40 minutes
24 January 2014	105	Tata está embarazada y Sarita quiere saber quién es el padre	7.2	37 minutes
27 January 2014	106	Chabela no puede decirle la verdad a Gervasio sobre que Óscar es su hijo	7.3	39 minutes
28 January 2014	107	Sarita no soporta la idea de que Tata está embarazada y ella no	6.8	39 minutes
29 January 2014	108	Óscar caerá en las garras de Bárbara y Tatiana pensará lo peor	7.3	39 minutes
30 January 2014	109	A Licha no se le escapa ningún hombre y ahora estará con Álvaro	6.7	37 minutes
31 January 2014	110	Tatiana sabe que Óscar no la engañó con Bárbara	6.8	39 minutes
3 February 2014	111	Óscar sabrá quién le dijo todas las mentiras a Tatiana	6.9	40 minutes
4 February 2014	112	Tatiana le pedirá el divorcio a Rodolfo para poder estar con Óscar definitivamente	7.6	39 minutes
5 February 2014	113	Óscar sigue apoyando a Bárbara sin darse cuenta que sus palabras son mentiras	8.2	38 minutes
6 February 2014	114	Jessica le dice a Óscar que prefiere morir antes de saber que Rodolfo la dejó	7.6	37 minutes
7 February 2014	115	Óscar y Tatiana aconsejan a Tata para que no revela quién es el papá del hijo que espera	7.6	38 minutes
10 February 2014	116	Álvaro le quitará todo el dinero a Rodolfo, pero el de Tatiana	7.1	39 minutes
11 February 2014	117	Jessica le dice a Oscar que Don Gervasio es su padre	7.3	39 minutes
12 February 2014	118	Oscar le reprocha a su mamá que no le haya dicho antes que Gervasio es su papá	7.3	39 minutes
13 February 2014	119	Óscar le dice a Don Gervasio que es su papá	6.5	39 minutes
14 February 2014	120	Chabela no sabe cómo le dirá a Gervasio que Óscar es su hijo	6.5	38 minutes
17 February 2014	121	N/A	7.9	39 minutes
18 February 2014	122	Gervasio se arrepiente y le dice a Chabela que sí se casen, pero ella lo rechaza	7.5	39 minutes
19 February 2014	123	Clarita sabrá que Licha es la mujer con la que está saliendo Álvaro	7.5	37 minutes
20 February 2014	124	Óscar llega a casa con Bárbara y Tatiana le confiesa a Chabela que él debe andar con ella	7.4	39 minutes
21 February 2014	125	Gervasio irá a buscar a Chabelita y le robará un beso	7.0	39 minutes
24 February 2014	126	Tatiana se llevó una gran desilusión	7.3	37 minutes
25 February 2014	127	Bárbara le dice a Tatiana que Óscar y ella no tienen nada, pero no le cree	7.0	36 minutes
26 February 2014	128	Tatiana le dice a Rodolfo que Chabela se quedará con sus acciones de la inmobiliaria	6.6	37 minutes
27 February 2014	129	Óscar le dice a Bárbara que solo puede amar a Tatiana	7.6	38 minutes
28 February 2014	130	Tatiana sospecha no sentirse mal a pesar que le dijeron que tiene dos semanas de vida	7.4	37 minutes
3 March 2014	131	¿Tatiana dejará a Óscar para regresar con Rodolfo?	8.2	37 minutes
4 March 2014	132	Licha y Álvaro siguen con sus encuentros casuales, pero alguien los vigila	7.0	35 minutes
5 March 2014	133	Tatiana le dice a Bárbara que tiene el camino libre con Óscar	7.2	37 minutes
6 March 2014	134	Óscar le cuenta a su mamá que Tatiana regresó con Rodolfo	7.5	37 minutes
7 March 2014	135	Tatiana ya no sabe si sufre más por su posible muerte o por el amor de Òscar	6.3	39 minutes
10 March 2014	136	Óscar convocará una junta urgente con los habitantes del condominio	7.0	40 minutes
11 March 2014	137	Rodolfo y Álvaro quedan sorprendidos cuando se enteran que Tatiana ¡está embarazada de Óscar!	7.5	38 minutes
12 March 2014	138	Rodolfo y Álvaro planean el golpe final contra Tatiana	7.2	39 minutes
13 March 2014	139	Clara descubrió a Licha con su marido	7.5	39 minutes
14 March 2014	140	Óscar cree que los síntomas que padece Tatiana son de un embarazo	7.5	37 minutes
17 March 2014	141	Jessica no soporta la idea de que Rodolfo esté con Tatiana	6.9	38 minutes
18 March 2014	142	Tatiana desea divertirse y disfrutar los "últimos días de su vida"	7.2	39 minutes
19 March 2014	143	Tatiana decidió encerrarse en su departamento para esperar la hora de su muerte	6.9	38 minutes
20 March 2014	144	Todos creen que Tatiana murió pero ella está más viva que nunca	7.2	38 minutes
21 March 2014	145	Tatiana quiere reorganizar su vida ahora que sabe que no morirá	7.0	37 minutes
24 March 2014	146	Rodolfo le advierte a Tatiana que se quedará en la calle si no regresa con él	7.6	37 minutes
25 March 2014	147	¡Óscar le pidió matrimonio a Bárbara!	7.5	37 minutes
26 March 2014	148	Óscar se entera que el hijo que espera Tatiana es suyo	7.6	38 minutes
27 March 2014	149	Gervasio y Chabela por fin se casaron	7.6	39 minutes
28 March 2014	150	Rodolfo será capaz de hacer cualquier cosa con tal de quedarse con el dinero de Tatiana	7.4	41 minutes
29 March 2014	151	El amor de Tatiana y Óscar fue sellado con un beso de amor frente al altar	10.9	40 minutes
