= Arantxa =

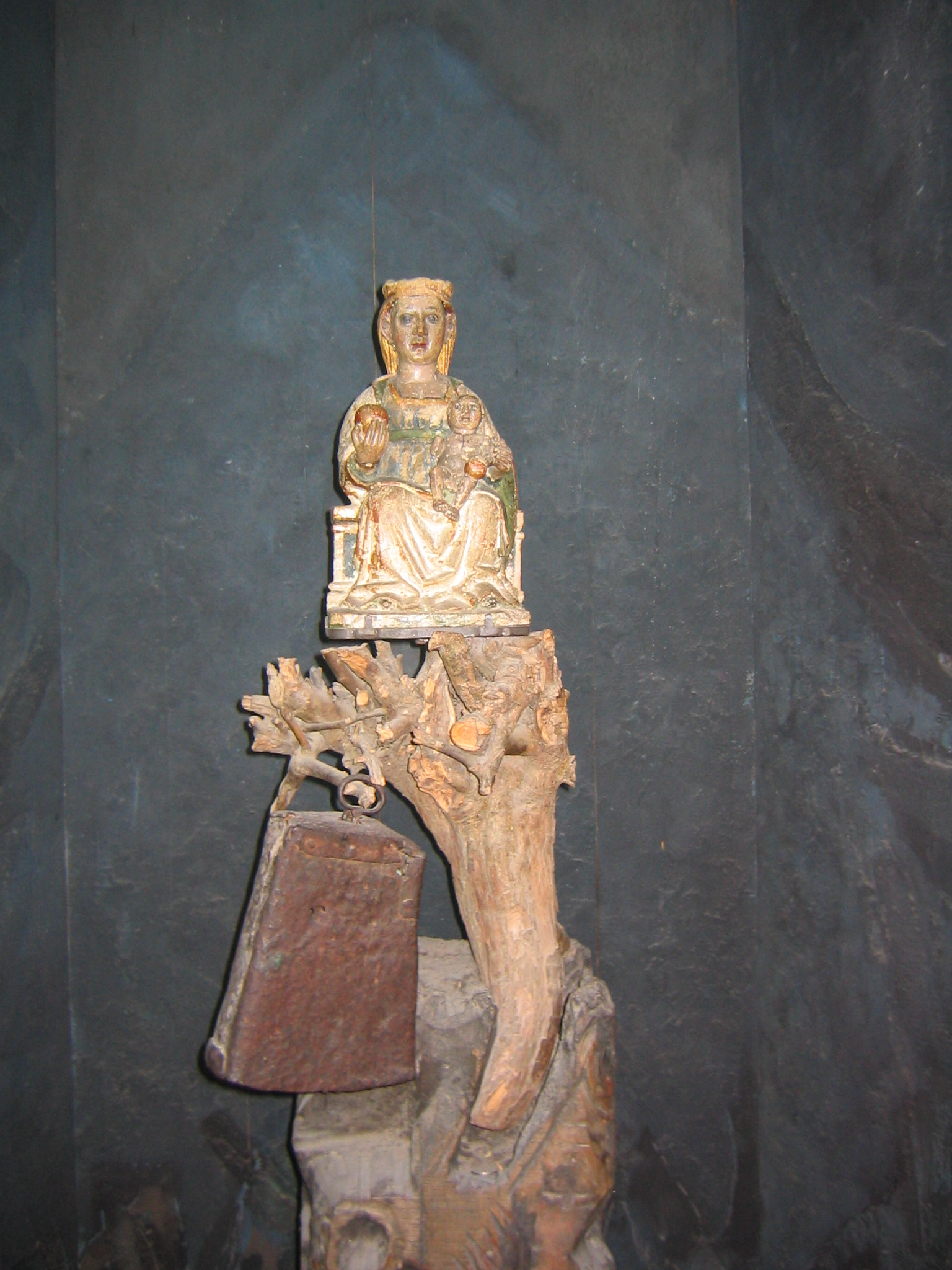
- Our Lady of Arantzazu
- Gender: Female
- Language: Basque

Origin
- Meaning: thornbush

Other names
- Alternative spelling: Arantza
- See also: Arantzazu

Arantxa or Arantza is a Basque feminine given name, meaning "thornbush". It is a hypocoristic for Arantzazu, which is derived from Our Lady of Arantzazu, a shrine of Mary, mother of Jesus, in Gipuzkoa.

== Arantxa ==
People with the name Arantxa include:

- Arantxa Castilla-La Mancha (born 1997), Spanish drag queen
- Arantxa King (born 1989), Bermudian athlete
- Arantxa Ochoa (born 1974), Spanish ballet dancer
- Arantxa Parra Santonja (born 1982), Spanish tennis player
- Arantxa Rus (born 1990), Dutch tennis player
- Arantxa Sánchez Vicario (born 1971), Spanish tennis player
- Arantxa Urretabizkaia (born 1947), Spanish writer

== Arantza ==
People with the name Arantza include:

- Arantza Arruti (1946–2025), Spanish politician
- Arantza Díaz de Ilarraza Sánchez (born 1957), Spanish computer scientist
- Arantza Ezenarro (born 1980), Spanish soprano
- Arantza Gumucio (born 1989), Chilean sailor
- Arantza Loureiro (born 1981), Spanish athlete
- Arantza Moreno (born 1995), Spanish athlete
- Arantza del Puerto (born 1971), Spanish footballer
- Arantza Quiroga Cía (born 1973), Spanish politician
- Arantza Urkaregi (born 1954), Spanish mathematician
