= Corazón en condominio =

Mexican telenovela

- Genre: Comedy; Romance; Drama
- Created by: Ana Fernanda Fernández; Carlos Fernández de Soto; Andrea Soto
- Based on: Vecinos (2008)
- Written by: José Luis Durán Rojas; Verónica Suárez
- Directed by: Rafael Gutiérrez Rodríguez; Carlos Ángel Guerra Villareal
- Starring: Victor García; Cynthia Rodríguez; Arap Bethke; Betty Monroe; Luis Felipe Tovar; Martha Mariana Castro; Alberto Guerra
- Opening theme: "Corazón en Condominio" by Victor García y Cynthia Rodríguez
- Country of origin: Mexico
- Original language: Spanish
- No. of episodes: 151 (list of episodes)

Production
- Executive producers: Rafael Gutiérrez Rodríguez; Elisa Salinas; Pedro Lira
- Producer: Pedro Luévano
- Production locations: Mexico City, Mexico
- Camera setup: Multi-camera
- Running time: 40–44 minutes
- Production company: Azteca

Original release
- Network: Azteca Trece
- Release: 2 September 2013 – 29 March 2014

Related
- Destino; Luisana mía

Corazón en condominio (Lucky Me) is a Mexican telenovela produced by Azteca in 2013. It stars Victor García and Cynthia Rodríguez as the main protagonists. It is based on Vecinos, a Colombian telenovela by Caracol. On 2 September 2013, Azteca started broadcasting Corazón en Condominio at 7:30pm, replacing Destino. The last episode was broadcast on 29 March 2014.

Corazón en Condominio has started filming since 1 August 2013.

== Cast ==
Actor	Character	Description
Victor García	Óscar	
Cynthia Rodríguez	Tatiana	
Arap Bethke	Rodolfo	Tatiana's boyfriend, Jessica's lover
Betty Monroe	Jessica	Óscar's girlfriend
Omar Fierro	Gervasio	
Luis Felipe Tovar	Alvaro	
Mayra Rojas	Chabela	
Martha Mariana Castro	Licha	Jessica's mother
Carmen Beato	Clara	
Humberto Búa	Roberto	
Alan Ciangherotti	Macario	
Melina Robert	Maria Teresa	
Laura Palma	Paty	
Gloria Stalina	Nicole	
María Alejandra Molina	Sarita	
Adianez Hernandez	Tata	
Rykardo Hernandez	Poncho	
Alex Garza	Yolanda	
