= La loba (TV series) =

- Genre: Telenovela
- Created by: Bethel Flores
- Story by: Patricia Palmer
- Directed by: José Acosta; Lorena Maza; Alberto Santini Lara
- Creative director: Enrique Pineda
- Starring: Mauricio Islas; Ivonne Montero; Regina Torné; Omar Fierro; Gabriela Roel; Anna Ciocchetti
- Theme music composer: Jorge Avendaño
- Opening theme: "Las leyes del corazón" performed by Ana Gabriel
- Country of origin: Mexico
- Original language: Spanish
- No. of episodes: 175

Production
- Executive producer: José Solano Rodríguez
- Producer: María del Carmen Marcos
- Editors: Miguel Sánchez; Fernando Rodríguez; Rigel Sosa Andrade
- Camera setup: Multi-camera

Original release
- Network: Azteca Trece
- Release: February 8 – October 8, 2010

Related
- Pasión morena; Entre el amor y el deseo

La Loba (Fierce Angel) is a Mexican telenovela by TV Azteca. It premiered on 2010. The protagonists are the international stars Ivonne Montero and Mauricio Islas. Grand actors such as Regina Torne, Omar Fierro, Anna Ciocchetti, Fernando Becerril, and Marta Aura also included as cast members.

== Original version ==
Patricia Palmer created the original Argentine version, Los Angeles No Lloran. It was produced by Patricia Palmer, Alberto Marchi and Alejandro Moser. The original stars are Orlando Carrio and Patricia Palmer. Theme song in this version is also by Patricia Palmer.

Patricia Palmer joined the cast as Mina in La Loba.

== Cast ==
=== Main ===
- Mauricio Islas as Emiliano Alcázar
- Ivonne Montero as Ángeles Fernández "La Loba"
- Regina Torné as Doña Prudencia Gutiérrez de Alcázar
- Omar Fierro as Ignacio Alcázar
- Gabriela Roel as María Segovia / Lucrecia Aragonés del Águila "La Princesa"
- Anna Ciocchetti as Noelia Torres Velázquez

=== Recurring ===
- Patricia Bernal as Colette Vennua
- Rossana Nájera as Yolanda "Yoli" Contreras
- Mauricio Barcelata as Tito
- Ramiro Huerta as Fabián
- Miguel Ángel Ferriz as Alejandro Alcázar / Antonio Alcázar
- Fernando Becerril as Luis Fernández
- Marta Aura as Teresa Gutiérrez
- Surya MacGregor as Eugenia Torres Velázquez de Alcázar
- Ana Belena as Felicia Yrigoyen Nahman
- Paloma Woolrich as Manuela
- Ana Silvia Garza as Zule
- Sylvia Saenz as María José "Marijo" Alcázar Torres Velázquez
- Luis Miguel Lombana as Salvador Fabiri
- Gabriela Canudas as Claudia Gómez
- Juan Vidal as Alberto Colombo
- Julieta Egurrola as Carmen de la Garza Ruíz "La Güera"
- Javier Díaz Dueñas as Montemayor
- Patricia Palmer as La Mina

== Production ==
- Due to success of this telenovela, Azteca Novelas chosen Maricarmen to produce its replacement, Entre el amor y el deseo.
- Mauricio Islas, Regina Torne, Ramiro Huerta and Jorge Luis Vazquez reunite in Cielo rojo, a 2011 telenovela which replaced Entre el amor y el deseo.
- Omar Fierro and Anna Ciocchetti had portrayed villain together in Vuélveme A Querer.
- Ana Belena, Anna Ciocchetti and Gabriela Roel reunite in Huérfanas, a 2011 telenovela.

== Remake ==
- La loba was remade as Lara Aishah in Malaysia by Global Station Sdn Bhd, which its last episode premiered 12 January 2017.
