= Regina Torné =

Mexican actress (1944–2026)

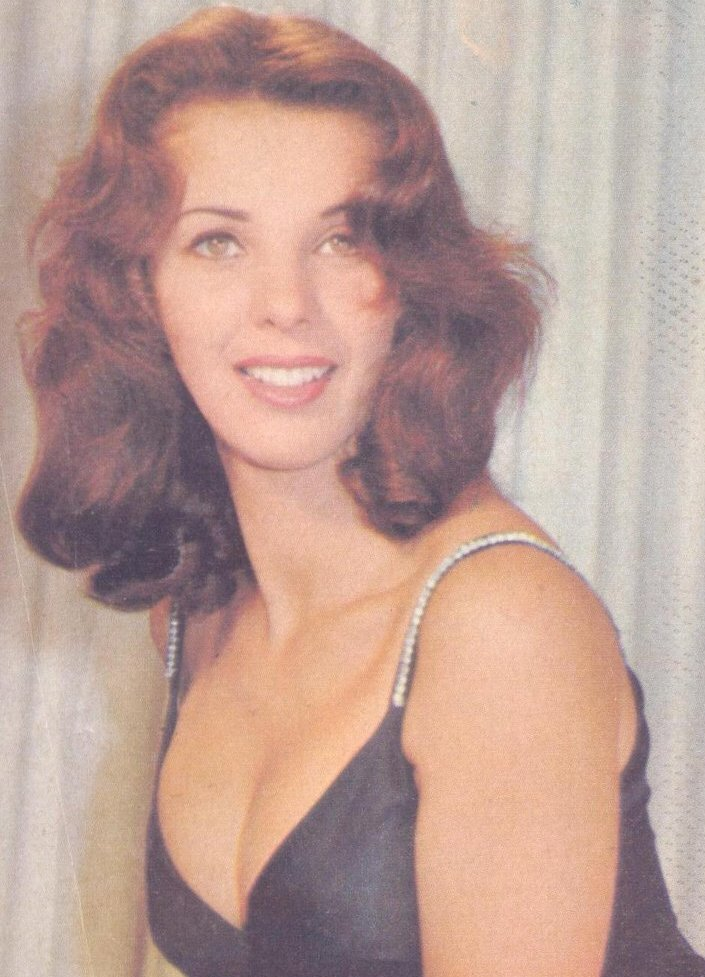
- Torné, c. 1966
- Born: Rosa Virgen del Pilar Martina Incháustegui Anaya; 21 July 1944; Villahermosa, Tabasco, Mexico
- Died: 11 November 2026 (aged 82); Mexico City, Mexico
- Occupation: Actress
- Years active: 1966–2016

Rosa Virgen del Pilar Martina Incháustegui Anaya (21 July 1944 – 11 November 2026), known professionally as Regina Torné, was a Mexican actress. In addition to a lengthy career in Mexican cinema, she played Gloria in the television series El Chavo del Ocho.

== Life and career ==
Torné was born on 21 July 1944 in Villahermosa, Tabasco; she was the daughter of Pedro Salvador Incháustegui Rueda and Pilar Anaya, and had an older sister. Although born on Mexican soil, she was raised in the United States, where her parents had sent her for her academic education. She did not return to Mexico until she was eighteen, having received a scholarship to study theatrical acting; by that time, she had already completed university-level studies and was fluent in three languages: English, French, and Italian.

Torné died at her home in Mexico City, on 11 November 2026, at the age of 82.

== Telenovelas and series ==
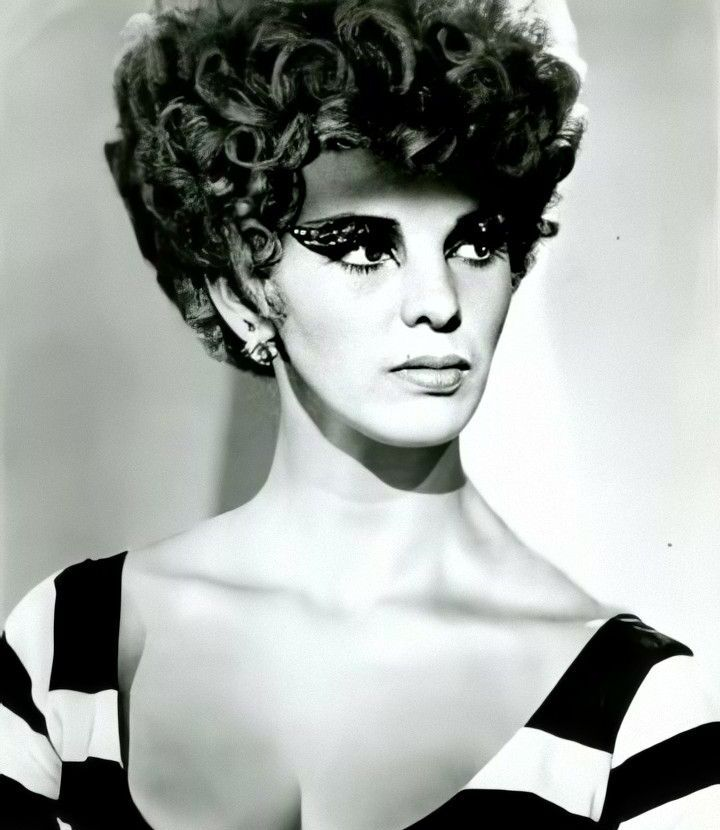
Torné in The Big Cube (1969)

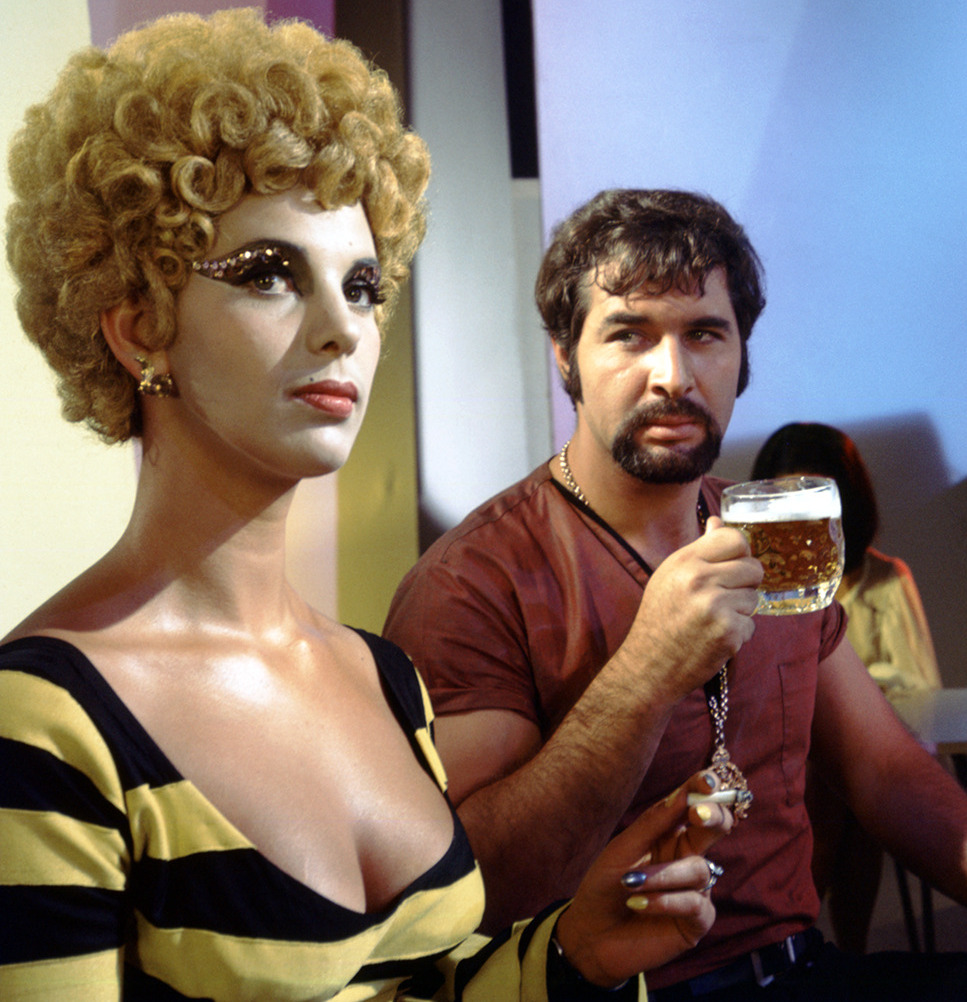
Torné with Rogelio Guerra in a publicity photo for the film The Big Cube (1969)

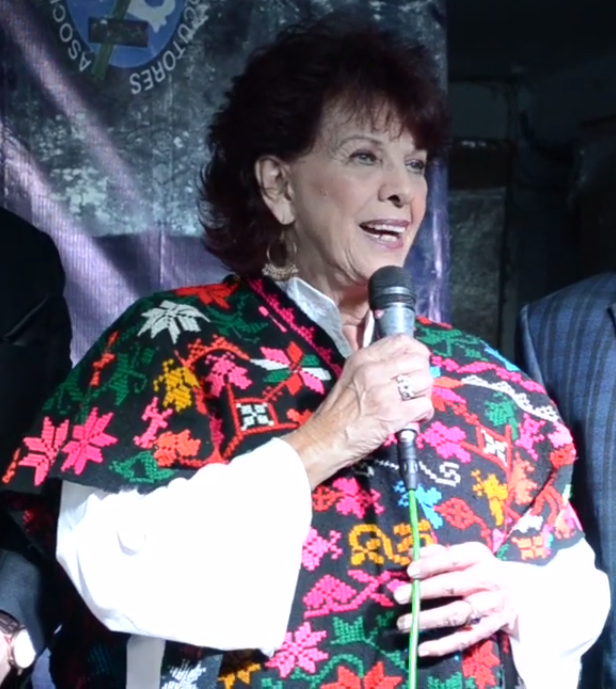
Torné in 2018

- 2014 – Siempre Tuya Acapulco – Soraya Patiño
- 2011 – Cielo Rojo – Loreto Encinas
- 2010 – La Loba – Prudencia Gutiérrez viuda de Alcázar
- 2009 – Nikte – Diosa Luna / Meztli
- 2008 – Helena's Cry
- 2007 – La Niñera – Miss Emilia
- 2004 – Belinda – Eloísa Fuenmayor
- 2002 – Por ti – Francisca
- 2002 – Lo que callamos las mujeres – Doña Cruz
- 2001 – Como en el cine – Romualda
- 2000 – El Amor no es como lo pintan – Engracia Valdés de Galán
- 1999 – Catalina y Sebastián – Antonieta
- 1998 – La Chacala – Consuelo
- 1998 – Chiquititas – Soraya Rocche
- 1997 – Rivales por accidente – Viviana
- 1995 – Retrato de família – Miriam
- 1994 – Caminos Cruzados – Katy
- 1994 – Agujetas de color de rosa – Sabrina
- 1993 – Clarisa – Doña Beatriz de Bracho Sanabria
- 1988 – Camara infraganti – Lilian Moreno
- 1982 – Chispita – Sarah Lovato
- 1979 – El Chavo del Ocho – Glória
- 1978 – Rosalía – Aurora
- 1968 – I Spy – Elena (episode "Turnabout For Traitors")

== Films ==
- 2009 – Mi vida por ti – Diana San Román
- 1996 – Simple mortal – Liliana
- 1991 – Como agua para chocolate – Mamá Elena
- 1992 – Tú puedes, si quieres – Coñi
- 1977 – Capulina Chisme Caliente – Geraldine
- 1976 – Tiempo y destiempo – Cristiana
- 1974 – Viento salvaje – Verónica Dínar
- 1972 – Hijos de Satanás
- 1969 – La señora Muerte – Marlene
- 1969 – Al fin a solas
- 1969 – Blue Demon contra las invasoras
- 1969 – Mujeres de medianoche – Mabel
- 1969 – El Crepúsculo de un dios
- 1969 – Las Infieles
- 1969 – The Big Cube – Queen Bee
- 1969 – Pacto diabólico
- 1969 – Las Luchadoras contra el robot asesino – Gaby
- 1968 – Las de oros
- 1968 – Los Asesinos – Angela Nelson
- 1968 – The Chinese Room – Sidonia Campos
- 1968 – Bajo el imperio del hampa'
- 1968 – Los Canallas'
- 1967 – Dos pintores pintorescos – Diana
- 1967 – El Asesino se embarca – Paula
- 1967 – Pistoleros de la frontera
- 1967 – Rocambole contra las mujeres arpías
- 1967 – Adios cuñado
- 1966 – Jinetes de la llanura
- 1966 – El Rata
- 1966 – El Temerario
- 1966 – Solo de noche vienes
- 1966 – Nosotros los jóvenes
- 1966 – Despedida de soltera – Pilar
