= Betty Monroe =

Mexican actress

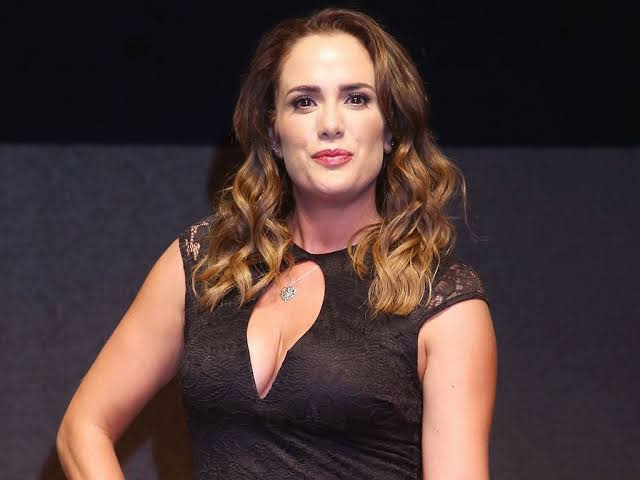
- Born: Beatriz Monroy Alarcón; March 4, 1978 (age 48); Guadalajara, Jalisco, Mexico
- Occupations: Actress; model
- Years active: 1996-present

Beatriz Monroy Alarcón, professionally known as Betty Monroe (born March 4, 1978) is a Mexican actress and model.

== Career ==
=== Early career beginnings; 1991-2000 ===
Betty has been quite notable for playing villainous roles in several productions. She started off her career in 1998 when she starred in the telenovela Tres veces Sofia, a TV Azteca. She played a minor role as a secretary. Later that year she later played in a telenovela, Perla that was topbilled by Silvia Navarro and Leonardo García.

=== 2000-2003; El amor no es como lo pintan, Como en el cine, La hija del jardinero ===
In 2000, she portrayed Marisela Aguilera in El amor no es como lo pintan, a telenovela by TV Azteca. In 2001, she starred in another Azteca Production Como en el cine, a telenovela that had Lorena Rojas as the leading lady. In 2003, she returned to the small screen in La hija del jardinero. She played Adreina Torres.

=== 2004-2009; Bellezas indomables ===
In the year 2007, she appeared in Bellezas indomables as the antagonist; Berenice; a vicious, calculating woman that marries a much elder man and does everything in her power to get the fortune of her husband even if she has to leave her step-daughters in the streets. The telenovela starred, Yahir, Claudia Álvarez and Tomas Goros.

=== 2010-2014; Cielo rojo, La mujer de Judas, Corazón en condominio, Las Bravo ===
She made her comeback in telenovelas, starring in Cielo rojo She played Sofia a divorcee. In 2012, she played in La mujer de Judas. In 2013, she was one of the stars in Corazón en condominio. In 2014, she made an appearance in Las Bravo. She played Candela Milan. The telenovela had Edith González, Mauricio Islas and Saúl Lisazo

=== 2015-present; Sueño de amor ===
In 2016, she has been confirmed to star in Juan Osorio's new production, Sueño de amor. She plays Esperanza Guerrero, a loving mother of two adolescents and the main protagonist of the telenovela.

== Filmography ==
Year	Project	Character	Notes	Network
1998	Trece Veces Sofia	Secretary		TV Azteca
1998	Perla	Guadalupe "Lupita"		TV Azteca
2000	El amor no es como lo pintan	Marisela Aguilera		TV Azteca
2001	Como en el cine	Rubí "Ángela" de Billetes		TV Azteca
2003	La hija del jardinero	Andreina Torres		TV Azteca
2007	Bellezas indomables	Berenice Díaz Ojeda Vda. de Urquillo		TV Azteca
2011	Cielo rojo	Sofía Márquez de Molina		TV Azteca
2012	La mujer de Judas	Galilea Del Toro Batista		TV Azteca
2013	Corazón en condominio	Jessica		TV Azteca
2014	Las Bravo	Candela Millán	Guest star	TV Azteca
2015	Un escenario para amar	Zoila Lezama		TV Azteca
2016	Sueño de amor	Esperanza Guerrero Díaz	Protagonist	Televisa
2017	Como dice el dicho			Televisa
2017	Muy padres	Margarita Rivapalacio		Imagen Television
