= Partita (Dallapiccola) =

Musical composition by Luigi Dallapiccola

The Partita for orchestra with a solo soprano (Alla memoria di Ernesto Consolo) by the Italian composer Luigi Dallapiccola was composed between 1930 and 1932.

Partita is the work with which Dallapiccola first came to international recognition. Written in memory of the Italian pianist Ernesto Consolo, it is scored in four movements for orchestra, with a soprano solo in the final movement. In a manner analogous to the finale of Mahler's Fourth Symphony, the setting is a childlike medieval Latin lullaby.

The work was premiered at the Teatro Comunale, Florence, on 22 January 1933 by the theatre orchestra under Vittorio Gui, with Laura Pasini as soloist.

== Movements ==
The piece has four movements:

1. Passacaglia. Molto solenne
2. Burlesca. Presto ma non troppo – Pochissimo meno – Un poco più mosso – Moderato – Tempo del principio – Tumultoso
3. Recitativo e Fanfara. Violento – Calmo – Un poco mosso, ma sempre calmo – Molto più lento, trascinato – Ancora movendo – Molto mosso – Animato – Violento
4. Naenia B.M.V. ("Lullaby of the Blessed Virgin Mary"), with soprano solo. Molto tranquillo – Pochissimo più mosso – Molto tranquillo – Soavissimo – Un poco piu animato – Un poco largamente – Animando – Come prima (Animato) – Molto tranquillo – Celestiale

== Recordings ==
- RAI Symphony Orchestra of Turin, Sergiu Celibidache (conductor), Bruna Rizzoli (soprano), recorded 1968, Turin, released Stradivarius Records STR 13608, 1989.
- BBC Philharmonic, Gianandrea Noseda (conductor), Gillian Keith (soprano), recorded 2009, Manchester, released Chandos Records CHAN 10561, 2010.
- Staatsphilharmonie Rheinland-Pfalz, Karl-Heinz Steffens (conductor), Arantza Ezenarro (soprano) recorded 2014, Ludwigshafen, released Capriccio Records C5214, 2014.
