= List of Destino episodes =

Destino (Destiny) is a Mexican telenovela produced by Maricarmen Marcos for Azteca. Paola Núñez and Mauricio Islas star as the protagonists.

== Episodes ==
No.	Title	Original release date
1	"Conoce a Valeria una mujer en búsqueda de su Destino"	April 8, 2013
2	"Valeria irá a la cárcel por las acusaciones de Andrea"	April 9, 2013
3	"Sebastián sacó de la cárcel a Valeria, habrá nacido amor entre ellos"	April 10, 2013
4	"Valeria perdió a su mamá, pero se enteró de la verdad de su pasado"	April 11, 2013
5	"Valeria no soporta la idea de tener otra madre y la buscará"	April 12, 2013
6	"Sebastián no quiere problemas con Germán quien arde en celos al encontrarlo con Grecia"	April 15, 2013
7	"La Jennifer encuentra la manera de hacer ver a Valeria como la ladrona"	April 16, 2013
8	"Las dudas sobre la fidelidad de Sebastián harán que Andrea explote."	April 17, 2013
9	"A pesar de las intrigas en contra de Sebastián, Grecia aún desea que trabaje para ella."	April 18, 2013
10	"El plan de la Jennifer y Germán es acabar con Andrea y culpar a Sebatián y a Valeria."	April 19, 2013
11	"Valeria no comprenderá por qué es acusada de la muerte de Andrea"	April 22, 2013
12	"¿Grecia sabrá del romance entre Germán y La Jenifer?"	April 23, 2013
13	"Germán se burla de Sebastián al verlo tras las rejas"	April 24, 2013
14	"Pamela le demostró a Sebastían que está dispuesta a todo por su amor"	April 25, 2013
15	"Pamela aceptó que sigue enamorada del esposo de su hermana muerta"	April 26, 2013
16	"Sebastían está preocupado por el daño que le están haciendo a Valeria"	April 29, 2013
17	"Valeria se volvió a encontrar a Sebastían en su nuevo trabajo"	April 30, 2013
18	"Valeria no tiene miedo de enfrentarse a Victor Urdaneta y demostrarle que es inocente"	May 1, 2013
19	"Grecia no está dispuesta a que Cristina se case con Iñaki, y La Jenifer podría ir a prisión"	May 2, 2013
20	"Valeria ya no se dejará de Gracia del Sol"	May 3, 2013
21	"La Jenifer tiene sentenciados a Germán y al Morro con unas grabaciones"	May 6, 2013
22	"Germán se jugará su trabajo por ayudar a Urdaneta"	May 7, 2013
23	"Urdaneta hará todo por culpar a Sebastián que es amante de Valeria"	May 8, 2013
24	"Cristina creerá la mentira que tramó Elena en contra de Iñaki"	May 9, 2013
25	"Sebastián no sabrá cómo actuar ante la actitud de Víctor Urdaneta"	May 10, 2013
26	"Sebastián le cuenta a Valeria que está destrozado porque su hija ya no está con él"	May 13, 2013
27	"Valeria estará encargada de investigar quién es en realidad Grecia del Sol"	May 14, 2013
28	"Sebastián quiere apoyar a Valeria en la búsqueda de su mamá"	May 15, 2013
29	"Grecia quiere conocer al hombre misterioso y le pesa que sea Valeria su protegida"	May 16, 2013
30	"Elena vio a su padre abrazar a Soledad y quiso saber qué estaba pasando"	May 17, 2013
31	"Pamela se enfrentó con Jenifer y la amenazó con meterla a prisión"	May 20, 2013
32	"El morro logró conseguir los videos que lo culpan de la muerte de Andrea"	May 21, 2013
33	"Valeria y Sebastián estarán cada vez más enamorados, a pesar de los problemas"	May 22, 2013
34	"Elena obliga a Cristina a irse de la cara y escapa con Iñaki"	May 23, 2013
35	"Cristina ha muerto, cómo estará la conciencia de Elena"	May 24, 2013
36	"Grecia no soporta el dolor de ver a su hija muerta"	May 27, 2013
37	"Elena seguirá en el juego con Germán y no dirá nada del accidente"	May 28, 2013
38	"Valeria será de gran apoyo para Iñaki"	May 29, 2013
39	"Sebastián luchará por el amor de Valeria pese a los obstáculos"	May 30, 2013
40	"Germán le dice a Valeria que su lugar se lo arrebató Sebastián Montesinos"	May 31, 2013
41	"Germán advertirá a Elena sobre lo que puede pasar si Gracia descubre que ella mató a su hermana"	June 3, 2013
42	"Sebastián no puede creer que Valeria siga desconfiando de él"	June 4, 2013
43	"Pasaron varios días y Valeria terminó con la deuda que tenía con Sebastián"	June 5, 2013
44	"Rolando desafió a Grecia y un cambio inesperado dio Valeria"	June 6, 2013
45	"Grecia no dejará que Valeria se meta en sus asuntos"	June 7, 2013
46	"Sebastián no permite que Víctor maltrate a Camila"	June 10, 2013
47	"Grecia no permitirá que nadie se interponga entre ella y Sebastián"	June 11, 2013
48	"Valeria siente celos al ver a Grecia del Sol con Sebastián"	June 12, 2013
49	"Camila y Pamela vivirán en la casa de la familia del Sol"	June 13, 2013
50	"Lo más impactante de la semana de Destino"	June 14, 2013
51	"Grecia le pide a Sebastián que no la juzgue por lo que dicen los demás de ella"	June 17, 2013
52	"A Grecia no le importa que su esposo piense que quiere el divorcio para correr con Sebastián"	June 18, 2013
53	"Camila puede descubrir la relación entre Soledad y Rolando"	June 19, 2013
54	"Valeria comienza a tomar decisiones en la empresa Del Sol"	June 20, 2013
55	"Valeria saca las uñas por sus derechos en la empresa del Sol"	June 21, 2013
56	"Valeria abre su corazón y cuenta la verdad sobre su madre"	June 24, 2013
57	"Sebastián está perdidamente enamorado de Valeria, pero a ella no le gusta que se vaya con Grecia"	June 25, 2013
58	"Pamela le pide perdón a Grecia por haber enfrentado a Valeria"	June 26, 2013
59	"Grecia le dice a Sebastián las intensiones que tiene con él"	June 27, 2013
60	"Sebastián le reprocha a Valeria que no confíe en él"	June 28, 2013
61	"Grecia está feliz porque logró que Sebastián vaya con ella a su viaje"	July 1, 2013
62	"Valeria se aliará con Rolando para destruir a Grecia sin saberlo"	July 2, 2013
63	"Grecia se enfrentará a Pamela por la manera en que le hablará"	July 3, 2013
64	"Están a punto de descubrir a Grecia del Sol"	July 4, 2013
65	"La Jenifer fue descubierta por la policía y comenzarán las averiguaciones"	July 5, 2013
66	"Rolando cuenta todo lo que sabe de Grecia del Sol"	July 8, 2013
67	"Rolando también descubre a Grecia con su amante"	July 9, 2013
68	"Sebastián intenta apoyar a Pamela y le pregunta qué le pasó"	July 10, 2013
69	"Valeria y Sebastián se dieron su primer beso de amor"	July 11, 2013
70	"Germán sigue envenenando a Elena en contra de su madre"	July 12, 2013
71	"Sebastián le aclara a Grecia que tiene planes de matrimonio con Valeria"	July 15, 2013
72	"Grecia corre todos los riesgos por desaparecer a Valeria"	July 16, 2013
73	"Grecia logró lo que se proponía, qué pasará con Valeria"	July 17, 2013
74	"Sebastián hará todo por encontrar a Valeria y Camila"	July 18, 2013
75	"Sebastián no viaja con Grecia si no aparecen Camila y Valeria"	July 19, 2013
76	"Víctor Urdaneta vuelve a enfrentarse a Sebastián por su nieta Camila"	July 22, 2013
77	"Sebastián quiere encontrar todas las pruebas para poder enfrentarse a Germán"	July 23, 2013
78	"¿Qué hará Grecia ahora que sabe que El morro es su chofer?"	July 24, 2013
79	"Germán le aconseja a Grecia que Valeria debe morir"	July 25, 2013
80	"Grecia cada vez está más cerca de encontrarse con su pasado"	July 26, 2013
81	"Valeria sabe quién está detrás de su secuestro y es Grecia del Sol"	July 29, 2013
82	"Valeria sabe que Grecia del Sol hizo lo de su secuestro para quedarse con Sebastián"	July 30, 2013
83	"Camila regresó a casa y le dice a Sebastián que Valeria fue la culpable"	July 31, 2013
84	"Grecia seguirá cosechando el odio que Sebastián le tiene ahora a Valeria"	August 1, 2013
85	"Valeria quiere que Sebastián sepa toda la verdad sobre su secuestro"	August 2, 2013
86	"Sebastián dio con el sitio donde tenían a Valeria y a Camila"	August 5, 2013
87	"Elena sabe que Grecia y Germán son amantes por la boca de Soledad"	August 6, 2013
88	"Sebastián está a punto de saber quién secuestró a Camila y Valeria"	August 7, 2013
89	"Elena sabrá que Soledad tiene una hija y quiere saber quién es"	August 8, 2013
90	"Rolando pone en su lugar a Elena por insultar a Soledad, su verdadera madre"	August 9, 2013
91	"Germán le promete a Elena pasar la vida entera a su lado"	August 12, 2013
92	"Grecia recuperó su pañuelo y recuerda el amor que le tuvo a Daniel"	August 13, 2013
93	"Grecia quiere conocer a Venustiano a como de lugar"	August 14, 2013
94	"Sebastián le reclama a Grecia el haber usado a los Urdaneta para sus planes"	August 15, 2013
95	"Sebastián no le dice nada a Grecia sobre su enemigo"	August 16, 2013
96	"Elena quiere que Grecia siga pensando que ella es su única hija"	August 19, 2013
97	"Valeria reta a Grecia para que termine con su trabajo de secuestrarla"	August 20, 2013
98	"Valeria enfrentó a Grecia del Sol frente a Sebastián"	August 21, 2013
99	"¿Germán cobró la vida de otra víctima?"	August 22, 2013
100	"Valeria sabe que su verdadera madre es Grecia del Sol, la mujer que más la odia"	August 23, 2013
101	"El amor triunfará en la última semana de Destino entre Valeria y Sebastián"	August 26, 2013
102	"Grecia le dijo a Valeria que la piensa refundir en la cárcel"	August 27, 2013
103	"Elena le suplicará a Grecia que la perdone por haber ocultado que no era su hija"	August 28, 2013
104	"Grecia recibió un impacto de bala por parte de Germán"	August 29, 2013
105	"Revive el gran final de tu telenovela Destino"	August 30, 2013
