= Destino (2013 TV series) =

2013 Mexican telenovela

- Genre: Telenovela
- Written by: Araceli Monsell; Ana Romero
- Story by: Paz Aguirre; Gabriel Santos
- Directed by: José Acosta; Lorena Maza; Enrique Pineda
- Creative director: Tere Uribe
- Starring: Paola Núñez; Mauricio Islas; Margarita Gralia
- Theme music composer: Agustín Argüello
- Opening theme: "Mi camino es tú amor" performed by Carmen Ríos
- Country of origin: Mexico
- Original language: Spanish
- No. of episodes: 105 (list of episodes)

Production
- Executive producer: Maricarmen Marcos
- Producers: José Solano; Francisco Sosa
- Cinematography: Manuel Palacios
- Editors: Lorenzo Guerra; Fernando Rodríguez
- Camera setup: Multi-camera
- Production company: Azteca

Original release
- Network: Azteca Trece
- Release: April 8 – August 30, 2013

Related
- Quererte así; Corazón en condominio

Destino (Destiny) is a Mexican telenovela produced by Maricarmen Marcos for Azteca. Paola Nuñez and Mauricio Islas star as the protagonists.

== Plot ==
Destino narrates a story where both mother and daughter fall in love with the same man.

== History ==
From April 8 to August 30, 2013, Azteca 13 aired Destino weeknights at 7:30pm. Production officially started on March 7, 2013.

== Cast ==
- Margarita Gralia as Grecia Del Sol/Dulce María
- Paola Núñez as Valeria Gonzalez / Valeria Cabrales Ríos
- Mauricio Islas as Sebastian Montesinos
- Ana La Salvia as Andrea Urdaneta Ramos
- Maria Fernanda Quiroz as Jennifer Fernandez "La Jennifer"
- Maria José Magan as Elena Vargas Del Sol
- Lucía Leyba as Cristina Vargas Del Sol
- Javier Gómez as Rolando Vargas Montero
- Ana Karina Guevara as Soledad Dominguez
- Hugo Catalán as Juan Beltrán "El Morro"
- Jorge Luis Vázquez as Héctor Nava
- Juan Vidal as Germán Aguirre de Alba
- Erick Chapa as Iñaki Herrera
- Araceli Aguilar as Elizabeth Ramos de Urdaneta
- Álvaro Guerrero as Venustiano Cabrales
- Homero Wimmer as Juan José "Padre Juanjo" Reyes Castillo
- Alessandra Pozo as Nuría
- María José Arce as Camila Montesinos Urdaneta
- Socorro Miranda as Ángela Ruiz de Cosio
- Jorge Reyes as Jimenez
- Tamara Fascovich as Guadalupe "Lupita"
- Eugenio Montessoro as Víctor Urdaneta
- Carilo Navarro as Rosa
- Pilar Fernandez as Jazmín
- Mauricio Bonet as Comandante Antonio Cantú
- Arancha as Agente Patricia Cabazos
- Paulette Hernández as Pamela Urdaneta Ramos
- Luisa Garza as Socorro González
- Matias Aranda as Diego
- Adrián Rubio as Enrique Valencia
- Emmanuel Morales as El Pelón
- Luis Morales as Don Aselmo "Chemo"
- Miguel Ángel Ferriz
