= Entre el amor y el deseo =

Mexican telenovela

- Created by: Gilberto Braga
- Developed by: TV Azteca
- Starring: Lorena Rojas; Victor González; Fernando Luján; Margarita Gralia
- Theme music composer: Jorge Avedano
- Opening theme: "Entre el amor y el deseo" by Carlos Rivera
- Country of origin: Mexico
- Original language: Spanish
- No. of episodes: 170

Production
- Producers: Maricarmen Marcos; Alberto Santini Lara
- Production locations: Vancouver, British Columbia, Canada; Mexico City; Riviera Nayarit
- Camera setup: Multi-camera
- Running time: 42 minutes

Original release
- Network: Azteca Trece
- Release: 27 September 2010 – 22 May 2011

Related
- La loba; Cielo rojo; Louco Amor

Entre el Amor y el Deseo (Between Love and Desire) is a Mexican telenovela by TV Azteca. It premiered on 2010. The protagonists are the international stars Lorena Rojas and Víctor González Reynoso. Actors such as Fernando Lujan, Hector Bonilla, Alvaro Guerrero, Veronica Merchant, Paco de la O and Gina Morett were also included as cast members. This telenovela was produced by Maria del Carmen Marcos, after her successful work in La loba. Shooting of this series will start on 9 August 2010. The series premiered on 27 September 2010, at 10pm, sharing La loba's timeslot.

== Plot ==
Luis Carlos is a noble and enthusiastic young man who works with his mother for the Dumont family. Don Edgar Dumont, a kind-hearted man, pays for his studies when he sees the great potential that the young man has to write. At the same time, Claudia, a beautiful young woman and the daughter of a seamstress, goes with her mother to deliver a tablecloth to the Dumont family home, where she meets Luis Carlos and immediately falls in love with him. However, this meeting coincides with the arrival of Andrés, Don Edgar's brother, Renata, Andrés's wife, Felipe, the eldest son, and Patricia, Andrés's promiscuous and capricious daughter. Patricia sets out to seduce Luis Carlos and ends up succeeding, but Renata soon discovers his affairs. That same day a party is held at the Dumont house where Renata is accidentally attacked by the dogs that guard the house, being bitten on the neck.

After this, Renata blames Luis Carlos for having caused what happened and for the scar that will remain for life. As a result of this, Luis Carlos becomes a victim of Renata's wickedness and locks him up in a jail where he is tortured on the orders of this woman. Claudia becomes his only consolation. In addition, he is separated from the son that Patricia is expecting from him. Years go by and Luis Carlos will seek revenge and recover his son with the help of his great love, Claudia.

== Cast ==
- Lorena Rojas as Claudia Fontana
- Víctor González as Luis Carlos Marquez
- Margarita Gralia as Renata Dumont
- Fernando Lujan as Edgar Dumont
- Hector Bonilla as Alfredo
- Alexandra Graña as Patricia Dumont
- Martha Aura as Elvira
- Alvaro Guerrero as Fernando
- Verónica Merchant as Muriel
- Francisco de la O as Guillermo De la Garza
- Mauricio Aspe as Marcio Garcia
- Cinthia Vazquez as Sofia
- Gina Moret as Isolda
- Jorge Luis Vazquez as Felipe
- Cecilia Ponce as Sara
- Pedro Sicard as Rafael Valdivieso Eliade
- Sergio Klainer as Sergio Valdivieso
- Eugenio Montessoro as Andres Dumont
- Amaranta Ruiz as Gisela
- Mauricio Bonet as Adriano
- Cecilia Piñeiro as Lucia De la Garza
- Dino Garcia as Walter
- Carmen del Valle as Beatriz de De la Garza
- Fernando Rubio as Jeronimo
- Estela Calderon as Dominica
- Angeles Marin as Ana Maria
- Veronica Teran as Raquel
- Adrian Herrera as Gabrielito
- Abel Fernando as Acuña
- Marina Vera as Denise
- Ernesto Diaz del Castillo as Edy
- Ximena Pichel as Estela
- Beatriz Cecilia as Magda
- Paulette Hernández as Monica
- Yolanda Zuñiga as Toña
- Jose Astorga as Maurice
- Anibal Navarro as Bernardo
- Fania Barron as Marilu
- Emilio Ramos as Ramoncito

== Theme songs ==
=== "Entre El Amor y El Deseo" ===
Singer: Carlos Rivera
Writer: Daniel del Rincon Vazquez, Benjamin Rojas Lejia
Editor: TV Azteca Publishing
Copyright Azteca Musica

=== "Vamos hacer de cuenta" ===
Singer: JC Sanchez
Music: Lorena Rojas
Writer: Lorena Rojas, Rodolfo Castillo

=== "Mirame" ===
Singer: JC Sanchez
Music: Lorena Rojas
Writer: Lorena Rojas, Rodolfo Castillo

=== "Mesa para dos" ===
Singer: Lorena Rojas
Music: Lorena Rojas
Writer: Lorena Rojas, Rodolfo Castillo

=== "Sin ti no se" ===
Singer: Lorena Rojas
Music: Lorena Rojas, arreglos Kike Santander
Writer: Lorena Rojas

=== "De acuerdo" ===
Singer: Lorena Rojas
Music: Lorena Rojas
Writer: Lorena Rojas, Rodolfo Castillo
