= Rosalía (TV series) =

- Genre: Telenovela
- Created by: Carlos Enrique Taboada
- Directed by: Noé Alcántara
- Starring: Rosalía Valdés; Juan Pelaez
- Country of origin: Mexico
- Original language: Spanish

Production
- Executive producer: Guillermo Diazayas
- Cinematography: Carlos Enrique Taboada

Original release
- Network: Canal de las Estrellas
- Release: 1978

Rosalía is a Mexican telenovela produced by Guillermo Diazayas for Televisa in 1978.

== Cast ==
- Rosalía Valdés as Rosalía
- Juan Pelaez as René
- Salvador Pineda as Leonel
- Lilia Michell as Leticia
- Rafael Baledón as Roberto
- Lilia Aragón as Hortencia
- Victoria Vera as Marcia
- Regina Torné as Aurora
- Erika Carrasco as Silvia
- Alma Delfina
