= Bellezas Indomables =

Mexican telenovela

- Created by: Leonardo Bechini; Oscar Tabernise
- Developed by: TV Azteca
- Starring: Claudia Álvarez; Yahir; Betty Monroe
- Opening theme: Márcame la piel (performed by Yahir)
- Country of origin: Mexico
- Original language: Spanish
- No. of episodes: 180

Production
- Executive producer: José Solano
- Producer: Carlos Márquez
- Production location: Cabo San Lucas, México
- Camera setup: Multi-camera
- Running time: 45 minutes

Original release
- Network: Azteca Trece
- Release: July 30, 2007 – February 22, 2008

Bellezas Indomables (a.k.a. Untamed Beauties) is a Mexican telenovela/soap opera.

== Story ==
Fernanda, Angeles, and Soledad are three sisters, very different from each other, but with the same desire to compete for the love of their father, Rodrigo, a man who meets all their whims. Since they were very small when they lost their mother in what they know was an accident, they grew up under the care of Guadeloupe, their Nana, and next to Manuel, the son of Guadeloupe, with Fernanda, who has always felt a strong attraction but she has refused to the poor condition of the boy.

Berenice, the evil woman of Rodrigo, who is twice their age and who lives to manipulate and succeeds in becoming the wife of the father of three girls. The new marriage moves and the father becomes a shadow for their daughters. Berenice slowly poisons Rodrigo and his health deteriorates. Angeles, already desperate to not see her father, caught their stepmother and Gregorio, her long-time partner, kissing. In the midst of despair, Gregorio asks his bodyguard, Diego, who will do anything to protect his daughter, to kill Angeles. He goes after Angeles and is ordered to kill her, but he can’t follow through. He lets her live in his secret house where he cares for and protects her. She later realizes that her sisters, Fernanda and Soledad, were worried about her when she does not appear. She further discovers that her father Rodrigo also died in a tragedy.

The lives of the girls are changing radically and have been stripped of all their property, a situation that Gregorio takes advantage of and offers Fernanda care and protection in exchange for being lovers. Fernanda still loves Manuel in silence, but accepts the plan to avenge her father and enters into poverty. Soledad enters a convent to finish high school away from so much suffering. Meanwhile, Fernanda starts a clothing business with the money Gregorio gave to her and continues to support Manuel, who under any circumstance is willing to help them rebuild their lives. It is there, amidst the struggles and hidden affection, that the beautiful love that exists between them is strengthened.

Gradually, Fernanda takes the courage to confront Gregorio and Berenice, search for her sisters, live without chains, and continually love Manuel.

== Cast ==
- Claudia Álvarez - MARIA FERNANDA URQUILLO
- Yahir - MANUEL VILLAZÓN
- Cynthia Vázquez - MARÍA ÁNGELES URQUILLO / ANNA HERNANDEZ
- Marcela Ruiz - MARÍA ÁNGELES URQUILLO
- Carlos Torres - DIEGO LOPEZ
- Natalia Farias - MARIA SOLEDAD URQUILLO
- Fernando Alonso - IGNACIO TORREJÓN
- Tomás Goros - GREGORIO TORREJÓN
- Betty Monroe - BERENICE DÍAZ OJEDA viuda de URQUILLO
- Alberto Casanova - JUAN LOPEZ
- Carmen Delgado - CARMEN SEGURA DE LOPEZ
- Mayra Rojas - GUADALUPE VILLAZÓN
- Fernando Sarfatti - RODRIGO URQUILLO
- Angélica Magaña - LOURDES
- María de la Fuente - ROXANA
- Eduardo Reza - LUIS
- Sylvia Saenz - BRENDA
- Claudia Cervantes - VIRGINIA
- Karla Rico - SISTER VICTORIA
- Lariza Mendizabal - SISTER ISABEL
- Andrea Escalona - MARA
- Nancy Barrera - ROSITA LOPEZ
- Adrian Herrera - PABLITO
- Aline Hernández - SABRINA
- Raúl Osorio - JÍMENEZ
- Joejenina Transporte - GABRIELLA

== Broadcast international ==
=== Asia and Pacific ===
- Bellezas Indomables, also known as Untamed Beauties, was successfully launched in the Philippines via TV5 (replacing ABC-5) last August 11, 2008 dubbed in Tagalog.

=== Africa ===
Bellezas Indomable, was launched in Kenya in 2012 by KTN dubbed in English

Bellezas Indomable, was launched in Nigeria in 2012 by AIT dubbed in English

=== Americas ===
- Bellezas Indomables was successfully launched in Uruguay via VTV from April 12 to October 15, 2010 Monday to Friday at 17:00.
- Bellezas Indomables was successfully launched in Paraguay via Paravisión from September 14, 2009 to April 15, 2010 Monday to Friday at 12:30. Reruns of Bellezas Indomables via VTV Plus (Channels 8 and 706 from VCC).
- Bellezas Indomables was successfully launched in Argentina via CN23 from January 4 to June 3, 2010 Monday to Friday at 17:00. Reruns of Bellezas Indomables via Vivra (HD signal only in the Channel 41.1 in Digital Terrestrial Televisión or DTT).
