= The Big Cube =

1969 Mexican-American film by Tito Davison

- Theatrical poster
- Directed by: Tito Davison
- Written by: William Douglas Lansford
- Story by: Edmundo Báez; Tito Davidson
- Produced by: Francisco Diaz Barroso; Lindsley Parsons
- Starring: Lana Turner; Karin Mossberg; George Chakiris; Daniel O'Herlihy; Richard Egan
- Cinematography: Gabriel Figueroa
- Edited by: Carlos Savage
- Music by: Val Johns
- Distributed by: Warner Bros.-Seven Arts
- Release date: April 30, 1969
- Running time: 98 minutes
- Countries: Mexico; United States
- Language: English
- Budget: $560,000

The Big Cube is a 1969 Mexican-American psychological thriller film directed by Tito Davison and starring Lana Turner, Karin Mossberg, George Chakiris, Daniel O'Herlihy, and Richard Egan. Its plot follows an aging former actress who is dosed with LSD by her malicious stepdaughter, seeking to drive her mad and obtain her fortune. It is notable for its aggressive portrayal of LSD use and the 1960s youth counterculture as vicious evils.

== Plot ==
Adriana Roman, a successful stage actress, retires to marry Charles Winthrop, a wealthy tycoon. Winthrop's daughter, Lisa, is instantly distrustful of Adriana solely because she is "the other woman" taking her father's affection.

Charles is killed in a boating accident, which also leads to Adriana suffering from a concussion. Lisa's new boyfriend Johnny Allen, a womanizing, fortune-hunting medical student, capitalizes on that distrust to persuade Lisa that her father's death was murder, a charge exacerbated by Adriana's threat—as per her late husband's instructions as laid out in his will, for which Adriana is executor—to disinherit Lisa if she marries Johnny.

Johnny conspires with Lisa to lace Adriana's prescribed sedatives with enough LSD to drive her insane. During one of the episodes, Adriana hallucinates that Johnny and Lisa are attempting to throw her over a cliffside after taking her on a drive into the country. Later, while Adriana has further LSD-induced hallucinations at home, Johnny plays pre-recorded subliminal messages to further drive her crazy, one of which instructs Adriana to leap from a window—Lisa is unaware of this scheme. As Adriana is about to jump to her probable death, Lisa saves her. While still unaware of Johnny's true intent, Lisa continues with their plan and Adriana is committed to a mental hospital, where they have Adriana declared legally insane and thus unable to carry out her obligations in Charles' will.

After their wedding, Johnny demonstrates that he doesn't really love Lisa by openly seducing other women, most notably Lisa's free-spirited best friend, Bibi. Johnny bribes Lisa to divorce him by providing a $100,000 settlement in return for keeping silent about what they did to Adriana. Lisa does divorce him, but instead of succumbing to Johnny's threats, she decides to come clean to Frederick Lansdale, a playwright friend of Adriana's who has always loved her himself, about what she and Johnny did. By this time, Adriana is suffering from amnesia, still believing that Charles is alive.

Frederick decides to write a play detailing Adriana's traumatic experiences and casts her in the lead role. He hopes that replaying her experience on stage will cure her. By the opening performance, Adriana has glimpses from her memory of what has happened, not fully realizing what those fleeting thoughts are.

By the climactic third act of the play, which details the tape-recorded subliminal messages Lisa and Johnny played during Adriana's hallucinations, Frederick decides to play the actual recordings with Lisa and Johnny's voices. This brings Adriana back to reality. She recognizes the voices and the fact that Lisa and Johnny use her real name as opposed to her character's name in the play. Lisa rushes onto the stage, admitting to Adriana what she and Johnny did. In a rage, Adriana slaps Lisa in the face.

The play and Adriana's performance are a huge hit, Adriana and Frederick are about to be married, and Lisa has reconciled with Adriana. Meanwhile, Johnny has begun taking his own LSD while being shunned by his so-called friends. He is last seen on the floor in the midst of an LSD trip.

== Cast ==
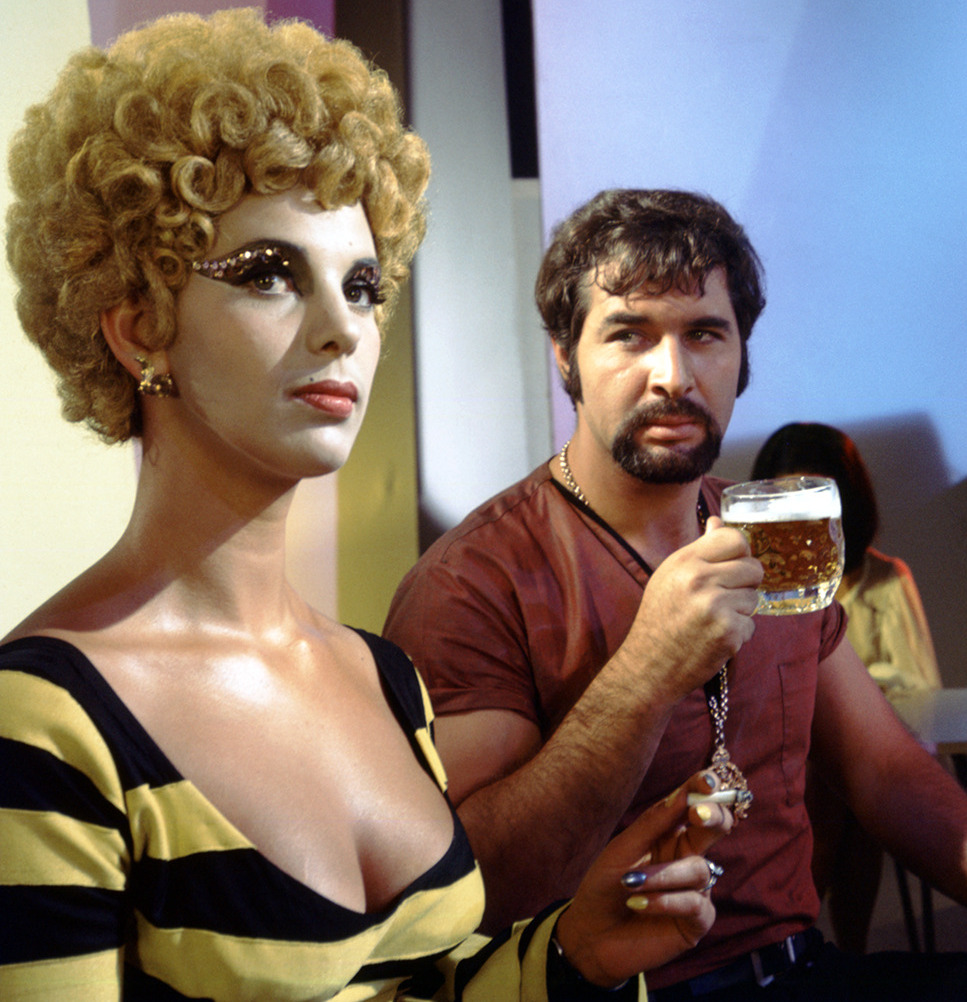
Regina Torné and Rogelio Guerra in a publicity photo for the film

- Lana Turner as Adriana Roman
- George Chakiris as Johnny Allen
- Richard Egan as Frederick Lansdale
- Daniel O'Herlihy as Charles Winthrop
- Karin Mossberg as Lisa Winthrop
- Pamela Rodgers as Bibi
- Carlos East as Lalo
- Augusto Benedico as Dr. Lorenz
- Victor Junco as Delacroix
- Norma Herrera as Stella
- Pedro Galván as University Dean
- Regina Torne as Queen Bee
- Rogelio Guerra as David Brandt - Queen Bee's Bodyguard (uncredited)

== Production ==
=== Development ===
The film was based on a story by Tito Davison and Edmundo Báez, the former of whom served as director. In January 1968, Motion Pictures International (MPI) negotiated a co-production agreement with the Mexico-based Producciones Anco to produce the film, based on a screenplay written by William Douglas Lansford.

=== Casting ===
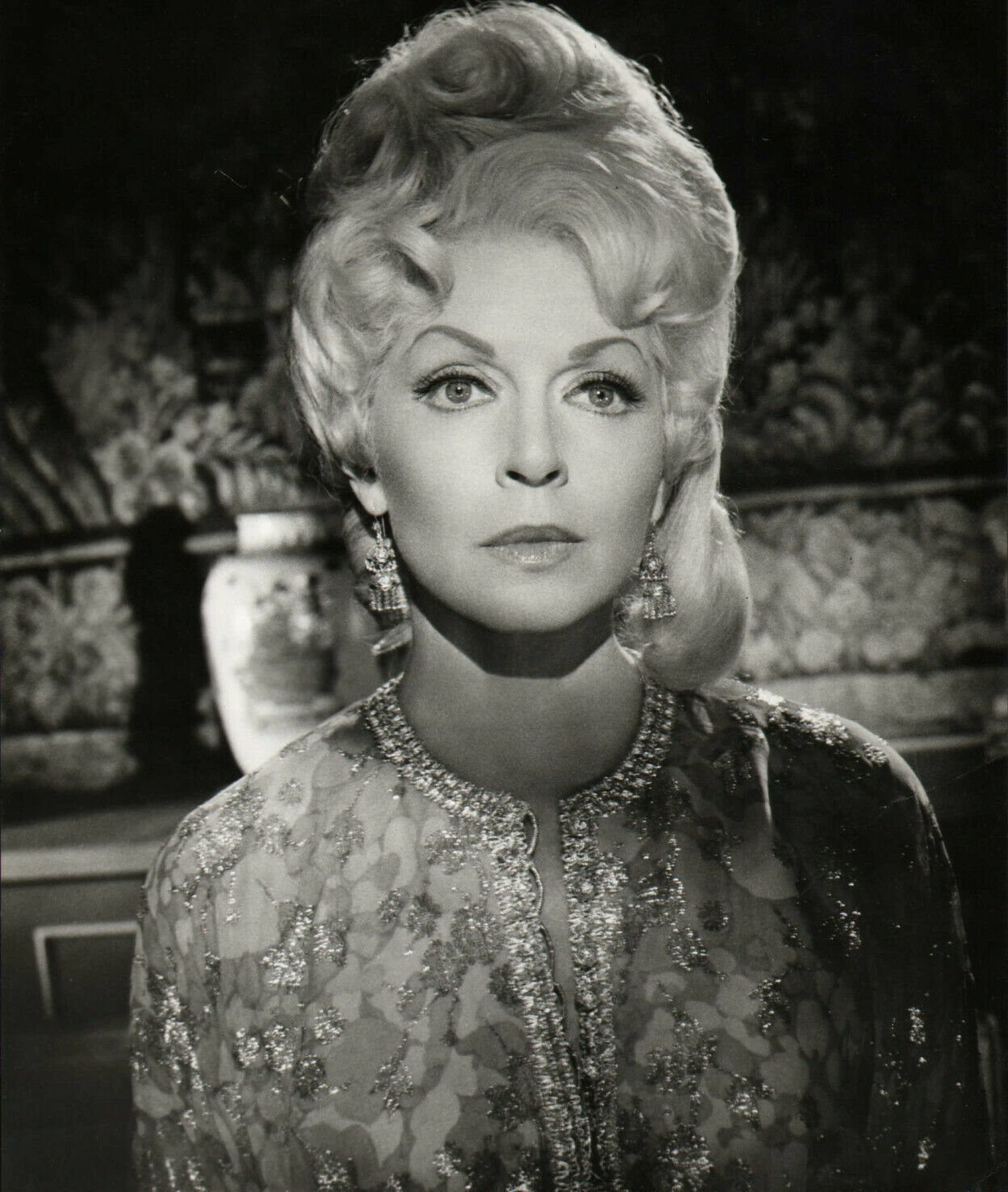
Turner in a publicity still for the film

Lana Turner's casting was announced in the spring of 1968. As part of her contract, Turner refused to appear nude in the film, despite the screenplay originally calling for it.

=== Filming ===
The film was shot on location in Mexico, primarily at the Studios Churbusco in Mexico City as well as on the coastal Acapulco Bay with a budget of US$560,000. The shooting schedule was scheduled to last approximately eight weeks, with principal photography beginning on May 3, 1968. The decision to shoot the film abroad was to dually help bolster Mexico's film market, as well as help lower production costs, which were estimated to be $300,000 more if filmed in the United States. It was George Chakiris' last lead in a feature film.

== Release ==
The Big Cube opened at the Acapulco Film Festival in November 1968 before being released theatrically in the United States on April 30, 1969, opening regionally in Cincinnati, Ohio. It continued to open in several U.S. cities throughout May 1969, including Philadelphia, Pennsylvania; Chicago, Illinois; Portland, Oregon; and Boston, Massachusetts. The film opened in Los Angeles on May 21, 1969, though New York City engagements did not begin until January 1970.

=== Home media ===
The Big Cube was released on DVD in 2007 as part of Volume 2 of Warner Brothers' Cult Camp Classic's "Women in Peril" series, a three-part series that included John Cromwell's Caged (1950) and the film that gave Joan Crawford her last starring role, Freddie Francis' Trog (1970).

== See also ==
- List of American films of 1969
