= Educando a Nina (Mexican TV series) =

- Promotional poster
- Genre: Telenovela
- Based on: Educando a Nina by Sebastián Ortega
- Screenplay by: María Elena López
- Story by: Ernesto Korovsky; Silvina Frejdkes; Alejandro Quesada
- Directed by: Claudio Callao; Raúl Antonio Caballero C.
- Starring: Cynthia Rodríguez; Antonio Gaona; Alex Sirvent; Wendy de los Cobos
- Theme music composer: JJ Mezzara; Azteca Música
- Opening theme: "Escápate conmigo" by Cynthia Rodríguez and David Palacio
- Country of origin: Mexico
- Original language: Spanish
- No. of seasons: 1
- No. of episodes: 106

Production
- Executive producers: Ana Celia Urquidi; Joshua Mintz
- Camera setup: Multi-camera
- Production company: TV Azteca

Original release
- Network: Azteca Uno
- Release: 12 March – 4 August 2018

Educando a Nina is a Mexican telenovela produced by Joshua Mintz that premiered on Azteca Uno on 12 March 2018 and concluded on 4 August 2018. The telenovela it is an adaptation of the Argentina drama of the same name produced by Telefe in 2016. It stars Cynthia Rodríguez as the titular character, alongside Antonio Gaona and Alex Sirvent.

== Plot ==
Two twin sisters are separated at birth and lead opposite lives ignoring the existence of the other. The history of both will change radically when they are forced to live the life of their sister. Thirty years ago, Manuel, owner of a prestigious publishing house, is a married man but has a clandestine history with Luisa, a beautiful dancer. Luisa who becomes pregnant and to not complicate the marriage of Manuel disappears and takes refuge in his brother José. Luisa gives birth to twins and dies in childbirth. José refuses to give the girls to their father because he blames Manuel for the death of his sister. However, he can not keep them both. José notifies Manuel that he is a father, but he only gives him one girl and hides the existence of her twin, whom José appropriates and names her as Nina, his biological daughter. Nina, along with her best friend Susy, are choristers of "Daddy Papi", the king of the reggeton, with whom she has a very passionate love relationship. Together with them the musicians and her father José, live in the pension of Meche, the mother of Daddy Papi. Mara lives with Manuel and his new partner, Andrea, a much younger woman. Mara is in the direction of a female magazine of the publishing house of her father, although she does not work. Who takes charge is Patricio, her best friend and Manuel's right hand.

== Cast ==
- Cynthia Rodríguez as Nina Peralta/Mara dos Puertas
- Antonio Gaona as Luca Aguirre
- Alex Sirvent as Antonio Aguirre
- Wendy de los Cobos as Mercedes "Meche" Lara
- Marco Treviño as Manuel dos Puertas
- Martha Cristiana as Andrea dos Puertas
- Rodolfo Valdés as Patricio Arenas
- Alejandro Ibarra as Salomón
- Darío Ripoll as Van Damme
- Estefanía Hinojosa as Susana "Susy" Contreras
- David Palacio as Lalo "El Daddy Papi"
- Gimena Gómez as Sofía
- Pilar Ixquic Mata as Selva
- Vanessa Terkes as Magaly
- Marina Ruiz as Perla
- Erika Fernández as Graciela
- Jimmy Quijano as Moronas
- Fernanda Tosky as Carmela
- Erika García as Janine
- Juan Felipe Pulido as El Tattoo
- Luis Fernando Peña as Beto
- Mariana Ávila as Milagros (Mili)
- Oswaldo Zárate as Micky
- Pepe Valdivieso as Leo
- Óscar Olivares as Blondy
- Luis Miguel Villoslada as Tiago Martínez del Campo
- Jorge Emilio as Andy
- Arturo Ríos as José Peralta

== Rating ==
Season	Timeslot (CT)	Episodes	First aired		Last aired	
Season	Timeslot (CT)	Episodes	Date	Viewers (millions)	Date	Viewers (millions)
1	Mon–Fri 8:30pm	106	12 March 2018	0.76	4 August 2018	0.35
