= Sueño de amor (2016 TV series) =

- Genre: Telenovela
- Created by: Alejandro Pohlenz; Juan Osorio; Pablo Ferrer
- Starring: Cristián de la Fuente; Betty Monroe; Sabine Moussier; Julián Gil; Renata Notni; Carmen Salinas; Santiago Ramundo; Marjorie de Sousa
- Theme music composer: Jesús Blanco
- Opening theme: "Mi verdad" performed by Maná and Shakira
- Ending theme: "Para estar contigo" performed by Pau y Davo
- Country of origin: Mexico
- Original language: Spanish
- No. of episodes: 131

Production
- Executive producer: Juan Osorio
- Producers: Roy Nelson Rojas Vargas; Ignacio Ortíz Castillo
- Production locations: Mexico City, Mexico; Televisa San Angel; Los Angeles, California; Acapulco, Guerrero
- Editors: Norma Ramírez; Félix Wilfrido
- Camera setup: Multi-camera
- Running time: 42-44 minutes
- Production company: Televisa

Original release
- Network: Canal de las Estrellas
- Release: February 22 – August 21, 2016

Sueño de amor (English: Dream of Love) is a Mexican telenovela produced by Juan Osorio for Televisa. It is also broadcast in Univision in the United States.

The main protagonists are Cristián de la Fuente, Betty Monroe, Marjorie de Sousa, Renata Notni and Santiago Ramundo. While Sabine Moussier, Julián Gil, Beatriz Morayra and Jesús Carús are main antagonists. With the stellar performances are Lola Merino, Osvaldo de León, Polo Morín, Julio Mannino and the leading actress Carmen Salinas.

== Plot ==
Esperanza Guerrero is a single mother working as a teacher at two schools, a state school and an elite school to provide for her two teenagers, Pedro and Patricia. Ricardo Alegría, a married father with two young children, works as an Interpol agent in Los Angeles. Seeking to capture a sleazy jewellery thief known as 'La Sombra', he infiltrates the private school where Esperanza is employed and masquerades as the teacher of the criminal's son. Esperanza and Ricardo are reunited following a 20-year separation and fight to rekindle their love.

== Production ==
This telenovela is an original story. Production on the telenovela began on December 28, 2015, in Mexico City. The telenovela also films at Televisa San Angel. Producer Juan Osorio traveled to South Korea looking for a good story, but came back to Mexico opting for an original one, with South Korean influences.

=== Casting ===
The casting call for the telenovela was held on November 17, 2015, at Televisa San Ángel. The auditions were later broadcast for fans to stream via Televisa's official website. On November 26, 2015, Renata Notni was confirmed for one of the lead youth roles in the telenovela. On December 3, 2015, actor Daniel Bisogno confirmed, via the "Ventaneando" program, that Betty Monroe would be the lead for the melodrama, and Cristian de la Fuente, was announced as the male lead of the story.

== Cast ==
=== Main ===
- Cristian de la Fuente as Ricardo Alegría
- Betty Monroe as Esperanza Guerrero
- Sabine Moussier as Tracy Kidman
- Julián Gil as Ernesto de la Colina
- Renata Notni as Patricia Guerrero
- Carmen Salinas as Margarita Manzanares
- Santiago Ramundo as Luca de la Colina
- Marjorie de Sousa as Cristina Velez

=== Recurring ===
- Lola Merino as Viviana Conde
- Osvaldo de León as Erasmo Gallo
- Emilio Osorio as Kiko Gallo
- Rodrigo Vidal as Félix del Pozo
- Polo Morín as Pedro Carmona Guerrero
- Beatriz Morayra as Silvana Fierro
- Julio Mannino as Mario Kuri
- Jesús Carús as Vicente Santillana
- Kya Shin as Triana Fonseca
- Fernanda Urdapilleta as Salma Kuri
- Paul Stanley as Adán
- Gustavo Munguía as Nacho
- TeSan Kang as Choi Pak
- María Andrea as Kristel Kuri
- Andrés Delgado as Adrián de la Colina
- Dayren Chávez as Estrella Gallo
- Christian Vega as Virgilio
- Isabella Tena as Selena Alegría
- María José Mariscal as Pamela
- Marilyz León as Sandra
- Bea Ranero as Aranza
- Ginny Hoffman as Begoña
- Laura Vignatti as Anastasia Limantour
- Claudia Marían as Bárbara Mayorga
- Kelchie Arizmendi as Felicia
- Mauricio Ramírez as Rodrigo Alegría
- Claudia Martín as Anya

=== Guest stars ===
- El Chapo de Sinaloa as Jerónimo Durán
- Juan José Origel as Gonzalo Santillana
- Gimena Goméz as Eliza Olivier
- David Pasteur as Casildo
- Eric Prats as El Amo
- Marco Méndez as Óscar Sousa

== Broadcast ==
It premiered on Canal de las Estrellas on February 22, 2016, and began airing weeknights on Univision on March 8, 2016, and then was switched to weekday afternoons on July 25, 2016.

== Awards and nominations ==
| Year | Award | Category | Nominated | Result |
|---|---|---|---|---|
| 2017 | 35th TVyNovelas Awards | Best Antagonist Actress | Sabine Moussier | Nominated |
| 2017 | 35th TVyNovelas Awards | Best Antagonist Actor | Julián Gil | Nominated |
| 2017 | 35th TVyNovelas Awards | Best Young Lead Actress | Renata Notni | Won |
| 2017 | 35th TVyNovelas Awards | Best Young Lead Actor | Polo Morín | Won |
| 2017 | 35th TVyNovelas Awards | Best Male Revelation | Santiago Ramundo | Nominated |
| 2017 | 35th TVyNovelas Awards | Best Musical Theme | "Mi verdad" (Maná And Shakira) | Nominated |
