= Cynthia Rodríguez =

Mexican singer and reality television personality (born 1984)

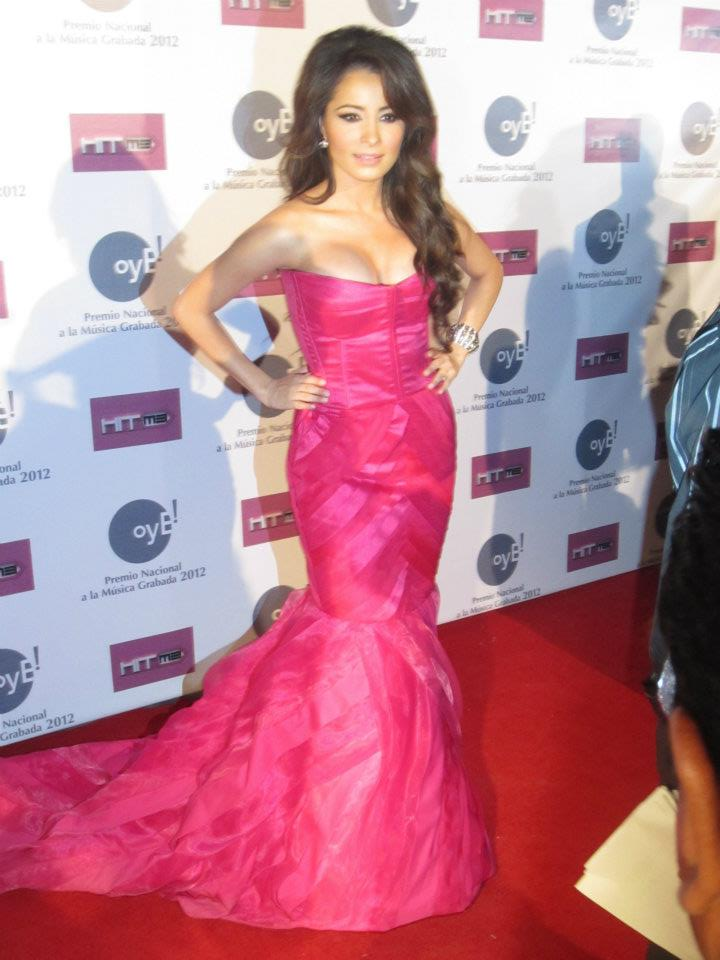
- Born: Cynthia Deyanira Rodríguez Ruiz; May 8, 1984 (age 42); Monclova, Coahuila, Mexico
- Musical career
- Genres: Pop, dance
- Years active: 2005–present
- Label: Warner Music
- Website: Official website

Cynthia Deyanira Rodríguez Ruiz (Spanish pronunciation: [ˈsintja roˈðɾiɣes]; born May 8, 1984, in Monclova, Coahuila, Mexico) is a Mexican singer and reality television personality.

She was a contestant on the reality TV show La Academia, coming in fourth place. Rodríguez later competed on the reality show Desafio de Estrellas. She was voted off the show right before the finals, with only five other contestants left. Her album Soy was released in June 2006, just as she left Desafio de Estrellas. She was selected to sing the theme song for a television series on TV Azteca, called Looking for a Man.

Cynthia later played an important antagonist role in a Mexican "telenovela" called Bellezas Indomables. Concurrently, her second album Provocame was released in March 2008.

In the present, Cynthia is playing the role of the protagonist's best friend in the "telenovela" Mujer Comprada, which airs daily on TV Azteca. At the same time, she is the hostess of a music videos show called Festival Azteca Music, which airs weekly on Azteca America. She is also planning the release of her third album for 2010.

In 2011, after retiring from the Warner Music Mexico label after three years, Cynthia signed a contract with the record label Sony Music, and recorded her third album Tú como yo, where she ventured into regional Mexican music (grupera) with songs written and composed by various singer-songwriters and composers such as Espinoza Paz, Áureo Baqueiro, A.B. Quintanilla, Leonel García (ex Sin Bandera) and Paty Cantú, consolidating her musical career and positioning within the Top 10 on various radio stations in Mexico, and with which she is nicknamed "La princesa grupera". It includes the songs "De ti", "Ven", "Enamorada" and the eponymous song "Tú como yo", which is a duet with rapper and former member of the Mexican group Kumbia All Starz, Ricky Rick; In addition to the theme song for the novela Huérfanas, "Cuando no estás," a concert tour was also held in both the United States and Mexico to promote this album.

That same year, she continued working at TV Azteca, this time as a co-host of the support program Red Ángel, alongside actor and host Omar Fierro.

Years later, in 2013, she participated in the telenovelas Los Rey and Corazón en condominio, starring in the latter alongside Víctor García, with whom she also performed the novela's theme song. In 2014, she appeared as a judge on the impersonation program Soy tu doble (I Am Your Double). Later, producer Eduardo Paz announced her starring role in the musical ¡Qué rico mambo!, making her debut as a theater actress.

In 2015, Cynthia, along with Víctor García and Alex Garza, hosted the entertainment program Viva el Show for TV Azteca.

In 2017, she released her single "Conquistame" (Conquistame), hosted the grupera music program Corazon grupero, and has also appeared in the film "El Hubiera Sí Existe" and the telenovelas "Las Malcriadas" and "Educando a Nina" (Educating Nina). The latter is a Mexican version of the Argentine series of the same name, in which she plays the lead role of twins. She also recorded a duet with actress and singer Mariana Seoane, a cover of the song "Me Equivoqué" (Me Equivoqué).

In 2018, Cynthia returned to the reality show La Academia, this time as a backstage presenter and co-presenter; and months later, she joined the animation of the miscellaneous program Todo un show, replacing the presenter Anette Cuburu, Cynthia shared with the YouTuber, actor and television presenter Roger González, the entertainment journalist Laura G and the remembered Argentine actor and host Fernando del Solar, to later join her colleagues as the main cast of the morning show Venga la alegría after the early end of Todo un show; she remained at VLA for three years.

At the beginning of 2021, in April, Cynthia Rodríguez launched her cosmetics brand, CYN: by Cynthia Rodríguez, where she manages her products.

After more than 15 years in television, in 2022, Cynthia left TV Azteca and the morning show VLA to begin pursuing several personal commitments for a long period away from the media.

Additionally, Cynthia launched her official YouTube channel, CynthiaTV, where she hosts various segments related to beauty, healthy recipes, and fitness. She also does interviews with various artists, challenges, and reminisces about her music videos. Currently, this channel has more than 920,000 subscribers.

== Filmography ==
Television roles
Year	Title	Role	Notes
2007	Se Busca Un Hombre	Fernanda	
2009	Mujer comprada	Susana "Susa"	
2010	Quiéreme tonto	Presa	
2011	Huérfanas	Herself	
2011	A corazón abierto	Deborah	
2012	Los Rey	Tamara	
2013	Corazón en condominio	Tatiana de la Garza	
2016	El Vato	Mía Carrasco	2 episodes
2017	Las Malcriadas	Teresa Villa	
2018	Educando a Nina	Nina Peralta / Mara dos Puertas	

== La Academia performances ==
4th season of La Academia Azteca (2005)

- February 27, 2005 - "Sabes Una Cosa" by Luis Miguel
  - A Duet with Erasmo Catarino
- March 6, 2005 - "Acción Y Reacción" by Thalía
- March 13, 2005 - "Con Los Años Que Me Quedan" by Gloria Estefan
- March 20, 2005 - "Me Equivoqué" by Mariana Seoane
- March 27, 2005 - "Todo Mi Corazón" by Yuri
- April 3, 2005 - "En Carne Viva" by Pandora
- April 10, 2005 - "Oleada" by Julieta Venegas
- April 17, 2005 - "Mi Problema" by Marisela
- April 24, 2005 - "Tengo Todo Excepto A Ti" by Luis Miguel
- May 1, 2005 - "Bandido" by Ana Bárbara
- May 8, 2005 - "Amor Se Paga Con Amor" by Jennifer Lopez
- May 15, 2005 - Ex-Contestants Show
- May 22, 2005 - "Con La Misma Piedra" by Alicia Villarreal
- May 29, 2005 - "Piel Morena" by Thalía
- June 5, 2005 - "A Cada Paso" by Luz Casal
- June 12, 2005
  - Performs "Desesperada" by Marta Sánchez
  - "Odio Amarte" by Ha*Ash. Second song performed was a duet with Silvia
- June 19, 2005
  - "Tú" by Noelia
  - "Quítame Este Hombre" by Pilar Montenegro
- June 26, 2005
  - "Andar Conmigo" by Julieta Venegas
  - "Cosas Del Amor" by Yuri and Ana Bárbara. Duet with Silvia

Grand Final

- July 3, 2005
  - "Desesperada" by Marta Sánchez. The teachers of La Academia chose the song as her best performance
  - "Te Amo" by Guadalupe Pineda
  - She won 4th place. Erasmo Catarino was the 4th season winner, Yuridia was 2nd, Adrian 3rd, Edgar was 5th and Silvia placed 6th.

Desafio de Estrellas 2009

== Discography ==
=== Albums ===
Year	Album	MEX	US
2006	Soy	1	-
2008	Provocame	-	-

=== Singles ===
Year	Song	Album	MEX	US
2005	"Si No Estas Conmigo" (featuring José Luis)	Amor en Custodia (Soundtrack)	1	-
2006	"Soy"	Soy	2	-
2007	"Y Ahora Vienes Tú"	Soy: Special Edition		-
2008	"TBC"	Provocame	1	-
