= Cielo rojo =

Television series

- Red Sky
- Genre: Romance, Black humor, Comedy drama
- Created by: Eric Vonn
- Developed by: Azteca; Azteca Novelas: Alberto Santini Lara; Elisa Salinas
- Directed by: Mauricio Meneses; Pablo Gomez-Saenz; David Robledo; Carlos Angel Guerra
- Starring: Edith González; Mauricio Islas; Regina Torné; Andrea Noli; Aura Cristina Geithner; Alejandra Lazcano
- Theme music composer: Juan Zaizar
- Opening theme: "Cielo Rojo" by Ana Gabriel
- Country of origin: Mexico
- Original language: Spanish
- No. of episodes: 171 (list of episodes)

Production
- Executive producer: Rafael Uriostegui
- Producer: Ximena Cantuarias
- Production locations: Querétaro; Tubutama, Sonora; Mexico City; Paris; Guadalajara
- Editors: Mónica Rodríguez Carrillo; Alejandra Espinoza; Fernando Rodríguez Carrillo
- Camera setup: Multi-camera
- Running time: 41–63 minutes
- Production company: TV Azteca

Original release
- Network: Azteca Trece
- Release: 23 May 2011 – 15 January 2012

Related
- Entre el amor y el deseo; La mujer de Judas

Cielo rojo is a Mexican telenovela produced by Rafael Uriostegui for TV Azteca. Starring Edith González and Mauricio Islas, co-starring by Alejandra Lazcano and Lambda García, and with the antagonistic participations of Regina Torné, Andrea Noli, Ramiro Huerta, Gabriela Vergara, Aura Cristina Geithner, Alberto Casanova, Betty Monroe and Andrea Escalona Filming lasted from 4 April 2011 to 1 December 2011. It premiered on 23 May 2011 on Azteca Trece, occupying Entre el amor y el deseo's slot.

== Plot ==
It tells the passionate story of Alma, a great woman willing to collect from life what she owes. In the past he had a great love, Andrés Renteria, but fate was responsible for separating them. Alma is a young woman who is married to Victor, a man who suffers from diabetes, and who widely obeys his mother, Doña Loreto. Victor coldly beat Alma, who suffered from his mistreatment. Some time later Víctor apologizes to Alma, and tells him that his situation will change. Rebirth of love One day Víctor introduces him to Andrés, but Alma and Andrés have really known each other since their adolescence, and had given themselves, for which their love is reborn. Alma and Andrés keep their love secret for weeks, until they decide to escape and live their love together. Precisely the day that Alma and Andrés decide to escape, in the midst of their jealousy, Víctor has a strong argument with Alma, but Víctor feels bad about his illness, falling and hitting his head. Tragedy Doña Loreto, the only person present, blames Alma to the police, saying that she murdered her son, for which Alma is unjustly put in prison. Meanwhile Doña Loreto and Bernardo, put together a plan and tell Andrés that Alma and Víctor reconciled and traveled to a second honeymoon. Andrés suffering consoles himself in the arms of Lucrecia, who was already supposedly pregnant by Andrés. In prison, Alma gives birth to a girl, Andrés's daughter. Her ex-mother-in-law, even knowing that she is not her granddaughter, finds a way to take it off, and disappears with the little girl. Andrés marries his old girlfriend, who pretends to be pregnant with him, although in reality the child is someone else's. Alma spends twenty years in jail, believing that Andrés ignored her and did not want to help her. Andrés, for his part, is convinced that she decided to stay by her husband's side and forget about him.

Alma leaves prison, full of bitterness, after everything she has had to go through. She is determined to get her daughter back, but she doesn't know where to start. Fate makes her meet Gonzalo, a wealthy old farmer, who always felt a strong attraction to her. Gonzalo is a nice and irreverent man. He's infatuated with her ... but ends up falling in love and offering her marriage. Alma, after many doubts, agrees to marry him. Gonzalo has managed to earn it. At his side she has fun, she feels safe. Andrés has led a gray life, dedicated to his work and what his son believes. Your marriage has been a failure. He could never love his wife, because the memory of Alma has not left him alone. Andrés and Alma meet again, and a whirlwind breaks out around them. They are surrounded by guilt, disappointment, deceit and endless stumbling blocks. Their lives are intertwined again, not only for them, but for their children, who love each other intensely. However, there can be nothing between the two boys, since they are apparently brothers. The lives of Andrés and Alma are in the middle of a labyrinth that seems to have no way out. Passions, ambitions, intrigues, unavoidable commitments, and many deceptions will continue to separate them, while they continue to walk under a "red sky" that is determined not to allow them to unite and be happy.

== Cast ==
- Edith González as Alma Durán
- Mauricio Islas as Andrés Rentería
- Regina Torné as Loreto Encinas
- Andrea Noli as Lucrecia Robledo
- Aura Cristina Geithner as Mariana Robledo
- Andrés Palacios as Nathán Gárces
- Alejandra Lazcano as Daniela Rentería
- Alberto Casanova as Ricardo Molina
- Carmen Beato as Natalia "Nata" Aguilar
- Daniel Martínez as Marcos Ávila
- Héctor Parra as Jesús Galván
- Jorge Luís Vásquez as Alonso Nájera
- Hernán Mendoza as Bernardo Trejo / Román
- Alan Ciangherotti as Carlos "Calo" Aguirre
- Fernando Lozano as Salomón Ramos
- Ramiro Huerta as Víctor Encinas / David Mansetti
- Betty Monroe as Sofía Márquez
- Simone Victoria as Carolina Vidal
- Jorge Galván as Fabián
- Lambda García as Sebastián Rentería
- Andrea Escalona as Patricia "Paty" Molina
- Humberto Búa as Gastón "Choncho" Molina
- Gloria Stalina as Rosa "Rosita" Trejo
- Daniela Gamba as Andrea Vidal
- María José Magan as Verónica Conde
- Patrick Fernández as César Ávila
- Gabriela Vergara as Aleida Ramos
- Martín Soto as Toto
- Luciano Zacharsky as Álvaro Robledo
- Hugo Stiglitz as Gonzalo Molina
- Sergio Klainer as Ángel Durán
- Sandra Itzel as Alma Durán
- Alonso Espeleta as Andrés Rentería
- Jorge Levy as Padre Servando
- Roxana Saucedo as Leticia
- Giovani Florido as Ismael Gomár
- Ramón Medina Orellana as Silverio
