= Arantxa Urretabizkaia =

Spanish Basque contemporary writer and actress

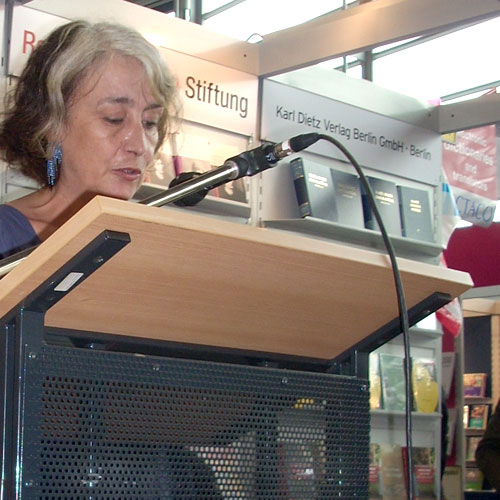
- Born: Arantxa Urretabizkaia Bejarano; 1 July 1947 (age 79); San Sebastián, Gipuzkoa, Spain
- Education: University of Barcelona
- Occupations: Writer, screenwriter and actress
- Writing career
- Language: Basque
- Genre: Novels

Arantxa Urretabizkaia Bejarano (born 1 July 1947) is a Basque writer, screenwriter and actress.

== Biography ==
She was born in San Sebastián, Gipuzkoa, Basque Country. As a student at the University of Barcelona, Urretabizkaia wrote the screenplays of:

1. A los cuatro vientos, (English title: To the Four Winds), 1987
2. Zergatik panpox? (Basque - released as a film in 1985)
3. Albaniaren konkista, (Basque title: Albaniaren konkista), 1984.

In 1981 she also acted in La Fuga de Segovia film (English title: Escape from Segovia).

The Basque theatre company Agerre Teatroa adapted her novel «Zergatik Panpox?» and performed in Madrid the resulting monologue, an interpretation by Maite Agirre of the feminine condition and fin de siècle solitude.

In 1988, the Basque Government's Department of Culture and Tourism created the Premio de Merecimiento de las Letras Vascas and appointed Urretabizkaia a member to represent Basque cultural interests.

Some of her works have also been translated to German.

== Works ==
=== Short stories ===
- Aspaldian espero zaitudalako ez nago sekula bakarrik (1983, Erein)
- Aurten aldatuko da nire bizitza (1992, Erein)

=== Novels ===
- Zergatik panpox? (1979, Hordago) ISBN 84-7099-086-1. Spanish: ¿Por qué Panpox?, Edicions del Mall, ISBN 84-7456-321-6
- Saturno (1987, Erein). Spanish: Alfaguara hispánica, 1999
- Koaderno gorria (1998, Erein)

=== Poetry ===
- Maitasunaren magalean (1982, GAK)
- XX. mendeko poesia kaierak - Arantxa Urretabizkaia (2000, Susa)
