= Arantxa Ochoa =

Dancer (born 1974)

Arantxa Ochoa (born in Valladolid, Spain, 1974) is a Spanish ballet dancer and former principal dancer with the Pennsylvania Ballet.

Her artistic beginnings are rooted in rhythmic gymnastics. When she was twelve, she moved to Madrid and studied ballet at Victor Ullate's Dance Center. Two years later, she moved to Monte Carlo and continued her studies at the Académie de Danse Princesse Grace. At the age of seventeen, Ochoa was accepted at the School of American Ballet and she completed her training in New York City.

Ochoa danced with Hartford Ballet for three years before joining the corps of Pennsylvania Ballet in 1996. Her grace and talent quickly moved her through the ranks. She was promoted to soloist in 1999 and to principal in 2001. Since then, Arantxa has performed many principal roles including Aurora in Sleeping Beauty, Juliet in Romeo and Juliet, and the double-role Odette/Odille in Swan Lake.

Ochoa has had the opportunity to perform in galas and benefits, including Muses for the Cure, of which she is a co-founder. She is an active teacher, leading master classes in Boston, Philadelphia, and Hartford. She is married to former Pennsylvania Ballet principal dancer, Alexander Iziliaev.

She currently works at Miami City Ballet School, serving as School Artistic Director.
