= Rosalía Valdés =

Mexican singer and actress (born 1958)

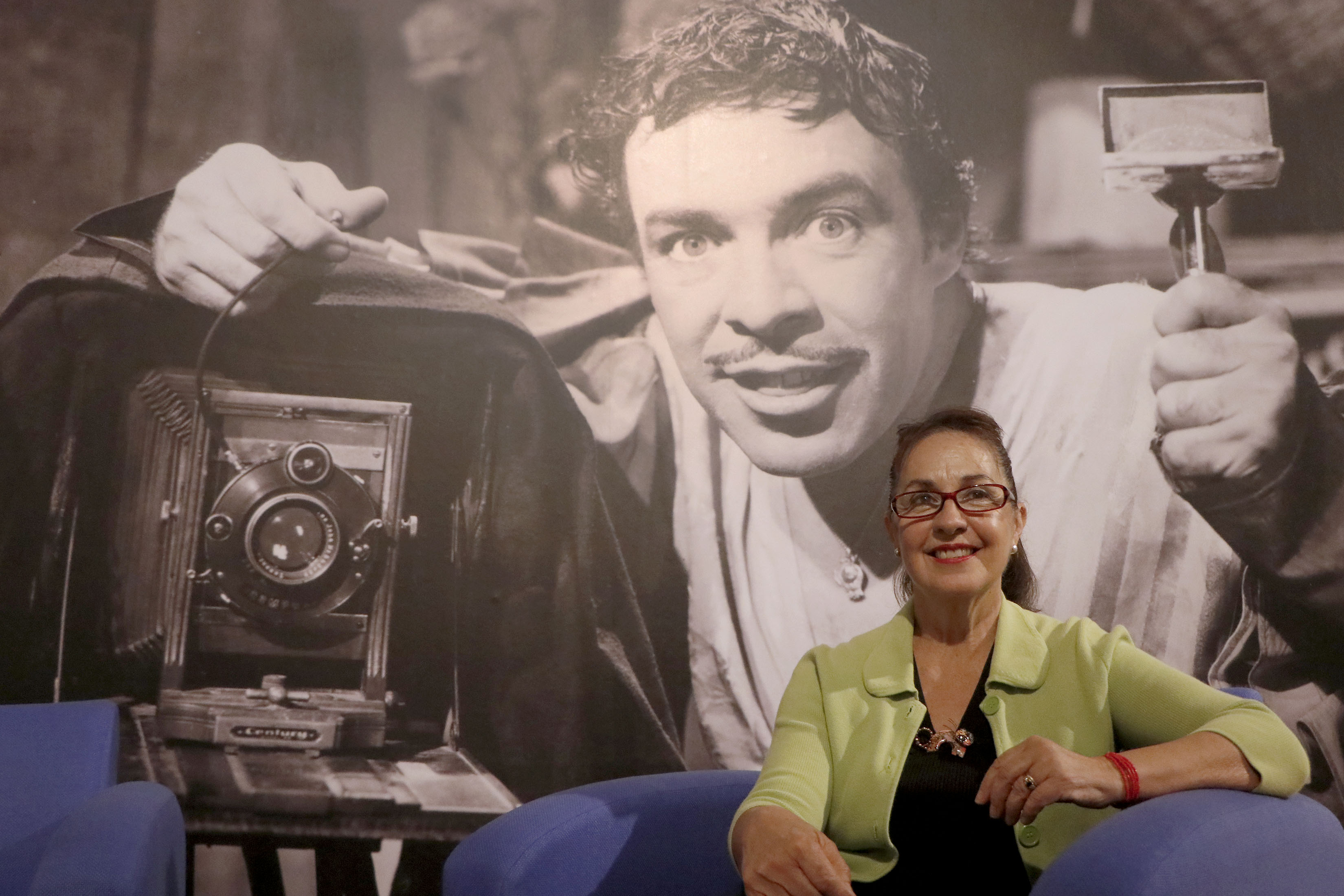
- Rosalía Valdés in 2021.
- Born: 1958
- Occupation: Singer, film actor
- Parent(s): Germán Valdés
- Awards: El Heraldo de México Awards (1979)

Rosalía Valdés Julián (born 1958) is a Mexican former singer and actress. She is the daughter of Mexican comedian Germán Valdés and former singer Rosalía Julián. Her performance in the movie El Vuelo de la cigüeña (1979) earned her a Heraldo prize. She is now retired from the entertainment industry.

== Information ==
During the 1970s and 1980s, Valdés recorded several albums and starred in Mexican movies, telenovelas and television shows. Her most notable songs are "Tu regreso", "Si llegara el amor", "Volverás A Sonreir" and "Está escrito, lo veré". The latter song was about how she dealt with her father's death.

Valdés wrote and published her first book, La historia inédita de Tin Tán, a biography of her father, in 2003.
