= Mauricio Islas =

Mexican actor

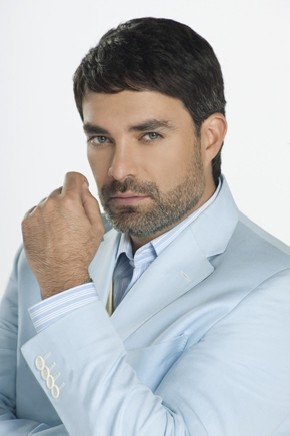
- Islas in 2012
- Born: Juan Mauricio Islas Ilescas; August 16, 1973 (age 52); Mexico City, Distrito Federal, Mexico
- Occupation: Actor
- Years active: 1992–present
- Spouse: Patricia Villasaña (m. 2001; div. 2006)
- Partner: Paloma Quezada (2007–present)
- Children: 3
- Website: mauricioislasonline.com

Mauricio Islas (born Juan Mauricio Islas Ilescas, August 16, 1973) is a Mexican actor. He is best known for his work in telenovelas produced by Televisa, TV Azteca, Telemundo, and Venevision.

== Early life ==
Born in Mexico City, Mexico, Islas is the son of businessman, Juan Islas, and Rosalinda Ilescas, and the youngest of two brothers.

== Career ==
After working in various telenovelas, Islas had his first starring role with Preciosa, alongside Irán Castillo in 1998.

From then on he continued working mainly as a leading actor, but occasionally playing antagonic roles, as in his 2000 participation in Primer amor... a mil por hora where he interpreted the malicious Demián and in 2006 Amores de Mercado, starring as Fernando Leyra.

In 2001, he starred in El manantial, alongside Adela Noriega. He won a TVyNovelas Award for his performance. In 2003, he starred in the acclaimed historical telenovela, Amor real, interpreting the army soldier Adolfo Solis.

In 2004, he signed a contract with Telemundo and starred in Prisionera, Amores de Mercado, Pecados Ajenos and other successful productions from the network.

He returned to Mexico in 2010 and starred in the TV Azteca telenovelas, La Loba and Cielo Rojo.

=== Personal life ===
On November 29, 2001, he married Venezuelan singer, Patricia Villasaña. They had a daughter, Camila, born on May 3, 2002. They divorced in 2006.

He later had a son, Emiliano, with his current partner Paloma Quezada. The baby was born on February 24, 2011, in El Paso, Texas.

== Filmography ==
=== Film ===
Year	Title	Role	Notes
2002	Punto y aparte	Sergio	
2005	Don de Dios	José Luis	
2006	Ambiciona	Raúl	
2009	El cártel	Santos	
2010	El secreto	Maurice de Gavrillac	
2010	Un Tigre	Tigre	Short film
2011	Viento en contra	Matías Parga	
2015	Entrenando a mi papá	La Araña Salazar	

=== Television ===
Year	Title	Role	Notes
1992	Mágica juventud	Alfredo	
1992	Carrusel de las Américas		
1994–1995	Volver a empezar	Freddy Landeros	
1995–1996	Pobre niña rica	David	
1996	Canción de amor	Édgar	
1996–1997	Mi querida Isabel	Marcos	
1997–1998	Mi pequeña traviesa	Juan Felipe	
1998	Preciosa	Luis Fernando Santander	Nominated - TVyNovelas Award for Best Young Lead Actor
1999	Cuento de Navidad	Edmundo Soto / Toño	4 episodes
1999	Amor gitano	Renzo	6 episodes
2000	DKDA: Sueños de juventud	Mauricio	2 episodes
2000	Mi Destino Eres Tú	Ramiro Galindo Suárez	
2000–2001	Primer amor, a mil por hora	Demián Ventura Camargo	Nominated - TVyNovelas Award for Best Male Antagonist; Eres Award for Best Antagonist
2001–2002	El Manantial	Alejandro Ramírez Insunza	TVyNovelas Award for Best Lead Actor; El Heraldo Award for Best Television Actor; Bravo Award for Best Lead Actor
2001	Primer amor, tres años después	Demián Ventura Camargo	Television film
2003	Amor real	Colonel Adolfo Solís	Sol de Oro for Best Antagonist; Califa de Oro for Best Antagonist; Nominated - TVyNovelas Award for Best Male Antagonist
2004	Prisionera	Daniel Moncada #1	
2005	Los plateados	Gabriel Campuzano	
2006–2007	Amores de mercado	Fernando Leira / Antonio Álamo	
2007	Decisiones	Fabricio Salas	Episode: "Un amor para toda la vida"
2007–2008	Pecados ajenos	Adrián Torres	Award Fama for Best Actor
2009–2010	Hasta que el dinero nos separe	Edgardo Regino "El Coyote de las ventas"	
2010	La Loba	Emiliano Alcázar	
2011–2012	Cielo rojo	Andrés Renteria	
2012	La mujer de Judas	Simón Castellanos	
2013	Destino	Sebastián Montesinos	
2014–2015	Las Bravo	Leonardo Barbosa / Salvador Martínez	
2016–2017	Perseguidos	José Vicente Solís "El Capo"	
2018–2019	Señora Acero	Héctor Ruiz	
2023	Dra. Lucía, un don extraordinario	Carlos Reséndiz	
2024	La mujer de mi vida	Emilio García Fuentes	
