= Vecinos (Colombian TV series) =

2008 television series

- Genre: Telenovela / comedy
- Written by: Carlos Fernández de Soto, Ana Fernanda Martínez, Andrea López Jaramillo, José Fernando Pérez
- Starring: Robinson Díaz; Flora Martínez
- Opening theme: Soy el que baila
- Country of origin: Colombia
- Original language: Spanish
- No. of episodes: 209

Production
- Production location: Bogotá
- Production company: Caracol Televisión

Original release
- Network: Caracol
- Release: September 1, 2008 – October 13, 2009

Vecinos (English title: Neighbors) is a 2008 Colombian produced telenovela and broadcast by Caracol Televisión. Vecinos made its debut on September 1, 2008. The telenovela has finished its run on Telefutura on May 3, 2010, in the United States. Re-broadcasts of the show were being shown on U.S. broadcaster Unimas (which was previously called Telefutura). It is commonly shown in Spanish classes to help the students learn better Spanish.

== Synopsis ==
In this Colombian telenovela, a humble man named Oscar (Robinson Díaz) is deeply in love with his neighbor Tatiana (Flora Martínez), despite the fact that they are of different social classes. This gives the name of the novela (Vecinos-Neighbors). During the novela, however, an ambitious woman named Jessica (Sara Corrales) is trying to marry Oscar because of his money when he won the lottery. She acts nice to him, since she is Oscar's girlfriend, but would not be so nice if Oscar didn't have money. Oscar finds people who don't like him during the way, like Jessica's boss and lover Rodolfo (Luis Mesa) and many of his neighbors. His mother (Maria Margarita Giraldo) and friends, however, help him along the way nonetheless. In the end, all the barriers are cleared, and Oscar and Tatiana live happily ever after.

== Cast ==
- Robinson Díaz as Óscar Leal
- Flora Martínez as Tatiana Gómez
- Luis Mesa as Rodolfo
- Sara Corrales as Jessica
- Maria Margarita Giraldo as Ruca
- Fernando Solorzano as Henry
- Kenny Delgado as Álvaro
- Adriana Campos as Nicole
- Patricia Polanco as Clara
- Christian Tappan as Alfonso
- Alexandra Restrepo as Patricia
- Alberto Saavedra as Gervasio
- Isabella Córdoba as Tata
- Juan Carlos Arango as Rey Mauricio
- Alberto Barrero as Ubaldo
- Javier Gardeazábal as Alvarito
- Pedro Palacio as Fercho
- Diana Mendoza as Ligia
- María Cristina Montoya as Blanca
- Gabriel Vanegas as Pedro
- Alberto León Jaramillo as Frank Pacheco
- Diana Wiswell as Lina
- Amparo Conde as Alicia
- Andrés Felipe Torrez as Eduardo Pérez
- Fernando Arango as Alberto Buendía
- Víctor Hugo Trespalacios as El Cuervo
- Carlos Kajú as Carlos Alfredo
- Yesenia Valencia as Marisol Gómez

== Ratings ==
On its first episode Vecinos brought a 15.2% rating (49.7 share), which made it the most watched premiere of 2008. On March 26, 2009, Vecinos got a 16.3% rating (50.1 share) making it the most-watched TV Show of the year so far.
