= Arantza Ezenarro =

Spanish soprano (born 1980)

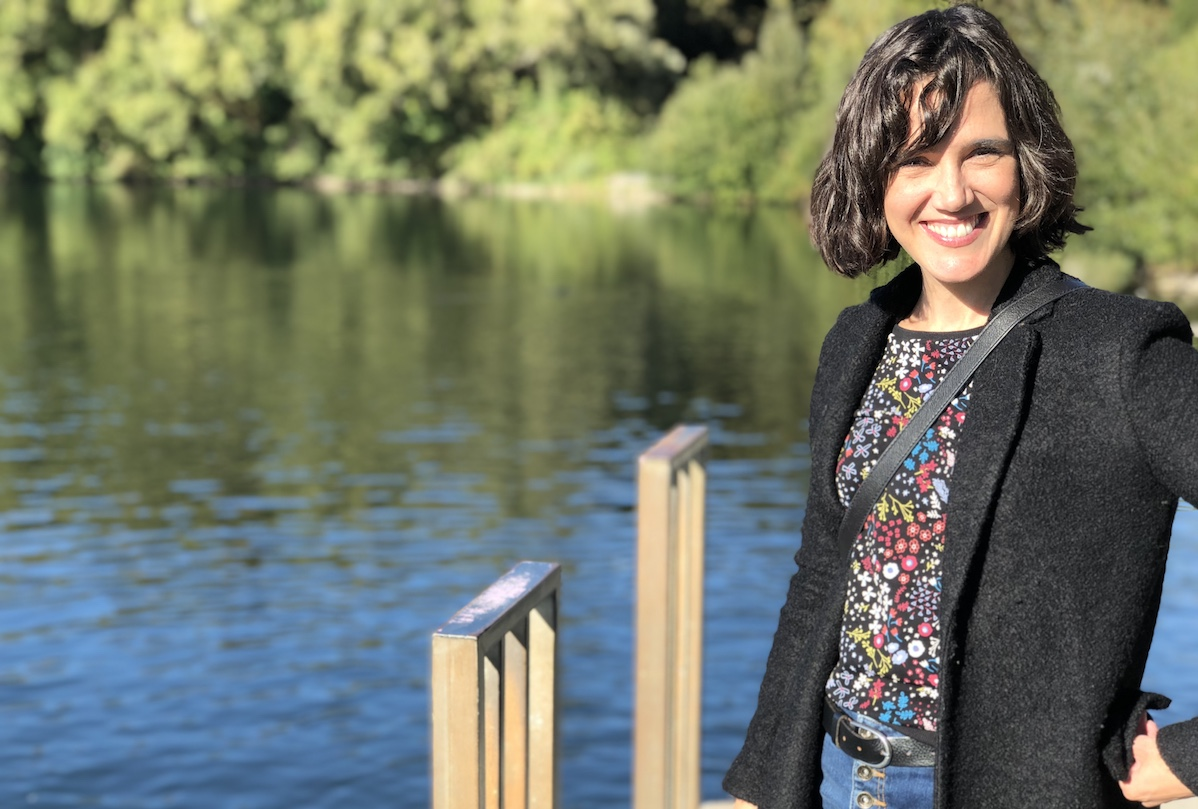
- Ezenarro in 2018
- Born: 1980 (age 45–46); San Sebastián, Spain
- Education: Reina Sofía School of Music; University of Music and Theatre Munich
- Occupation: Opera singer (soprano)
- Years active: 2002–present

Arantza Ezenarro (born 1980) is a Spanish soprano.

== Biography ==
Ezenarro was born in San Sebastián. She began her studies at the Musikabi music school in her hometown. She later studied opera at the Reina Sofía School of Music in Madrid, from which she graduated with honors. She made her opera debut in 2002, singing Countess Ceprano in Giuseppe Verdi's Rigoletto at the Kursaal Congress Centre and Auditorium.

In 2006, she moved to Germany to complete a master's degree in opera and concert singing at the University of Music and Theatre Munich. She later joined the Opernstudio ensemble of the Prinzregententheater and spent two seasons at Theater Ulm. In 2011, she made her debut at the Semperoper in Dresden, singing Adele in Johann Strauss II's Die Fledermaus.

=== Personal life ===
As of 2018, Ezenarro lives in Hildesheim, Lower Saxony, with her husband and son.
