= Víctor García (Mexican singer) =

Mexican singer and actor (born 1975)

Victor García
- Born: Víctor Alejandro García Pérez; October 1, 1975 (age 50); Cd. Madero, Tamaulipas
- Origin: Ciudad Madero, Tamaulipas
- Occupations: Singer, actor
- Years active: 2002–present

Víctor Alejandro García Pérez (born October 1, 1975 in Cd. Madero, Tamaulipas, Tamaulipas) is a Mexican singer and actor.

== Childhood ==
His parents are Victor Garcia, a sailor, and Juana Pérez Sustaita.

== Singing career ==
In 1996, he became the singer of the newly created Grupo Nahum and participated in the Festival Valores Juveniles Bacardi contest winning the second prize in the "Best Musical Group" category. They recorded several albums with producers such as Carlos Lara, Gerardo Flores and Aníbal Pastor.

In 2002, he participated in the casting for the new reality show of TV Azteca, La Academia. He was accepted and on June 30 of the same year he joined the 14-member group. He started in the sixth place but was voted off in the seventh concert. He maintained a good attitude after leaving the academy and was invited back in the "alumni concert" and was asked to stay. On November 10 he became one of the five finalists of the competition. On December 1 he obtained the second place in the finals. His prize was 1.5 million pesos (approximately 140,000 US dollars) in cash, a brand new car, a contract with the Coca-Cola music tour and a contract for five records with Sony Music.

== Acting career ==
In March 2003, he sang the title song for the telenovela Un nuevo amor ("A new love") with the La Academia alumnus Miguel Ángel.

He later joined the cast of the telenovela Enamórate ("Fall in love with me"). In May 2005 he released his first album titled Víctor García which debuted at number one. A month later, he starred in the telenovela 2 chicos de cuidado en la ciudad ("2 guys to be careful with in the city") where he also sang the title song. In August he received a platinum album for the sale of more than 175,000 records in Mexico.

The next month he made a presentation at the Reliant Center of Houston, Texas. In 2004 he became the most-played Latin artist on radio in the United States in the Mexican Regional Music category and was nominated for the Lo Nuestro Billboard award in the same category. In August of the same year he formed part of the cast of the sitcom Los Sánchez and was later nominated for the Oye! Awards in the "Song of the year" for Otra vez ("Again"), "Best new artist" and "Grupero singer or group".

In October 2005, he received a Gold album for the sale of more than 50,000 records of Loco por tí in just 2 weeks after its release. He currently plays Brayan Ferreira in the TV Azteca Novela Pobre Rico Pobre.

== Further information ==
- In 2007, he appeared on an episode of the Mexican Version of the BBC show The Weakest Link, In which he was the 3rd one voted off.

== Albums ==
- Cuando Amar Duele (2009, gold)
- Arráncame (2006)
- Loco por ti (2005, gold)
- Por un Sueño (2004, #1 nationwide)
- Víctor García (2003, platinum)
