= No Fear of Truth: Time to Rise Again =

2020 Mexican television season

- Season 3
- No. of episodes: 35

Release
- Original network: Las Estrellas
- Original release: 9 March – 24 April 2020

Season chronology
- ← Previous; Wake Up

The third season of the Mexican anthology drama television series Sin miedo a la verdad was ordered by Las Estrellas on 9 July 2019, and it premiered simultaneously in Mexico on Las Estrellas and in the United States on Univision on 9 March 2020, and ended on 24 April 2020.

== Cast ==
- Álex Perea as Manuel "Manu / Gus" Montero
- Fermín Martínez as Procurator Horacio Escamilla
- Dacia González as Catalina Gómez Juárez "Doña Cata"
- Anna Ciocchetti as General Brigadier Mora
- Jackie Sauza as Agent Andrea Loera
- Ligia Uriarte as Leticia Murillo "Lety" / Mariana Urquiza "Marián"
- Tania Niebla as Berenice Hidalgo "Bere"
- Jorge Navarro Sánchez as Ángel Armando Soto
- Iván Bronstein as General Ignacio Abascal
- Luis Gerardo Rivera as Adrián
- Santiago Rodríguez Rojas as Joaquín
- Gabriel Ronquillo as Edgar
- Ricardo Franco as Lieutenant Nico
- Gaby Mezone as Gaby
- Paco de la Fuente as Francisco "Paco" Zavala
- Ximena Falcón as Vanessa Lozada
- Eduardo Yáñez as President Emiliano Lozada

== Production ==
On 16 January 2020, two actors, Jorge Navarro Sánchez and Luis Gerardo Rivera, died after falling from a bridge during filming near Mexico City.

== Episodes ==
No. overall	No. in season	Title	Original release date	Mexico viewers (millions)
47	1	"El atentado"	9 March 2020 (Note: Premiered early online through Las Estrellas website and YouTube channel on 6 March 2020.)	3.2
The President is kidnapped after the attack. Manu is interrogated by the Brigadier and Horacio is appointed as the attorney. Cast : Chao as Alfredo Corona, León Michel as Orlando Villegas, Benjamín Martínez as El Alcalde, Perla Corona as Michelle Machallado, Igor Testamarck as Erick Morales "El aniquilador", Lizy Martínez as Lucy, Pietro Vannucci as Marcos, Manuel Bonilla as Secretario de gobernación, Ana Cristina Rubio as Estefani Montero "El Chaka", Paulina de Alba as Maru.
48	2	"La cacería"	10 March 2020	3.0
Horacio orders Manu to be killed with The Annihilator and blames him for the president's disappearance. Bere asks Manu to escape together as a family to the beach. Cast : Emmanuel Morales as Secretario de presidencia, Igor Testamarck as Erick Morales "El aniquilador", Perla Corona as Michelle Machallado, Alma Rosa Añorvez as Dra. Militar, Lizy Martínez as Lucy, Pietro Vannucci as Marcos, Anahí Albores as Roberta, Salvador Amaya as Pedro "Pepe" Cuevas.
49	3	"La traición"	11 March 2020	2.8
La mafia del poder deceives the president and he does not arrive at the Vanesa operation. The brigadier confronts Andrea about her feelings towards Manu. Cast : Benjamín Martínez as El alcalde Aristegui, Perla Corona as Michelle Machallado, León Michel as Orlando Villegas, Rubén Cerda as Genaro Vargas, Mary Juapar as Enfermera, Igor Testamarck as Erick Morales "El aniquilador", Lizy Martínez as Lucy, Pietro Vannucci as Marcos, Manuel Bonilla as Secretario de gobernación, Ana Cristina Rubio as Estefani Montero "El Chaka", Moisés Peñaloza as Recepcionista del Hotel, Lorenzo Castro as Comandante, Ángel Villagrán as manager of the Casa de la Moñeda, Jerry Tena as Samuel Cortés, Luis Loria as Collegiate President.
50	4	"Huyendo de la verdad"	12 March 2020	3.3
The mafia of power deceives the president and he does not arrive at the Vanesa operation. The brigadier confronts Andrea about her feelings towards Manu. Bere is still jealous. Cast : Benjamín Martínez as El alcalde Aristegui, Perla Corona as Michelle Machallado, León Michel as Orlando Villegas, Rubén Cerda as Genaro Vargas, Mary Juapar as Enfermera, Igor Testamarck as Erick Morales "El aniquilador", Lizy Martínez as Lucy, Pietro Vannucci as Marcos, Manuel Bonilla as Secretario de gobernación / Señor K, Ana Cristina Rubio as Estefani Montero "El Chaka", Moisés Peñaloza as Recepcionista del Hotel, Lorenzo Castro as Comandante, Ángel Villagrán as manager of the Casa de la Moñeda, Jerry Tena as Samuel Cortés, Luis Loria as Collegiate President.
51	5	"Temores"	13 March 2020	2.9
Manu and his family arrive at the beach. Lety wants to give up the mafia of power and Horacio orders Andrea Loera to be killed. Cast : Lizy Martínez as Lucy, Emmanuel Morales as Secretario de presidencia, Anahí Albores as Roberta, Pietro Vannucci as Marcos, Leonardo Acosta as Ivan, Benjamín Martínez as El alcalde Aristegui, Ximena Duggan as Paloma, Julián Segura as Bosco, David Chavira as Haragán Boss, Ana Cristina Rubio as Estefani Montero "El Chaka", Pauilina de Alba as Maru, Haret Gaspar as Lorena, Ricardo Zertuche as David.
52	6	"La playa"	16 March 2020	2.5
Abascal stops Escamilla for his mess of skirts. Joaquín runs away from the house. Andrea travels to Oaxaca to find Manu.
53	7	"La confrontación"	17 March 2020	2.8
Andrea asks Manu to return to save the President. Horacio plans a multi-million dollar scam nationwide. Cast : Benjamín Martínez as El alcalde Aristegui, David Chavira as Haragán Boss, Lizy Martínez as Lucy, Ximena Duggan as Paloma, Julián Segura as Bosco, Manuel Bonilla as Secretario de gobernación / Señor K, Ana Cristina Rubio as Estefani Montero "El Chaka", Catalina López as Amanda, Pietro Vannucci as Marcos, Paulina de Alba as Maru, Ricardo Zertuche as David, Hared Gaspar as Lorena.
54	8	"El rescate (parte 1)"	18 March 2020	3.1
Andrea and Manu find an important ally in the city. The operation to save the President has begun.
55	9	"El rescate (parte 2)"	19 March 2020	3.3
Manu and Area 16 release the President from kidnapping. Lety prepares a surprise for Horacio. Manu and Andrea make love. Cast : Chao as Alfredo Corona, Perla Corona as Michelle Machallado, León Michel as Orlando Villegas, Benjamín Martínez as El alcalde Aristegui, Igor Testamarck as Erick Morales "El aniquilador", Pietro Vannucci as Marcos, Emmanuel Morales as Secretario de presidencia, Anahí Albores as Roberta, Martín Rojas as Fercho, Yamil Yáber as Rodrigo.
56	10	"La desaparición (parte 1)"	20 March 2020	3.2
The President calls for zero tolerance for organized crime. Manu decides to revive ‘Gus’. Camila is kidnapped at her birthday party. Cast : Chao as Alfredo Corona, Moisés Arizmendi as Rodolfo, Alejandro Ibarra as Papá Payaso, Deborah Ríos as Mamá Payasa, Yafte Arias as Josué, Jimena Cornejo as Tania, Martín Rojas as Fercho, Adriana Cadeña as Marisol, Tania Nicole as Camila, Benjamín Martínez as El alcalde Aristegui, León Michel as Orlando Villegas, Gerardo Lizalde as Chucho, Rocío Vázquez as Dora, Armando Coria as the Agent Rafael, Manoly Díaz as Diego, Manuel Bonilla as Secretario de gobernación / Señor K.
57	11	"La desaparición (parte 2)"	23 March 2020	3.1
Manu helps Rodolfo save Camila. Horacio plans to be the new boss of the power mafia and Abascal organizes his escape from prison. Cast : Chao as Alfredo Corona, Moisés Arizmendi as Rodolfo, Alejandro Ibarra as Papá Payaso, Deborah Ríos as Mamá Payasa, Yafte Arias as Josué, Jimena Cornejo as Tania, Martín Rojas as Fercho, Adriana Cadeña as Marisol, Tania Nicole as Camila, Benjamín Martínez as El alcalde Aristegui, León Michel as Orlando Villegas, Gerardo Lizalde as Chucho, Rocío Vázquez as Dora, Armando Coria as the Agent Rafael, Manoly Díaz as Diego, Manuel Bonilla as Secretario de gobernación / Señor K, Tomás Goros as Juan.
58	12	"Obediencia (parte 1)"	24 March 2020	3.3
Manu can't stop thinking about Andrea. Escamilla fails to deliver the gold and Abascal escapes from prison. Cast : Daniela Torres as Silvia "La boxeadora", Fernando Robles as the coach Armando, Celia Marcué as Doña Josefina, Melanie León as Julia, Luis Gerardo León as Manjarraez, Pietro Vannucci as Marcos, Manuel Bonilla as Secretario de gobernación "Señor K", Igor Testamarck as Erick Morales "El aniquilador", Manoly Díaz as Diego "K Jr.", Martín Rojas as Fercho, Vladimir Bruciaga as Pancho, Said Sandoval as Pérez, Michelle Rogel as La patrona, Diego Sotelo as Custodio.
59	13	"Obediencia (parte 2)"	25 March 2020	3.1
Manjarraez orders Silvia to let herself win in the fight. A convoy attacks Area 16. Manu talks to Bere about his feelings and Horacio meets Andrea. Cast : Daniela Torres as Silvia "La boxeadora", Fernando Robles as the coach Armando, Celia Marcué as Doña Josefina, Melanie León as Julia, Luis Gerardo León as Manjarraez, Pietro Vannucci as Marcos, Manuel Bonilla as Secretario de gobernación "Señor K", Igor Testamarck as Erick Morales "El aniquilador", Manoly Díaz as Diego "K Jr.", Martín Rojas as Fercho, Vladimir Bruciaga as Pancho, Said Sandoval as Pérez, Michelle Rogel as La patrona, Diego Sotelo as Custodio, Tomás Goros as Juan.
60	14	"Obediencia (parte 3)"	26 March 2020	3.1
Manu tries to rescue Silvia. Andrea, in addition to joining Los Vigías, reunites with Soto and they face off. Cast : Daniela Torres as Silvia "La boxeadora", Fernando Robles as the coach Armando, Celia Marcué as Doña Josefina, Melanie León as Julia, Luis Gerardo León as Manjarraez, Pietro Vannucci as Marcos, Manuel Bonilla as Secretario de gobernación "Señor K", Igor Testamarck as Erick Morales "El aniquilador", Manoly Díaz as Diego "K Jr.", Martín Rojas as Fercho, Vladimir Bruciaga as Pancho, Said Sandoval as Pérez, Michelle Rogel as La patrona, Diego Sotelo as Custodio, Tomás Goros as Juan, Perla Corona as Michelle Machallado, Lizy Martínez as Lucy, Emmanuel Morales as the President's Secretary.
61	15	"El pispireto (parte 1)"	27 March 2020	3.1
Horacio and Abascal start a new era of the power mafia. Manu discovers Andrea's past. Santiago rapes and kidnaps Montserrat. Cast : Tomás Goros as Juan, Hugo Aceves as Santiago "El pispireto", Valeria Leyva as Montserrat, Salvador Sánchez as Don Jaime, Gaby Mellado as Rosalía, Benjamín Martínez as Mayor Aristegui, León Michel as Orlando Villegas, Perla Corona as Michelle Machallado, Vladimir Bruciaga as Pancho, Said Sandoval as Pérez, Emmanuel Morales as the President's Secretary, Adriana Deangelis as Mrs. Villegas.
62	16	"El pispireto (parte 2)"	30 March 2020	3.0
While Manu investigates Santiago, Montserrat suffers from hypothermia in the cistern. Doña Caya and Juan have a romantic date. Cast : Tomás Goros as Juan, Hugo Aceves as Santiago "El pispireto", Valeria Leyva as Montserrat, Salvador Sánchez as Don Jaime, Gaby Mellado as Rosalía, Benjamín Martínez as Mayor Aristegui, León Michel as Orlando Villegas, Perla Corona as Michelle Machallado, Vladimir Bruciaga as Pancho, Said Sandoval as Pérez, Emmanuel Morales as the President's Secretary, Adriana Deangelis as Mrs. Villegas, Martín Rojas as Fercho, Lizy Martínez as Lucy, Emmanuel Morales as the President's Secretary, Karyme Hernández as Eva, Yoanidka Mariel as School Director, Alisson Santiago as Montserrat (child).
63	17	"El pispireto (parte 3)"	31 March 2020	3.1
Manu faces Santiago to rescue Montserrat. Villegas informs the mafia of power about Los Vigías and Raúl is a witness to a crime. Cast : Tomás Goros as Juan, Hugo Aceves as Santiago "El pispireto", Valeria Leyva as Montserrat, Salvador Sánchez as Don Jaime, Gaby Mellado as Rosalía, Benjamín Martínez as Mayor Aristegui, León Michel as Orlando Villegas, Perla Corona as Michelle Machallado, Vladimir Bruciaga as Pancho, Said Sandoval as Pérez, Emmanuel Morales as the President's Secretary, Adriana Deangelis as Mrs. Villegas, Martín Rojas as Fercho, Lizy Martínez as Lucy, Emmanuel Morales as the President's Secretary, Karyme Hernández as Eva, Yoanidka Mariel as School Director, Alisson Santiago as Montserrat (child), Pascacio López as Raúl, Jessica Segura as María, Litzy Ruíz as Lulú, Pietro Vannucci as Marcos, Víctor Hugo Arana as Joel, Said Sandoval as Pérez.
64	18	"Dinero fácil (parte 1)"	1 April 2020	3.1
Maria will get in trouble for stealing money from the locker. Manu and Abdrea meet again, but La Brigadier betrays them by sending her their location. Cast : Pascacio López as Raúl, Jessica Segura as María, Litzy Ruíz as Lulú, León Michel as Orlando Villegas, Perla Corona as Michelle Machallado, Pietro Vannucci as Marcos, Said Sandoval as Pérez, Víctor Hugo Arana as Joel.
65	19	"Dinero fácil (parte 1)"	2 April 2020	3.4
Abascal sets a trap for the president, but Los Vigías catches him. María and Lulú are kidnapped and Manu and Andrea try to reconsider the president. Cast : Pascacio López as Raúl, Jessica Segura as María, Litzy Ruíz as Lulú, León Michel as Orlando Villegas, Perla Corona as Michelle Machallado, Pietro Vannucci as Marcos, Said Sandoval as Pérez, Víctor Hugo Arana as Joel.
66	20	"Dinero fácil (parte 3)"	3 April 2020	3.4
Manu decides to help Raúl rescue his family. Soto and Escamilla find Manu and Andrea. Bere investigates Juan. Cast : Pascacio López as Raúl, Jessica Segura as María, Litzy Ruíz as Lulú, León Michel as Orlando Villegas, Perla Corona as Michelle Machallado, Pietro Vannucci as Marcos, Said Sandoval as Pérez, Víctor Hugo Arana as Joel, Orlando Arroyo as Micky, Emmanuel Morales as the President's Secretary, Leonardo Costa as Iván, Tania Lizardo as Gina, Silvana Garriga as Jessica, Sergio Castillo as Daniel.
67	21	"Mulas de armas (parte 1)"	6 April 2020	2.9
Escamilla escapes from prison and kidnaps Bere. On their road trip, Gina and Jessica will face the police and criminals. Cast : Tomás Goros as Juan, Perla Corona as Michelle Machallado, León Michel as Orlando Villegas, Tania Lizardo as Gina, Silvana Garriga as Jessica, Olivia Bucio as Mariela, Emmanuel Morales as the President's Secretary, Lizy Martínez as Lucy, Said Sandoval as Pérez, Adriana Deangelis as Mrs. Villegas, Ángel Zozaya as Julio.
68	22	"Mulas de armas (parte 2)"	7 April 2020	3.4
Manu and Escamilla face death. Doña Cata surrenders to Juan and Jessica is kidnapped. Cast : Tomás Goros as Juan, Perla Corona as Michelle Machallado, León Michel as Orlando Villegas, Tania Lizardo as Gina, Silvana Garriga as Jessica, Olivia Bucio as Mariela, Emmanuel Morales as the President's Secretary, Lizy Martínez as Lucy, Said Sandoval as Pérez, Adriana Deangelis as Mrs. Villegas, Ángel Zozaya as Julio, José Montini as El lider, Jorge Levy as Comandante Ruíz, Vitter Leija as El Calacas.
69	23	"El Acuartelamiento (parte 1)"	8 April 2020	3.2
Nico and Manu rescue Jessica. Doña Cata, Bere and Manu come to live in Area 16. Escamilla sets a trap for them. Cast : Perla Corona as Michelle Machallado, León Michel as Orlando Villegas, Tomás Goros as Juan, Silvana Garriga as Jessica, Emmanuel Morales as the President's Secretary, Lizy Martínez as Lucy, Said Sandoval as Pérez, Manoly Díaz as Diego "K Jr.", Adriana Deangelis as Mrs. Villegas, Víctor Hugo Arana as Joel, César Beas as Eduardo, Mariana León as La Madame.
70	24	"El Acuartelamiento (parte 2)"	9 April 2020	2.8
While Bere faces Andrea, Manu and Nico will fight. Escamilla causes the embezzlement of accounts generating chaos in the country. Cast : Perla Corona as Michelle Machallado, León Michel as Orlando Villegas, Tomás Goros as Juan, Silvana Garriga as Jessica, Emmanuel Morales as the President's Secretary, Lizy Martínez as Lucy, Said Sandoval as Pérez, Manoly Díaz as Diego "K Jr.", Adriana Deangelis as Mrs. Villegas, Víctor Hugo Arana as Joel, César Beas as Eduardo, Mariana León as La Madame, José Luis Duval as Doctor, Martín Gómez Martí as Tomás.
71	25	"La rendición"	10 April 2020	3.1
Manu surrenders to Escamilla, who discovers that he was used by someone from the power mafia. The Brigadier makes a decision to save the President. Cast : Benjamín Martínez as Mayor Aristegui, León Michel as Orlando Villegas, Tomás Goros as Juan, Perla Corona as Michelle Machallado, Manoly Díaz as Diego "K Jr.", Said Sandoval as Pérez.
72	26	"Compra-venta de autos (parte 1)"	13 April 2020	3.0
Escamilla is transferred to the hospital after the beating. Manu and Andrea have a plan to bring down K Jr. Mario tries to sell his car and is kidnapped. Cast : Perla Corona as Michelle Machallado, Benjamín Martínez as Mayor Aristegui, León Michel as Orlando Villegas, Kairam Castro as Nallely, Luis Curiel as Mario, Manoly Díaz as Diego "K Jr.", Tomás Goros as Juan.
73	27	"Compra-venta de autos (parte 2)"	14 April 2020	3.5
K Jr. kidnaps Aristegui, but Los Vigías has him surrounded. Manu rescues Mario and Juan proposes to Doña Cata. Cast : Perla Corona as Michelle Machallado, Benjamín Martínez as Mayor Aristegui, León Michel as Orlando Villegas, Kairam Castro as Nallely, Luis Curiel as Mario, Manoly Díaz as Diego "K Jr.", Tomás Goros as Juan.
74	28	"El acosador (parte 1)"	15 April 2020	3.2
The Watchers capture K Jr. Andrea disappears and Manu becomes distressed. Dolores is taken hostage during a live broadcast. Cast : Perla Corona as Michelle Machallado, Benjamín Martínez as Mayor Aristegui, León Michel as Orlando Villegas, Manoly Díaz as Diego "K Jr.", Luis José Sevilla as Raymundo, Saúl Alarcón "El Jaguar" as himself, Alejandro Aragón as Fernando, Martha Julia as Dolores, Tomás Goros as Juan, Víctor Hugo Arana as Joel.
75	29	"El acosador (parte 2)"	16 April 2020	3.4
Manu rescues Dolores from the kidnapper and also demands that K Jr. tell her where Andrea is. Bere finds Juan's money and he advances the wedding with Doña Cata. Cast : Perla Corona as Michelle Machallado, Benjamín Martínez as Mayor Aristegui, León Michel as Orlando Villegas, Manoly Díaz as Diego "K Jr.", Luis José Sevilla as Raymundo, Saúl Alarcón "El Jaguar" as himself, Alejandro Aragón as Fernando, Martha Julia as Dolores, Tomás Goros as Juan, Víctor Hugo Arana as Joel.
76	30	"El testigo (parte 1)"	17 April 2020	3.2
Manu discovers that they fell into an Escamilla trap. Doña Cata meets Lety again. Leo witnesses a murder and must flee. Cast : Perla Corona as Michelle Machallado, Víctor Hugo Arana as Joel, Jorge Robles as Apache, Benjamín Martínez as El mayor Aristegui, Hanssel Casillas as Leonardo, Julio Grijalva as Chema, Paulina de Labra as Leonardo's mother, Tomás Goros as Juan.
77	31	"El testigo (parte 2)"	20 April 2020	3.4
Leo surrenders to Chema, but Manu tries to rescue him. Lety tries to speak to Doña Cata, but rejects her. The brigadier is released from prison. Cast : Perla Corona as Michelle Machallado, Víctor Hugo Arana as Joel, Jorge Robles as Apache, Benjamín Martínez as El mayor Aristegui, Hanssel Casillas as Leonardo, Julio Grijalva as Chema, Paulina de Labra as Leonardo's mother, Tomás Goros as Juan.
78	32	"Robo a casa habitación (parte 1)"	21 April 2020	3.3
The Watchers kidnap all members of the mafia from power. Lety wants to repair the damage she did and Nico could be discovered. Cast : Perla Corona as Michelle Machallado, Víctor Hugo Arana as Joel, Juilo César Luna as Officer Mendoza, Josuega Arévalo Meyer as Officer Castro, Said Sandoval as Pérez, Jorge Robles as Apache, Tomás Goros as Juan, Víctor Hugo Arana as Joel.
79	33	"Robo a casa habitación (parte 2)"	22 April 2020	3.3
Lety and Bere meet again. Nico offers Escamilla to help him get revenge on Manu. "Gus" catches the house robbers. Cast : Perla Corona as Michelle Machallado, Víctor Hugo Arana as Joel, Juilo César Luna as Officer Mendoza, Josuega Arévalo Meyer as Officer Castro, Said Sandoval as Pérez, Jorge Robles as Apache, Tomás Goros as Juan, Víctor Hugo Arana as Joel.
80	34	"Amigo fiel (parte 1)"	23 April 2020	3.6
Nico and Manu have a serious accident. Rosy and her mom lose their guide dog and a man demands money from them in exchange to get it back. Cast : Perla Corona as Michelle Machallado, Said Sandoval as Pérez, Jorge Robles as Apache, Kari Romu as Rosy, Dorian Dalí as Pancracio,[Gabriela Zamora as Rosy's mother, Tomás Goros as Juan.
81	35	"Amigo fiel (parte 2)"	24 April 2020	3.6
Manu apologizes to Bere and helps Rosy retrieve her puppy. Doña Cata falls into a new trick of Juan and Nico makes a decision about Andrea. Cast : Perla Corona as Michelle Machallado, Said Sandoval as Pérez, Jorge Robles as Apache, Kari Romu as Rosy, Dorian Dalí as Pancracio, Gabriela Zamora as Rosy's mother, Tomás Goros as Juan.
