= No Fear of Truth: Wake Up =

- Season 2
- Starring: Alex Perea
- No. of episodes: 25

Release
- Original network: Las Estrellas
- Original release: 8 July – 9 August 2019

Season chronology
- ← Previous; You Are No Longer Alone Next → Time to Rise Again

The second season of the Mexican anthology television series Sin miedo a la verdad was announced by Televisa on 4 November 2018. It premiered on 8 July 2019 and ended on 9 August 2019.

This season continues the story of Manu, a brave and idealistic young man who, through a vlog, uses his skills as a hacker to help people who have been victims of injustice.

== Plot ==
After being in a coma for three months and after discovering that his sister Estéfani is alive and is "El Chaka", Manu wakes up and realizes that he has a bullet in his head. Manu tries to recover, when he learns that Bere left him and his vlog "Sin miedo a la verdad" has been hacked by someone who charges in exchange for helping people. Manu will have to flee from an increasingly powerful mafia cop Horacio, look for his sister, find the truth behind the disappearance of Bere and discover the secret that Lety hides, who will continue trying to recover his love. Doña Cata, as always, will remain his unconditional ally, along with Chicho and Genaro.

== Cast ==
- Alex Perea as Manuel "Manu" Montero
- Fermín Martínez as Horacio Escamilla
- Dacia González as Catalina Gómez
- Ligia Uriarte as Lety
- Tania Niebla as Berenice Hidalgo
- Jackie Sauza as Andrea Loera
- Ana Cristina Rubio as Estéfani Montero "El Chaka"
- Paola Miguel as María José Hidalgo
- Paco de la Fuente as Paco
- Víctor Civeira como Chicho

== Episodes ==
No. overall	No. in season	Title	Original release date	Viewers (millions)
22	1	"La revelación"	8 July 2019 (Note: Premiered early online through Las Estrellas website on 1 July 2019.)	3.0
After the confrontation with Horacio, Manu awakens from the coma and the first thing he does is ask for Estéfani and Bere. Horacio is blamed for attacking the delegate. Special guest stars: Héctor Cruz Lara as Dr. Trejo, Benjamín Martínez as Alcalde, Javier Moyano as Salva, Jorge Navarro as Soto, Juan Alejandro Ávila as Meneses, Roberto Ibarra as Gutiérrez, Paola Villalobos as Elena
23	2	"Falsos apóstoles"	9 July 2019	2.7
Horacio asks for help from a strange group to clear his name. Clara accepts the protection of Pastor Benjamín to get rid of cancer, but he has other plans. Special guest stars: Héctor Cruz Lara as Dr. Trejo, Javier Moyano as Salva, Ricardo Crespo as Benjamín, Ana Paola Hernández as Clara, Karolina Gutzce as Alicia, Jorge Navarro as Soto, Juan Alejandro Ávila as Meneses, Iván Bronstein as Oficial, Paola Villalobos as Elena
24	3	"Envenenamiento por plomo"	10 July 2019	2.9
While the police arrive at the hospital to arrest Manu, Martha becomes seriously ill from exposure to chemicals in the textile factory where she works. Special guest stars: Héctor Cruz Lara as Dr. Trejo, Paola Villalobos as Elena, Jorge Navarro as Soto, Juan Alejandro Ávila as Meneses, Iván Bronstein as Oficial, Regina Graniewicz as Renata
25	4	"El hacker"	11 July 2019	2.9
With the help of the organization that protects him, Horacio catches the hacker who has stolen the identity of Gus and will torture him to give information about Manu; Manu will try to rescue him. Genaro proposes to the delegate an alliance against Horacio. Special guest stars: Benjamín Martínez as Alcalde, Iñaki Godoy as El Chinos, Jorge Navarro as Soto, Juan Alejandro Ávila as Meneses, León Michel as Orlando Villegas, Paola Villalobos as Elena
26	5	"Linchamiento equivocado"	12 July 2019	3.0
Vicente is beaten and tortured by the people of Bernal for a crime he did not commit. Horacio prepares a surprise for his wife Elena and her lover. Special guest stars: Iñaki Godoy as El Chinos, Jorge Navarro as Soto, Juan Alejandro Ávila as Meneses, Paola Villalobos as Elena, Javier Moyano as Salva, Jony Ortega as Vicente, Amelia Zapata as Eva, Viri Robles as Alessandra, Juanma Piano as Rafael, Leonardo Albarrán as Toro
27	6	"La trampa"	15 July 2019 (Note: Premiered early online through Las Estrellas website on 15 July 2019.)	2.7
After the failed attempt of Estéfani against Horacio, Andrea will organize a plan to catch the Montero siblings. Doña Cata is about to discover Lety. Manu reunites with his sister after ten years. Special guest stars: Héctor Cruz Lara as Dr. Trejo, Roberto Ibarra as Gutiérrez, Juan Alejandro Ávila as Meneses, Jorge Navarro as Soto, Javier Moyano as Salva, Iñaki Godoy as El Chinos, Paola Villalobos as Elena
28	7	"La ejemplar familia Ramos (parte 1)"	16 July 2019	2.7
Marcela is kidnapped and her boyfriend Fabián discovers that her family is involved. Horacio will make agent González pay for his betrayal. Special guest stars: Jorge Navarro as Soto, Juan Alejandro Ávila as Meneses, Iñaki Godoy as El Chinos, Héctor Alberto Muñoz as Fabián, Eva Daniela as Marcela, Juán Carlos García as Jairo, Astreed Hernández as Isabela, Daniel Marulanda as Camilo
29	8	"La ejemplar familia Ramos (parte 2)"	17 July 2019	2.7
Manu helps Fabián rescue Marcela from her evil family. Estéfani goes against Horacio, but her plan goes out of control, Horacio survives the attack and ends with her life. Special guest stars: Jorge Navarro as Soto, Juan Alejandro Ávila as Meneses, Héctor Alberto Muñoz as Fabián, Eva Daniela as Marcela, Juán Carlos García as Jairo, Astreed Hernández as Isabela, Daniel Marulanda as Camilo, Gabriel Ronquillo as Edgar
30	9	"Los diablitos"	18 July 2019	2.6
Violeta and her brothers are forced by Bertha "La Puerca", the administrator of the foster home, to rob motorists. When Manu discovers them, he will try to help them to have a better life. Andrea begins to doubt Horacio's honesty. Special guest stars: Javier Moyano as Salva, Farah Justiniani as Violeta, Jorge Navarro as Soto, Claudia Bollat as Bertha, Gabriel Ronquillo as Edgar
31	10	"S.O.S."	19 July 2019	2.7
Manu finds the hidden messages that Bere sends him in the letters and discovers that Lety has Bere captive and also that Lety has AIDS. Andrea and Elena betray Horacio. Special guest stars: Javier Moyano as Salva, Jorge Navarro as Soto, Paola Villalobos as Elena, Benjamín Martínez as Alcalde, Iñaki Godoy as El Chinos, Paola Miguel as María José, León Michel as Orlando Villegas
32	11	"La mentira"	22 July 2019 (Note: Premiered early online through Las Estrellas website on 22 July 2019.)	2.7
After not being able to save Bere, Manu suffers a seizure and is operated on to remove the bullet and deceives Lety by telling her that he does not remember anything. Horacio will suffer an attack with terrible consequences. Special guest stars: Iñaki Godoy as El Chinos, Benjamín Martínez as Alcalde, León Michel as Orlando Villegas, Héctor Cruz Lara as Dr. Trejo, Gabriel Ronquillo as Edgar, Noé Alvarado as Javier Mata, Paola Villalobos as Elena, Javier Moyano as Salva
33	12	"Trata laboral (parte 1)"	23 July 2019	2.8
Lupi, Yiya and Wanchi are tricked and forced to fill bottles with adulterated alcohol. Without Lety noticing, Manu and Doña Cata carry out a plan to rescue Bere and Chinos. Special guest stars: Iñaki Godoy as El Chinos, Héctor Cruz Lara as Dr. Trejo, Javier Moyano as Salva, Vanessa Medina as Lupi, Maurilio Ricaño as Wanchi, Ruth Rosas as Doña Chayo, Antonio Monroi as Bernal, Mirel García as Viya
34	13	"Trata laboral (parte 2)"	24 July 2019	2.9
With Paco's help, Manu will do everything possible to rescue Lupi and Bere. Lety receives her punishment. Special guest stars: Iñaki Godoy as El Chinos, Javier Moyano as Salva, Vanessa Medina as Lupi, Maurilio Ricaño as Wanchi, David Ostrosky as Dr. Jaramillo, Paola Miguel as María José, Benjamín Martínez as Alcalde, Mirel García as Viya, Leticia Perdigón as Josefina
35	14	"La bestia de Centenar (parte 1)"	25 July 2019 (Note: Premiered early online through Las Estrellas website on 24 July 2019.)	2.9
In the Centenar, Juan David is dedicated to dismembering people and Cristina will fall into his grip. Finally, Manu and Bere meet again. Lety allies with Horacio to catch them. Manu and Lorea will face each other. Special guest stars: Luis Fernando Peña as Juan David, Leticia Perdigón as Josefina, Eugenia Arreola as Cristina, Alejandra Jurado as Doña María, Benjamín Martínez as Alcalde, Noé Alvarado as Javier Mata, Paola Villalobos as Elena, Alicia Camps as Magda, Claudia Acosta as Yolanda
36	15	"La bestia de Centenar (parte 2)"	26 July 2019	3.2
Manu will try to convince Lorea of his innocence. Doña Mari asks Gus for help finding her daughter Cristina. The power mafia forces Horacio to give Elena a warning for putting his interests at risk. Manu will seek to catch Juan David to make him pay for what he has done. Special guest stars: Luis Fernando Peña as Juan David, Eugenia Arreola as Cristina, Alejandra Jurado as Doña María, Paola Villalobos as Elena, Gabriel Ronquillo as Edgar, Jorge Navarro as Soto, Juan Alejandro Ávila as Meneses, Claudia Acosta as Yolanda
37	16	"Extorsión desde la cárcel"	29 July 2019	2.9
Miry and Roberto are extorted by El Gato from jail. But, later they will be kidnapped and Gato will ask Ricardo to pay for the rescue of his relatives. Horacio discovers a traitor in his team. Special guest stars: Jorge Navarro as Soto, Juan Alejandro Ávila as Meneses, Chao as Alfredo Corona, Fabián Robles as El Gato, Ricardo Díaz as Culei, Anishai as Lupe, Guss Morales as Ricardo, Ignacio Guadalupe as Roberto
38	17	"Rehenes (parte 1)"	30 July 2019	3.0
Several thieves steal a valuable necklace, and in their escape they take Alicia hostage. Horacio kidnaps Andrea to silence her. Special guest stars: Iñaki Godoy as El Chinos, Juan Alejandro Ávila as Meneses, Jorge Navarro as Soto, Benjamín Martínez as Alcalde, Yuliana Peniche as Ángela, Laura Vignatti as Alicia, Jorge Gallegos as Raúl, Felicia Mercado as Lucía del Prado
39	18	"Rehenes (parte 2)"	31 July 2019	2.9
Manu tries to rescue Andrea. On Horacio's orders, El Calacas attempts against the mayor's family. Lety reveals to Horacio who Gus really is. For trying to save Alicia, El Chinos puts his life in danger. Special guest stars: Iñaki Godoy as El Chinos, Juan Alejandro Ávila as Meneses, Jorge Navarro as Soto, Benjamín Martínez as Alcalde, José Carlos Farrera as Jonathan, Ramsés Alemán as Josué, Laura Vignatti as Alicia, Jorge Gallegos as Raúl
40	19	"Rehenes (parte 3)"	1 August 2019	3.1
Manu helps the jewelry thieves in order to save people from the bus. Horacio discovers that Andrea is alive and organizes an operation to kill her. Special guest stars: Iñaki Godoy as El Chinos, Juan Alejandro Ávila as Meneses, Jorge Navarro as Soto, Benjamín Martínez as Alcalde, José Carlos Farrera as Jonathan, Ramsés Alemán as Josué, Yuliana Peniche as Ángela, Laura Vignatti as Alicia, Jorge Gallegos as Raúl
41	20	"El escape"	2 August 2019	3.1
Horacio will be betrayed by the mafia of power and the police already have evidence to detain him. Manu and Andrea kiss. Lety kidnaps Doña Cata to attract Manu and thus kill him. Special guest stars: Jorge Navarro as Soto, Juan Alejandro Ávila as Meneses, Benjamín Martínez as Alcalde, Noé Alvarado as Javier Mata, Iván Bronstein as Ignacio Abascal, Chao as Alfredo Corona, Gabriel Ronquillo as Edgar, Eduardo Liñan as Procurador, Santiago Rodríguez as Joaquín
42	21	"La mafia del poder"	5 August 2019	2.9
The power mafia kidnaps Andrea, Bere and Paco and erase evidence against Horacio. Manu will investigate who is behind everything while trying to rescue his family. Special guest stars: Jorge Navarro as Soto, Juan Alejandro Ávila as Meneses, Benjamín Martínez as Alcalde, Noé Alvarado as Javier Mata, León Michel as Orlando Villegas, Gabriel Ronquillo as Edgar, Santiago Rodríguez as Joaquín
43	22	"Escorts"	6 August 2019	3.1
The power mafia blackmails Manu in exchange for his family. Gaby arrives in Mexico to work as a model, but is ripped off by Alfonso. Horacio is released. Special guest stars: Benjamín Martínez as Alcalde, León Michel as Orlando Villegas, Gabriel Ronquillo as Edgar, Gaby Mezone as Gaby, Chao as Alfredo Corona, Iván Bronstein as Ignacio Abascal, María José Magán as Bárbara, Eduardo Yáñez as Emiliano Lozada
44	23	"La regresión"	7 August 2019	3.0
The president gives Manu 24 hours to amend what he did. Andrea undergoes hypnosis to remember what happened and Gaby is sold to Horacio. Special guest stars: Jorge Navarro as Soto, Benjamín Martínez as Alcalde, Ricardo Silva as Dr. Otto, Gabriel Ronquillo as Edgar, Gaby Mezone as Gaby, Chao as Alfredo Corona, Iván Bronstein as Ignacio Abascal, María José Magán as Bárbara, Eduardo Yáñez as Emiliano Lozada
45	24	"Área 16"	8 August 2019	3.1
Manu and Loera infiltrate the residence where his family is kidnapped and the president sends them to Area 16. Horacio meets his future wife. Special guest stars: Jorge Navarro as Soto, Benjamín Martínez as Alcalde, Gabriel Ronquillo as Edgar, Chao as Alfredo Corona, Iván Bronstein as Ignacio Abascal, Gaby Mezone as Gaby, Anna Ciocchetti as Brigadier Mora, Eduardo Yáñez as Emiliano Lozada
46	25	"No doblaré las manos"	9 August 2019	3.3
Manu, with the help of Area 16, will try to rescue his family from the mafia of power. Andrea finds a traitor inside the president's cabinet and Horacio prepares a trap. Special guest stars: Jorge Navarro as Soto, Benjamín Martínez as Alcalde, Gabriel Ronquillo as Edgar, Chao as Alfredo Corona, Iván Bronstein as Ignacio Abascal, Perla Corona as Michelle Machallado, Anna Ciocchetti as Brigadier Mora, Eduardo Yáñez as Emiliano Lozada
