= No Fear of Truth: You Are No Longer Alone =

Mexican television series

- Season 1
- No. of episodes: 21

Release
- Original network: Las Estrellas
- Original release: 8 October – 4 November 2018

Season chronology
- Next → Wake Up

The first season of the Mexican anthology television series Sin miedo a la verdad created by Rubén Galindo premiered on Las Estrellas on 8 October 2018, and concluded on 4 November 2018. The first season consists of 21 episodes.

== Plot ==
Manu is an introverted man with special abilities, not only to repair cell phones, but to violate systems and passwords. Thanks to Doña Cata, his mentor, he has managed to survive hidden from a cruel past that still haunts him, leaving a terrible shadow in his soul and marking on his face. Manu works in the Plaza de la Computación, where they repair, adjust and get any kind of electronic devices and the only way Manu has to deal with the pain his past causes him is, helping others, so that through his vlog "Sin miedo a la verdad", he will be who anonymously protects those who have been victims of some injustice. As Manu goes about solving cases, he is persecuted by devil policeman Horacio, a corrupt cop, main perpetrator and responsible for the murder of Manu and Estefani's father, who wants to take revenge on Manu for killing his rapist brother and dirty cop.

== Cast ==
- Alex Perea as Manuel "Manu" Montero
- Dacia González as Catalina Gómez
- Tania Niebla as Berenice Hidalgo
- Ligia Uriarte as Lety
- Fermín Martínez as Horacio Escamilla
- Israel Islas as Isidro Escamilla
- Paola Miguel as María José Hidalgo
- Arturo Nahum as Alberto Gómez "Pila"
- Carlos Barragán as Cuauhtémoc Sánchez "El Bolillo"
- Ana Cristina Rubio as Estefani Montero
- Catalina López as Amanda
- Víctor Cerveira as Chicho
- Eugenio Montessoro as Alfredo Alonso

== Episodes ==
No. overall	No. in season	Title	Original release date	Mexico viewers (millions)
1	1	"Mirreyes impunes"	8 October 2018	3.7
2	2	"Secuestro a periodista"	9 October 2018	2.9
3	3	"Los niños de La Ballena Azul"	10 October 2018	3.2
4	4	"Traficantes de órganos"	11 October 2018	3.1
5	5	"Narcomenudistas online"	12 October 2018	2.9
6	6	"Trata de personas"	15 October 2018	3.2
7	7	"Golpeador de mujeres"	16 October 2018	3.2
8	8	"Robo de bebés"	17 October 2018	3.4
9	9	"Las Goteras VIP parte 1"	18 October 2018	3.0
10	10	"Las Goteras VIP parte 2"	19 October 2018	3.0
11	11	"Despedida de soltera parte 1"	22 October 2018	2.9
12	12	"Despedida de soltera parte 2"	23 October 2018	3.1
13	13	"Derecho de piso"	24 October 2018	3.2
14	14	"Rehenes en el banco"	25 October 2018	3.3
15	15	"El Stalker"	26 October 2018	3.0
16	16	"La extorsión"	29 October 2018	3.0
17	17	"A contra tiempo"	30 October 2018	3.1
18	18	"La confusión"	31 October 2018	2.9
19	19	"El intercambio"	1 November 2018	2.9
20	20	"El escape"	2 November 2018	3.0
21	21	"La verdad"	4 November 2018	3.4
