= List of TV Azteca telenovelas and series =

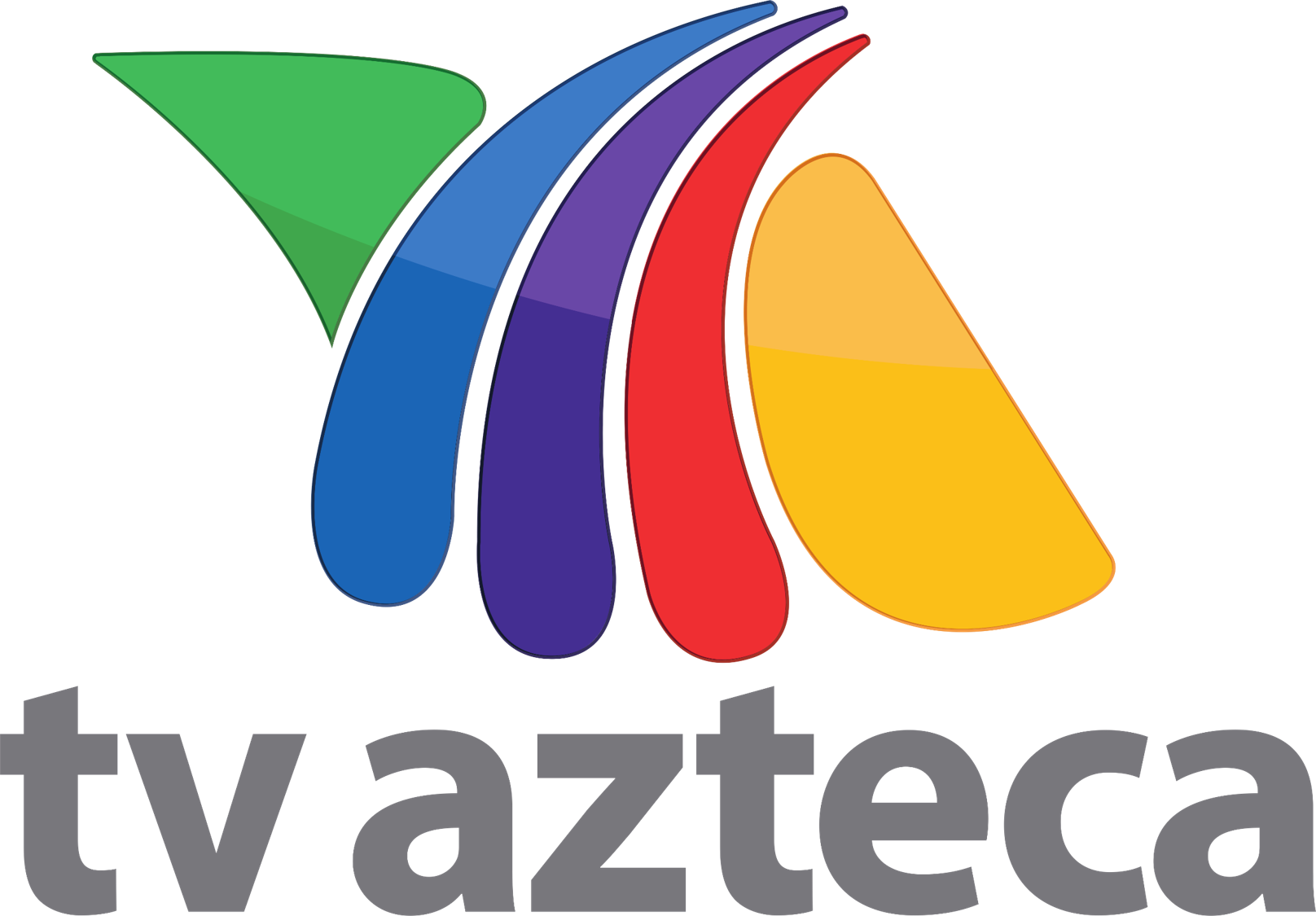

The following is a chronological list of telenovelas produced by TV Azteca:

== Filmography ==
=== 1990s ===
Title	Year	Producer	Ref(s)
El peñón del amaranto	1993	Víctor Hugo O'Farrill	
A flor de piel	1994	Víctor Hugo O'Farrill	
Con toda el alma	1995	Alejandra Hernández	
Nada personal	1996	Maika Bernard	
Te dejaré de amar	1996	Alejandra Hernández	
Tric trac	1996	Norma Ruiz Esparza, Juan Carlos Muñoz	
Rivales por accidente	1997	Michel Strauss	
Al norte del corazón	1997	Santiago Galindo, Rubén Galindo	
Mirada de mujer	1997	Marcela Mejía	
La chacala	1997	Christian Bach, Humberto Zurita	
Demasiado corazón	1997	Sachiko Uzeta	
Chiquititas	1998	Unknown producer	
Perla	1998	José Ambrís	
Tentaciones	1998	Marcela Mejía	
Señora	1998	Alejandra Hernández	
Tres veces Sofía	1998	Luis Vélez, Rossana Arau	
La casa del naranjo	1998	Rafael Gutiérrez	
Azul tequila	1998	Christian Bach, Humberto Zurita	
El amor de mi vida	1998	Mónica Skorlich	
Yacaranday	1999	Alejandro Gavira, Gustavo Gavira	
Catalina y Sebastián	1999	Antulio Jiménez Pons	
Romántica obsesión	1999	José Ambrís	
La vida en el espejo	1999	Marcela Mejía	
El candidato	1999	Christian Bach, Humberto Zurita, Gerardo Zurita	
Marea brava	1999	Alejandra Hernández	
Besos prohibidos	1999	Juan Carlos Muñoz, Fernando Chacón, Manuel Ruiz Esparza	
Háblame de amor	1999	Luis Vélez, Rossana Arau	

=== 2000s ===
#	Year	Telenovela	Producer	Ref.
28	2000	Ellas, inocentes o culpables	Antulio Jiménez Pons	
29	2000	La calle de las novias	Christian Bach; Humberto Zurita; Gerardo Zurita	
30	2000	Todo por amor	Mónica Skorlich	
31	2000	Golpe bajo	José Rendón; Rafael Gutiérrez	
32	2000	Tío Alberto	Luis Vélez; Rossana Arau	
33	2000	El amor no es como lo pintan	Antulio Jiménez Pons	
34	2001	Uroboros	Guillermo González Camarena	
35	2001	Amores, querer con alevosía	Luis Vélez; Rossana Arau	
36	2001	Como en el cine	Antulio Jiménez Pons	
37	2001	Cuando seas mía	Rafael Gutiérrez	
38	2001	Lo que es el amor	Alicia Carvajal	
39	2002	Agua y aceite	Christian Bach; Humberto Zurita; Gerardo Zurita	
40	2002	Sin permiso de tus padres	Christian Bach; Humberto Zurita; Gerardo Zurita	
41	2002	Por ti	Rafael Gutiérrez; Fides Velasco	
42	2002	El país de las mujeres	Georgina Balzaretti	
43	2002	Súbete a mi moto	Antulio Jiménez Pons; Gerardo Zurita	
44	2002	La duda	Fides Velasco	
45	2003	Enamórate	Gerardo Zurita	
46	2003	Un nuevo amor	Fides Velasco	
47	2003	Mirada de mujer, el regreso	Fides Velasco	
48	2003	Dos chicos de cuidado en la ciudad	Carlos Márquez	
49	2003	La hija del jardinero	Igor Manrique	
50	2004	Soñarás	Eloy Ganuza	
51	2004	Belinda	Igor Manrique	
52	2004	La heredera	Henry Ramos; Gerardo Zurita	
53	2004	Las Juanas	Fides Velasco	
54	2004	Los Sánchez	Ángel Mele	
55	2005	La otra mitad del sol	Patricia Benítez Laucín; Jorge Ríos Villanueva	
56	2005	Top models	Miguel Ángel Rodríguez	
57	2005	Ni una vez más	Genoveva Martínez	
58	2005	Amor en custodia	Claudio Meilán; Betina Sancha	
59	2005	Machos	Carlos Márquez	
60	2006	Si se puede	Genoveva Martínez	
61	2006	Ni una vez más	Genoveva Martínez	
62	2006	Deja qué la vida te despeine	Genoveva Martínez	
63	2006	Amor sin condiciones	Igor Manrique	
64	2006	Amores cruzados	Feliciano Torres; Dago García	
65	2006	Montecristo	Rita Fusaro	
66	2006	Campeones de la vida	Gabriela Valentán	
67	2006	Ángel, las alas del amor	Carlos Márquez; Julio De Rose	
68	2007	Se busca un hombre	Genoveva Martínez	
69	2007	Mientras haya vida	Marcela Mejía	
70	2007	Bellezas indomables	Carlos Márquez	
71	2008	Vivir sin ti	Daniel Camhi	
72	2008	Tengo todo excepto a ti	Rita Fusaro	
73	2008	Alma legal	Genoveva Martínez	
74	2008	Pobre rico, pobre	Carlos Márquez	
75	2008	Noche eterna	Fides Velasco; Guillermo Zubiaur	
76	2008	Deseo prohíbido	Iván Aranda	
77	2008	Contrato de amor	—N/a	
78	2008	Cachito de mi corazón	Genoveva Martínez	
79	2008	Secretos del alma	Fides Velasco	
80	2009	Eternamente tuya	Óscar Guarín	
81	2009	Vuélveme a querer	Alicia Ávila	
82	2009	Pasión morena	Rita Fusaro; Claudio Meilán	
83	2009	Pobre Diabla	Fides Velasco	
84	2009	Mujer comprada	Rafael Urióstegui	

=== 2010s ===
Title	Year	Producer	Ref(s)
La loba	2010	María del Carmen Marcos	
Vidas robadas	2010	Georgina Castro Ruiz, Fides Velasco	
Quiéreme tonto	2010	Igor Manrique, Genoveva Martínez	
Prófugas del destino	2010	Rafael Urióstegui	
Entre el amor y el deseo	2010	María del Carmen Marcos	
Emperatriz	2011	Fides Velasco	
Cielo rojo	2011	Rafael Urióstegui	
Bajo el alma	2011	Fabián Corres	
Huérfanas	2011	Fernando Sariñana	
A corazón abierto	2011	Alberto Santini Lara, Pedro Lira	
La mujer de Judas	2012	María del Carmen Marcos	
Quererte así	2012	Rafael Urióstegui	
Amor cautivo	2012	Fernando Sariñana	
Los Rey	2012	Pedro Lira	
La otra cara del alma	2012	Rita Fusaro	
Vivir a destiempo	2013	Fides Velasco	
Destino	2013	María del Carmen Marcos	
Secretos de familia	2013	Rita Fusaro	
Corazón en condominio	2013	Rafael Gutiérrez	
Hombre tenías que ser	2013	Luis Urquiza	
Prohibido amar	2013	Rafael Urióstegui	
Siempre tuya Acapulco	2014	Rita Fusaro	
Las Bravo	2014	María del Carmen Marcos	
Así en el barrio como en el cielo	2015	Fides Velasco	
UEPA! Un escenario para amar	2015	Rafael Gutiérrez	
Caminos de Guanajuato	2015	Javier Pons	
Entre correr y vivir	2016	Javier Ayala	
Rosario Tijeras	2016	Ximena Cantuarias, Juan Pablo Posada, Daniel Ucrós	
La fiscal de hierro	2017	Manolo Cardona, Ana Celia Urquidi	
Nada personal	2017	Fides Velasco	
Las Malcriadas	2017	Ana Celia Urquidi, Joshua Mintz	
3 familias	2017	Ana Celia Urquidi, Joshua Mintz	
La hija pródiga	2017	Ana Celia Urquidi, Joshua Mintz	
Educando a Nina	2018	Ana Celia Urquidi, Joshua Mintz	
Tres Milagros	2018	Harold Sánchez	
María Magdalena	2019		
La Bandida	2019	Andrés Santamaría	
Hernán	2019		

=== 2020s ===
No.	Title	Season	Creator(s)	Executive Producer(s)	Original release		Ref.
No.	Title	Season	Creator(s)	Executive Producer(s)	First aired	Last aired	Ref.
2020
1	Desaparecida	1 season, 80 episodes	Sebastián Arrau	Joshua Mintz	17 January 2020	24 January 2020	
2021
2	Un día para vivir	TBD	Héctor Forero; David Mascareño	Rafael Urióstegui	6 September 2021	TBA	
2022
3	Rutas de la vida	1 season, 60 episodes	Luis Felipe Ybarra	Rafael Urióstegui	14 March 2022	7 July 2022	
3	Supertitlán	1 season, 48 episodes	Amaya Muruzábal	Karina Blanco; César Rodríguez	30 May 2022	18 August 2022	
4	Lotería del crimen	3 seasons, 72 episodes	Adrián Ortega Echegollén	Rodrigo Hernández Cruz	10 October 2022	TBA	
2023
5	Dra. Lucía, un don extraordinario	2 seasons, 100 episodes	Adrián Ortega Echegollén	Martín Garza Cisneros	2 October 2023	TBA	
2025
6	Cautiva por amor	1 season, 70 episodes	Cecilia Guerty; Pablo Junovich	Luis Urquiza	12 May 2025	15 August 2025	
