= List of programs broadcast by Azteca América =

This is a list of programs broadcast by the now-defunct U.S. Spanish-language television network Azteca América.

== Final programming ==
=== Telenovelas/series ===
- A cada quien su santo
- Están entre nosotros
- Mujeres rompiendo el silencio
- Pobre Diabla
- Las Juanas
- Prófugas del destino

=== Talk/reality ===
- Cocinísima
- Dificil de Creer
- El objetivo del crimen
- El oscuro paseo de la fama
- Extranormal
- Entrañas de lo prohibido
- Escape perfecto
- Hablemos de cine
- La Isla
- Lo que la gente cuenta
- Mentes Retorcidas
- Miss Universo
- Relatos Misteriosos
- Todo un show
- Venga la Alegría
- Ventaneando

=== News ===
- Al Extremo
- Al Extremo en 30
- Al Extremo Fin de Semana
- Hechos
- Hechos AM
- Noticiero Hechos Local

=== Sports programming ===
- Box Azteca
- Lucha Azteca
- Pasión Deportiva

=== Comedy ===
- Ya Cayo Renovado

=== Children's programming ===
- Super Libro

== Former programming ==
=== Telenovelas/series ===
- 11-11: En mi cuadra nada cuadra (May 19, 2014 – August 29, 2014)
- Amor en Custodia (2005 – 2006)
- Así en el barrio como en el cielo (July 3, 2017 – December 15, 2017)
- Azul Tequila (2006; 2009)
- Baila Reggaeton (2007)
- Bajo el alma (July 16, 2018 – September 21, 2018)
- Belinda (2004 – 2005)
- Bellezas Indomables (2008)
- Campeones de la vida (2007)
- Catalina y Sebastián (2008 – 2009)
- Cielo rojo (2011-2012)
- Como en el cine (2004)
- Contrato de Amor (May 21, 2018 – August 17, 2018)
- Cuando seas mía (2006)
- Demasiado Corazón (2002)
- Dos Chicos de Cuidado en la Ciudad (2003 – 2004)
- El amor no es como lo pintan
- El beso del escorpión (March 6, 2017 – December 4, 2017)
- Emperatriz (2012 – 2012)
- Entre correr y vivir (January 15, 2018 – March 9, 2018)
- Grachi (February 4, 2014 – May 16, 2014)
- Hombre tenías que ser (April 2, 2018 – May 18, 2018)
- La Chacala (2005 – 2006)
- La Hija del Jardinero (2003)
- La Loba (2010)
- La Otra Cara del Alma (2013)
- La otra mitad del sol (2005)
- Las Juanas (2004-2005)
- Lo que callamos las mujeres
- Lo que es el amor (2002; 2004 – 2005)
- Marea Brava (2002 – 2003)
- Mientras haya vida (2008)
- Mirada de mujer (2006 – 2007)
- Montecristo (2007; 2011 – 2012)
- Mujer comprada (March 7, 2016 – September 16, 2016)
- Olvide que te quería (April 18, 2016 – August 19, 2016; June 26, 2017 – January 2018)
- Quiéreme tonto (2016)
- Los Sánchez (2005 – 2006)
- Se Busca Un Hombre (2007)
- Señora (2008 – 2009)
- Siempre tuya Acapulco (July 3, 2017 – January 5, 2018)
- Soñarás (2004 – 2005)
- Súbete a mi moto (2005)
- UEPA! Un escenario para amar (December 4, 2017 – March 30, 2018)
- Un día cualquiera (July 3, 2017 – August 25, 2017)
- Verdades Secretas (April 24, 2017 – June 30, 2017)
- Violetta (September 1, 2014 – December 19, 2014)
- Vis a vis (October 1, 2017 – 2018)

=== Comedy/variety programming ===
- Ahora caigo!
- Fábrica de Huevos
- Infarto
- Tunéame La Nave (2011)

=== Talk/reality shows ===
- Asesinos seriales
- A quien corresponda
- Cosas de la vida
- Desafio Marruecos
- El club de Eva (January 15, 2018 – May 4, 2018)
- El Hormiguero
- Enamorándonos (2017)
- Ella es Niurka (2011)
- La Academia
- Las Entradas de los Prohibido
- Las tardes con la Bigorra (2016 – February 13, 2017)
- Laura de Todos
- ¿Qué hay de comer?
- Tatiana (2012)
- Venga el Domingo

=== Sports programming ===
- Deporte Caliente
- Fútbol Méxicano Primera Divisíon
- Los Protagonistas

=== Children's programming ===
- Bucaneros
- Cybercuates
- Kenny the Shark (December 1, 2013 – June 1, 2014)
- Reino Animal
- Tutenstein (December 1, 2013 – June 1, 2014)
