= Azteca Estudios =

Mexican film-television production company

- Company type: Private
- Industry: Production company
- Founded: May 24, 1996; 30 years ago (as Azteca Digital)
- Founder: Ricardo Salinas Pliego; Elisa Salinas; Juan David Burns
- Headquarters: Coyoacán, Mexico City, Mexico
- Key people: Guillermo Wilkins González (Managing Director)
- Products: Telenovelas; Television series Production services
- Owner: TV Azteca
- Parent: Grupo Salinas
- Website: https://aztecaestudios.com/

Azteca Estudios (English: Azteca Studios) is a Mexican production company owned by TV Azteca, founded in 1996 by producers Elisa Salinas and Juan David Burns in which it focuses on the direction and production of fiction, specifically telenovelas and television series.

== History ==
In 1993, after the privatization of Imevisión and its sale to businessman Ricardo Salinas Pliego, the acquisition of Estudios América would include Compañía Operadora de Teatros S.A de C.V and company of movie theaters. In 1995, the newly founded TV Azteca would launch its first telenovela Con toda el alma, as a result of a partnership started by Ricardo Salinas Pliego, Elisa Salinas and Juan David Burns.

In 1996, after having finished Con todo el alma, Azteca Digital would be born under David Burns, Elisa and Ricardo Salinas, using the existing infrastructure of what were once Estudios América, her first production as a producer was the telenovela Nada personal by Epigmenio Ibarra with Argos Comunicación as co-producing partner. As co-producing partners with Azteca Digital in its beginnings, they were Argos Comunicación until 2001, and ZUBA Producciones of the actors Christian Bach and Humberto Zurita until 2002. In 2000, Elisa created the popular and successful anthology series Lo que callamos las mujeres, with 2777 episodes aired until 2017 lasting 17 years on the air.

In 2003, Elisa leaves the general management of Azteca Digital, upon being promoted as general director of the KAZA-TV Canal 54 station of Azteca América, Martín Luna enters as her successor and renaming the subsidiary as TV Azteca Novelas. During Luna's management, productions were carried out with success in audience, Los Sánchez and Amor en custodia are some of them, the making of television movies and the production of the first telenovela in high definition Amores cruzados in conjunction with the Colombian television company Caracol Televisión. In 2006, a production agreement was signed again with Epigmenio Ibarra's Argos Comunicación, for the production of some telenovelas, Mientras haya vida, Vivir sin ti and Deseo prohibido.

In 2008 Martín Luna would leave Azteca Novelas and as a replacement, the executive Mario San Román took over as the general director of both Azteca Novelas and Azteca Trece until 2012, when Elisa Salinas would once again take over the general direction of telenovelas.

During the restructuring of TV Azteca in 2015 after the rise of Benjamín Salinas Sada as CEO of the company, in 2016 the former executive vice president of production of Telemundo Global Studios, Joshua Mintz would be integrated to take the position that Elisa had as general director of Azteca Novelas, being deputy president and fiction director of TV Azteca, to reinforce the strategic design and contribute to the long-term vision of the company, as well as being part of its reinvention process. Also the former general producer of Argos, Ana Celia Urquidi would join Mintz taking charge of talent coordination.

During the management of Mintz and Urquidi, a production alliance would be established with Sony Pictures Television Latinoamérica, Teleset and 11:11 Films for the production of telenovelas and television series, the executive production in charge of the productions Las Malcriadas, Educando a Nina and Desaparecida, and general supervision of other projects. In May 2018, the departure of Joshua Mintz and Ana Celia Urquidi from TV Azteca would be officially announced, after the television station's commitment to reality show formats and the transformation of Azteca Uno into a 100% live one completely closing the section of telenovelas and series.

On February 16, 2021, Grupo Salinas and the Executive Vice President of TV Azteca Internacional Patricia Jasin, announce the launch of Azteca Estudios with the infrastructure of the extinct TV Azteca Novelas, mainly serving the high demand for production in Mexico City, not only for TV Azteca as the main client for internal production, but also for other production companies that lack the necessary infrastructure. Said production complex was rehabilitated to be used with all biosecurity measures in the face of the COVID-19 pandemic in Mexico. On December 1, 2021, the departure of Patricia Jasin would be announced to focus on future projects outside of TV Azteca, on December 17 the incorporation of Guillermo Wilkins González as the new general director of Azteca Estudios was announced.

== See also ==
- TV Azteca Telenovelas and Series
- Estudios América
