= Julieta Egurrola =

Mexican actress (born 1953)

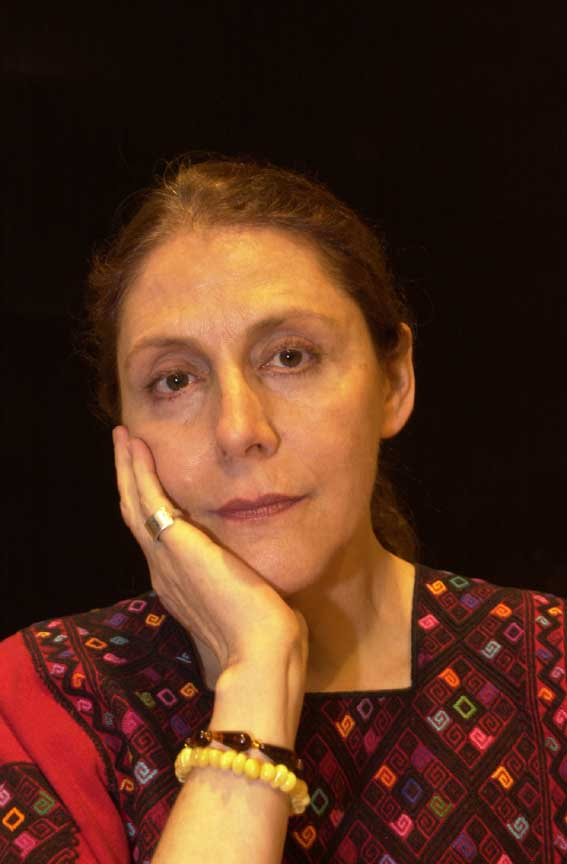
- Born: 13 June 1953; Mexico City
- Occupation: Actress
- Spouse: Arturo Beristáin
- Children: Natalia Beristáin Egurrola

Julieta Egurrola (born 13 June 1953) is a Mexican actress. She studied acting at Centro Universitario de Teatro and has participated in more than 41 theater plays.

== Filmography ==
=== Film ===
- El infierno tan temido (1975)
- María de mi corazón (1979)
- La mujer perfecta (1979) – Claudia
- Enroque (1981)
- Un frágil retorno (1981)
- Las apariencias engañan (1983)
- Cartas a Maria Teresa (1989)
- Revenge (1990)
- Mina (1992)
- Principio y fin (1993) – Ignacia Botero
- Jonás y la ballena rosada (1995)
- Profundo carmesí (1996) – Juanita Norton
- Fin de juego (1998)
- El evangelio de las Maravillas (1998) – Tomasa's mother
- Crónica de un desayuno (1999) – Seño Fonda
- En el país de no pasa nada (2000) – Elena Lascuráin
- Otilia Rauda (2001) – Otilia's mother
- Santos peregrinos (2004) – Juanita
- Efectos secundarios (2006) – Carola
- Familia tortuga (2006)
- Revotando (2007)
- Amor letra por letra (2008) – Consuelo
- Pentimento (2009)
- Noise (2022) – Julia

=== Television ===
- Mamá campanita (1978)
- Pasiones encendidas (1978)
- El cielo es para todos (1979)
- El árabe (1980) – Diana
- Bodas de odio (1983) – Josefina de Icaza
- Tú o nadie (1985) – Meche
- Martín Garatuza (1986) – Sarmiento
- La pobre señorita Limantour (1987)
- Quinceañera (1987) – Carmen Fernández
- Encadenados (1988) – Jacinta
- Dulce desafío (1989) – Refugio
- Yo compro esa mujer (1990) – Isabel de Marín
- Atrapada (1991) – Fina
- Triángulo (1992) – Ana Linares de Villafranca
- Prisionera de amor (1994) – Flavia Monasterios
- El vuelo del águila (1994) – Luisa Romero Rubio
- Si Dios me quita la vida (1995) – Antonieta
- La culpa (1996) – Irma
- Señora (1998) – Dolores / Victoria Santacruz
- Háblame de amor (1999) – Laura de Toledo
- La calle de las novias (2000) – Diana de Mendoza
- La duda (2002) – Teresa
- Cara o cruz (2002) – Matilde Sosa de Alcántara
- Mirada de mujer: El regreso (2003)
- La Heredera (2004) – Dulce Regina Sergio Torres
- Machos (2005) – Valentina Fernández
- Montecristo (2006) – Sara
- Vivir por ti (2008) – Mercedes
- La Loba (2010) – La Güera
- Emperatriz (2011) – Perfecta Jurado
- Los Rey (2012) – Julia's mother
- Mujeres de negro (2016) – Isabella de Zamora
- Caer en tentación (2017) – Miriam
- Armas de mujer (2022) – Enriqueta Zuazo
- Amanecer (2025) – Leticia Galván
