= List of Los Rey episodes =

Los Rey (It All Stays in the Family) is a Mexican telenovela produced by Elisa Salinas for Azteca. It stars Leonardo Garcia, with Michel Brown and Rossana Najera as the protagonists, both dubbed as "La pareja" in the face card, alongside Juan Alfonso Baptista, Ana Belena, Fernando Alonso, Cecilia Ponce, Jose Alonso, Ofelia Medina, Fernando Lujan, Ariel Lopez Padilla, Victor Huggo Martin and Elizabeth Cervantes. Rafael Gutiérrez and Rodrigo Cachero serve as the directors. Los Rey is written by Luis Felipe Ybarra who is also the associate producer. From 3 September 2012 to 22 February 2013, Azteca 13 broadcast Los Rey, replacing La mujer de Judas.

== Episodes ==
Air Date	Number	Episode Title	Rating	Duration
September 3, 2012	001	Los Rey	7.6	60 minutes
September 4, 2012	002	Lorenza le confiesa a su padre que es casado	7.0	57 minutes
September 5, 2012	003	Paola querrá saber si Lorenza está embarazada	6.9	47 minutes
September 6, 2012	004	Una misteriosa mujer llega del pasado de Matías	6.6	47 minutes
September 7, 2012	005	Pedro sabrá que su hija está embarazada	6.0	47 minutes
September 10, 2012	006	Lorenza investigará sobre el boxeo, para qué	5.3	47 minutes
September 11, 2012	007	Pedro Luis le dirá a Lorenza que es capaz de todo por destruir a Los Rey	5.4	41 minutes
September 12, 2012	008	Lorenza se descubrió que Julia fue quien le dio los documentos a Pedro Luis	5.7	44 minutes
September 13, 2012	009	Los Rey	6.3	41 minutes
September 14, 2012	010	Vado no puede creer que Lorenza vaya a tener un hijo	6.1	41 minutes
September 17, 2012	011	Lorenza fue víctima de la venganza de Atilio	6.3	41 minutes
September 18, 2012	012	Matías se lleva de emergencia a Lorenza al hospital	6.8	43 minutes
September 19, 2012	013	Los Rey	6.9	42 minutes
September 20, 2012	014	La policia busca a Matías	5.7	44 minutes
September 21, 2012	015	Ismael discute con Paola	5.5	41 minutes
September 24, 2012	016	El Chino no descansará hasta conquistar a Lorenza	6.0	42 minutes
September 25, 2012	017	Vado le pide a otro que embarace a su mujer	5.7	41 minutes
September 26, 2012	018	Memo está a punto de ir en búsqueda de su familia, qué hará Vado para impedirlo	5.8	43 minutes
September 27, 2012	019	Matías irá a sacar a Memo de la cárcel	5.9	43 minutes
September 28, 2012	020	Los Rey	6.1	42 minutes
October 1, 2012	021	Matías intenta sacar a Memo de la cárcel sin saber que mató a su esposa	5.3	39 minutes
October 2, 2012	022	Los Rey	5.4	39 minutes
October 3, 2012	023	Everardo estará grave	5.3	40 minutes
October 4, 2012	024	Matías caerá en los brazos de su ex novia	6.1	40 minutes
October 5, 2012	025	Los Rey	6.0	41 minutes
October 8, 2012	026	Guillermo intentó matarse, y Matías lo presintió	6.1	41 minutes
October 9, 2012	027	Matías ya no sabe como regresar con Lorenza	5.7	39 minutes
October 10, 2012	028	Mani tuvo un hijo antes de casarse con Everardo	5.4	35 minutes
October 11, 2012	029	Vado discute con Matías	6.2	40 minutes
October 12, 2012	030	N/A	5.9	40 minutes
October 15, 2012	031	Lorenza y Matías vuelven a unir sus cuerpos	5.7	39 minutes
October 16, 2012	032	Lorenza y Matías por fin regresaron, esta vez lograrán ser felices	5.0	38 minutes
October 17, 2012	033	Lorenza está reconciliandose con Matías a pesar de sus familias	6.2	42 minutes
October 18, 2012	034	Vado es detenido por la policía Judicial por la muerte de Ismael Rey	5.9	42 minutes
October 19, 2012	035	Matías le dice a Vado que no cree en él y sabe que mató a Ismael	5.5	41 minutes
October 22, 2012	036	¿Fina llegará a impedir el matrimonio de Amado con Tamara?	5.5	36 minutes
October 23, 2012	037	Lorenza y Matías aclaran la nota que le dejó El Chino Matus	5.1	38 minutes
October 24, 2012	038	Fina está en la garras de Leonardo	5.9	36 minutes
October 25, 2012	039	Guillermo Rey está de regreso y Vado no podrá con la noticia	5.6	38 minutes
October 26, 2012	040	Memo le dice a Fina que su madre murió por su culpa	5.8	37 minutes
October 29, 2012	041	Lorenza se meterá de nuevo al Rey de Reyes	5.3	39 minutes
October 30, 2012	042	Por fin Memo volverá a ver a su padre pero no soportó la presión	5.0	34 minutes
October 31, 2012	043	Everardo sufre una caída del caballo y sabe que está derrotado	5.4	38 minutes
November 1, 2012	044	Pedro Malvido recibe una impactante visita	4.1	38 minutes
November 2, 2012	045	Vado intentó hablar con Matías sobre el manejo de la empresa de Los Rey	5.2	35 minutes
November 5, 2012	046	N/A	4.2	38 minutes
November 6, 2012	047	Paola se reencuentra con Memo y le dice que no le cree para nada su cambio	4.9	37 minutes
November 7, 2012	048	El Chino Matus corre peligro por aliarse con gente que no debía	5.2	36 minutes
November 8, 2012	049	Pedro descubre ante Mani las mentiras de Everardo	5.2	38 minutes
November 9, 2012	050	Manuela no puede con la culpa que la rodea	5.2	38 minutes
November 12, 2012	051	Fina está confundida por lo que siente por Amado	4.8	39 minutes
November 13, 2012	052	Los Rey	4.3	37 minutes
November 14, 2012	053	Aurora llama a Matías y Lorenza sabe que algo malo está pasando	4.9	37 minutes
November 15, 2012	054	Vado le dice a Memo que él ha sido como un padre para Fina	4.4	36 minutes
November 16, 2012	055	Fina está con Leonardo y todos Los Rey la buscarán hasta encontrarla	4.7	39 minutes
November 19, 2012	056	Los Rey	4.6	36 minutes
November 20, 2012	057	Los Rey	4.4	36 minutes
November 21, 2012	058	Lorenza ya no soporta el descaro de Rosario al querer conquistar a Matías	4.7	32 minutes
November 22, 2012	059	Leonardo perderá la vida en el enfrentamiento con la gente de Ronco y Fina está muy grave	N/A	37 minutes
November 23, 2012	060	Matías y Lorenza se aman a pesar de todo lo que ha pasado	4.5	37 minutes
November 26, 2012	061	Los Rey	4.7	40 minutes
November 27, 2012	062	Everardo va por Julia y la llevará aunque ella no quiera a la boda de Matías	4.5	40 minutes
November 28, 2012	063	Llegó el día de la boda de Lorenza y Matías, pero también de Vado y Aurora	5.7	37 minutes
November 29, 2012	064	Lorenza está destrozada por el engaño del amor de su vida Matías	4.5	40 minutes
November 30, 2012	065	Manuela está a punto de matar a Everardo para acabar con todo el daño	4.8	38 minutes
December 3, 2012	066	Ismael está de regreso y la Chula no puede creerlo	4.9	39 minutes
December 4, 2012	067	N/A	4.9	39 minutes
December 5, 2012	068	N/A	N/A	39 minutes
December 6, 2012	069	¿Lorenza querrá darse una oportunidad con El Chino?	N/A	39 minutes
December 7, 2012	070	Los Rey	4.9	39 minutes
December 10, 2012	071	Rosario le pide a Lorenza que renuncie del proyecto de la compañía de Los Rey	4.9	37 minutes
December 11, 2012	072	N/A	N/A	40 minutes
December 12, 2012	073	Pedro Malvido apoya a Lorenza en lo que está pasando con Matías	N/A	36 minutes
December 13, 2012	074	Fina no quiere que Amado se entere que es el padre de su hijo	N/A	36 minutes
December 14, 2012	075	Vado amenazará de muerte a Pedro Luis Malvido	N/A	40 minutes
December 17, 2012	076	Memo se enteró que el hijo de Fina es de Amado	N/A	39 minutes
December 18, 2012	077	Los negocios de Vado se fueron al suelo y quiere matar a Edmundo el esposo de Rosario	N/A	37 minutes
December 19, 2012	078	Los Rey	N/A	40 minutes
December 20, 2012	079	Mani se enterará de los negocios chuecos de Vado y que perdió sus propiedades	N/A	38 minutes
December 21, 2012	080	Los Rey	N/A	40 minutes
December 24, 2012	081	El Chino no piensa pedirle nada a Los Rey para la recuperación de Quino y piensa boxear	N/A	40 minutes
December 25, 2012	082	Aurora intenta ingresar a las cuentas de su padre y Carmen le dice que la ayudará	N/A	41 minutes
December 26, 2012	083	Los Rey	N/A	38 minutes
December 27, 2012	084	Rosario se va para siempre con su hija	N/A	39 minutes
December 28, 2012	085	Fina recibe una terrible noticia, Quino murió en accidente automovilístico	N/A	36 minutes
December 31, 2012	086	Sepultan a Quino y Fina decide no casarse con nadie	N/A	38 minutes
January 1, 2013	087	Los Rey	N/A	39 minutes
January 2, 2013	088	Ismael quiere hundir a toda costa a Vado por lo que le hizo	N/A	37 minutes
January 3, 2013	089	Aurora intentó quitarse la vida	N/A	39 minutes
January 4, 2013	090	¿Matías y Lorenza se despiden para siempre?	5.5	39 minutes
January 7, 2013	091	El Chino le dice a Lorenza que no necesita su apoyo	5.5	39 minutes
January 8, 2013	092	Paola está en peligro por culpa de Ismael	5.9	39 minutes
January 9, 2013	093	Matías le pidió a Lorenza que se fueran juntos para siempre	5.9	38 minutes
January 10, 2013	094	Matías se sintió devastado por la respuesta de Lorenza	6.1	38 minutes
January 11, 2013	095	Lorenza y Matías harán su vida separada	6.0	38 minutes
January 14, 2013	096	Aurora amenaza a Carmen porque sabe que ella es la ladrona	5.9	39 minutes
January 15, 2013	097	Everardo entregó la cabeza del Ronco a Pedro Luis Malvido	5.8	39 minutes
January 16, 2013	098	Pedro Malvido tiene pocos días de vida	6.1	37 minutes
January 17, 2013	099	El Ronco Abadí está muerto y está en manos de Pedro Luis	5.8	38 minutes
January 18, 2013	100	Paola le confiesa a Ismael que tiene cáncer y está muriendo	5.7	38 minutes
January 21, 2013	101	Pedro Luis no sabe su aceptar la propuesta de Vado de meter a la cárcel a Matías	6.2	37 minutes
January 22, 2013	102	Matías besó a Rosario para demostrarle que no siente nada por ella	6.3	39 minutes
January 23, 2013	103	Aurora está herida y Padro Luis no parará ante nadie	6.7	38 minutes
January 24, 2013	104	Vado no descansará hasta destruir a su propia familia	6.1	39 minutes
January 25, 2013	105	Vado prefiere la muerte a ir a la cárcel	5.4	38 minutes
January 28, 2013	106	Matías habla con Paola sobre los momentos que están por venir	5.5	40 minutes
January 29, 2013	107	Pedro Malvido ha muerto, qué pasará con la venganza que no termina entre las dos familias	5.7	40 minutes
January 30, 2013	108	Manuela hará todo para liberar a Everardo de la cárcelA	6.6	39 minutes
January 31, 2013	109	Manuela no permitirá que su familia se destruya	N/A	38 minutes
February 1, 2013	110	Vado no piensa defender a su padre aunque la esté pasando mal	N/A	38 minutes
February 4, 2013	111	Aurora no se detendrá ante nadie en las últimas semanas de Los Rey	N/A	37 minutes
February 5, 2013	112	Los Rey	N/A	37 minutes
February 6, 2013	113	Pedro Luis está atrapado por Vado y tendrá que hacer lo que le pida	N/A	37 minutes
February 7, 2013	114	Aurora se pone como loca por la pérdida de su bebé	5.9	37 minutes
February 8, 2013	115	Ismael salvará la vida de Don Everardo	6.4	35 minutes
February 11, 2013	116	Rosario podría slirse con la suya, pero ¿Matías se quedará con ella?	6.4	35 minutes
February 12, 2013	117	Guillermo detuvo a Vado cuando intentaba matar a Aurora	5.8	34 minutes
February 13, 2013	118	Anaya se delatará mediate una grabación y Vado caerá en la trampa	6.1	35 minutes
February 14, 2013	119	Julia y Fina hacen su sueño realidad	6.1	37 minutes
February 15, 2013	120	Julia y Fina hacen su sueño realidad	6.2	35 minutes
February 18, 2013	121	¿Vado se saldrá con la suya?	N/A	39 minutes
February 19, 2013	122	Vado podría estar en peligro	5.9	35 minutes
February 20, 2013	123	Lorenza le reclama a Matías su burla y él la besa en el encuentro	6.2	38 minutes
February 21, 2013	124	El Chino ganará su pelea en el regreso al ring, qué viene después	N/A	38 minutes
February 22, 2013	125	Matías y Lorenza por fin serán felices para siempre	6.6	37 minutes
