= Anette Michel =

Mexican actress and model (born 1971)

- Born: Anette Michel Carrillo; June 30, 1971 (age 53); Guadalajara, Jalisco
- Occupations: Actress; model
- Spouse: Gregorio Jimenez

Anette Michel Carrillo (Spanish pronunciation: [aˈnet miˈtʃel] (born June 30, 1971 in Guadalajara, Jalisco) is a Mexican actress and model.

== Biography ==
Michel started out her career as a model at a young age.

She was born in Guadalajara. She modeled suits in order to help in her house expenditures. In interviews for magazines she has said her father died during her childhood and thus her relatives had to help out financially with her schooling. That is also the reason she started to work in modeling so young. She then moved to Mexico City where she got the opportunity of working for the famous model agency Contempo. Through this agency, Anette got the opportunity of hosting a TV program called Hollywood DF.

In 1996, Anette was offered a role in the telenovela Al Norte del Corazon for TV Azteca. She rejected the proposal, fearing of being typecast for the role she was offered. Some time later she received a proposal to work in the same telenovela, but this time as the protagonist, Ángela Medina, costarring with her ex-husband, Jorge Luis Pila.

In 1997, Anette was offered, and accepted, to star in the play Que lio con las petacas. In July 1998, she and Alan Tacher started co-hosting the TV program Tempranito, which airs on weekends. That same year, Anette was invited to Paris to model for fashion designer Armando Maffud.

In January 1999, Anette left Tempranito in order to act again. This time her co-star was Héctor Soberón in the telenovela Marea Brava, which was filmed in Puerto Vallarta, Jalisco. When the production of the telenovela was over, Anette went back to Mexico City to look for new work proposals. One of them was to co-host for the second time Tempranito, and on October 2, 1999, Anette resumed her participation in the program.

In February 2001, Anette started the recordings for the telenovela Cuando seas mía costarring Silvia Navarro and Sergio Basañez. 2012 she is recording the telenovela La Mujer De Judas in TV Azteca

== Filmography ==
=== Films ===
| Year | Title | Role | Notes |
|---|---|---|---|
| 2023 | Hasta la madre del Día de las Madres | Esmeralda | |

=== Television ===
| Year | Title | Role | Notes |
|---|---|---|---|
| 1997 | Al norte del corazón | Ángela Medina | |
| 1999 | Marea brava | Alejandra Hidalgo | |
| 2001–02 | Cuando seas mía | Bárbara Castrejón de Sánchez Serrano | |
| 2003–04 | Mirada de mujer, el regreso | Caridad | |
| 2005 | La otra mitad del sol | Mariana Robledo | |
| 2007-08 | Se busca un hombre | Ángela Medina | |
| 2009–10 | Pasión morena | Emilia Dumore / Casandra Rodríguez | |
| 2012 | La mujer de Judas | Altagracia del Toro | |
| 2013 | Secretos de familia | Cecilia Ventura | |
| 2015–20 | MasterChef México | Herself | Host |
| 2015 | UEPA! Un escenario para amar | Lourdes' mother | |
| 2016–17 | MasterChef Junior México | Herself | Host |
| 2016 | Hasta que te conocí | Ofelia de Puentes | |
| 2017–18 | 3 familias | Carolina | |
| 2021–22 | Contigo sí | Mirta Morán | |
| 2023 | Amores que engañan | Mirna | Episode: "Amor compartido" |
| 2023 | Minas de pasión | Roberta Castro de Villamizar | |
