= List of Prohibido amar episodes =

Prohibido Amar (Forbidden Love, Official release: Forbidden Passion) is a Mexican telenovela produced by Azteca in 2013. It is a remake of Colombian telenovela, La Sombra del Deseo. Soundtrack principal de la telenovela interpretado por Myriam Montemayor. On 7 October 2013, Azteca started broadcasting Prohibido Amar weeknights at 8:30pm, replacing Secretos de Familia. The last episode was broadcast on 7 February 2014, with Siempre Tuya Acapulco replacing it the following week.

== Episodes ==
Air Date	Number	Episode Title	Rating	Duration
October 7, 2013	001	Revive el primer capítulo de esta gran historia protagonizada por Rossana Nájera y Marco de Paula	6.4	54 minutes
October 8, 2013	002	Ignacio quiere ver a Rafael lejos de Gabriela	6.2	51 minutes
October 9, 2013	003	Ignacio está desaparecido y su familia piensa que es culpa de Gabriela	5.9	45 minutes
October 10, 2013	004	Gabriela está aterrada con la idea de la muerte de Ignacio y lo que pasará con la herencia	5.5	46 minutes
October 11, 2013	005	Gabriela no sólo se enfrenta a la muerte de Ignacio, sino al encuentro con su hermana	5.5	46 minutes
October 14, 2013	006	Rafael le brinda todo su apoyo a Gabriela en los momentos difíciles	5.1	42 minutes
October 15, 2013	007	Gabriela se sorprende al ver que Rafael es heredero de Ignacio	6.1	42 minutes
October 16, 2013	008	Ignacio está vivo, pero no puede recordar quién es, ni moverse	5.3	42 minutes
October 17, 2013	009	Rafael comenzará a investigar el origen de su relación con Ignacio y su madre	5.6	42 minutes
October 18, 2013	010	Salomón no tiene idea de que Gabriela no caerá en sus mentiras del fraude	5.4	43 minutes
October 21, 2013	011	Gabriela no venderá sus acciones a Salomón pese a su infamia del fraude	5.2	42 minutes
October 22, 2013	012	Laura siente celos de ver llegar a Rafael con Gabriela	5.8	42 minutes
October 23, 2013	013	Gabriela quiere saber cuándo y cómo Ignacio les vendió parte de sus acciones a Rafael y Alicia	6.7	42 minutes
October 24, 2013	014	Laura le prohibe a Rafael hablar con sus hijos	5.2	42 minutes
October 25, 2013	015	Laura hace todo para que Rafael se arrepienta de haberla dejado	5.8	42 minutes
October 28, 2013	016	Gabriela tiene las pruebas para que no puedan destruirla	5.8	42 minutes
October 29, 2013	017	Laura no tiene piedad e insulta a Rafael por las fotografías en el periódico	5.1	41 minutes
October 30, 2013	018	Gabriela hará que arresten a Víctor Suárez por el accidente de Marcos	6.6	42 minutes
October 31, 2013	019	Gabriela está muy molesta porque Rafael no fue honesto con ella	5.4	41 minutes
November 1, 2013	020	Gabriela no perdona los engaños, y siente que Rafael le mintió	4.7	41 minutes
November 4, 2013	021	Rafael y Gabriela no pueden ocultar lo que sienten el uno por el otro	5.0	41 minutes
November 5, 2013	022	Olga quiere meter a su padre a la casa de Gabriela mientras ella no está	6.5	41 minutes
November 6, 2013	023	Gabriela y Rafael despiertan juntos, mientras Laura no puede ocultar los celos	5.6	40 minutes
November 7, 2013	024	Rafael tiene miedo de enamorarse más de Gabriela por romper los corazones de sus hijos	5.8	41 minutes
November 8, 2013	025	Rafael sabe que perderá a su familia por el amor que siente por Gabriela	5.4	40 minutes
November 11, 2013	026	Laura escucha que Rafael está enamorado de Gabriela y que pasó la noche con ella	4.9	42 minutes
November 12, 2013	027	Gabriela le da la oportunidad a Rosario de que su hijo sea reconocido como de Ignacio	4.9	41 minutes
November 13, 2013	028	Laura descubre el secreto de Alicia e Ignacio	5.6	41 minutes
November 14, 2013	029	Laura no permitirá que Rafael se vaya de su lado	5.3	40 minutes
November 15, 2013	030	Gabriela verá a Rafael con su familia y Alicia logrará su cometido	5.3	41 minutes
November 18, 2013	031	Gabriela le pide a Rafael que no la lastime y se aleje de ella	5.3	41 minutes
November 19, 2013	032	Ignacio regresará a su vida y buscará a Gabriela	6.0	40 minutes
November 20, 2013	033	Salomón le pide a Alicia sus acciones para aliarse con Gabriela	5.0	41 minutes
November 21, 2013	034	Rafael y Grabriela se entregaron al amor que sienten el uno por el otro	5.3	39 minutes
November 22, 2013	035	Rafael y Gabriela sellarán su amor	5.5	40 minutes
November 25, 2013	036	Ignacio sabrá quién es y pensará que su familia nunca lo buscó	5.7	40 minutes
November 26, 2013	037	¿Gabriela y Laura tendrán una plática sobre Rafael?	5.7	39 minutes
November 27, 2013	038	Laura le dirá a Rafael que su mamá tuvo una relación de años con Ignacio Aguilera	5.3	41 minutes
November 28, 2013	039	Ignacio se comunicó con Gabriela pero no pudo decirle que era él	5.3	40 minutes
November 29, 2013	040	Rafael no quiere ver nunca más a Gabriela, por no perder el amor de sus hijos	5.1	40 minutes
December 2, 2013	041	Laura le pide más dinero a Rafael para poder darle el divorcio	5.1	41 minutes
December 3, 2013	042	Rafael acepta las condiciones de de Laura para divorciarse de ella	4.9	41 minutes
December 4, 2013	043	Ignacio regresa a su casa y ve a Gabriela con Rafael	4.7	40 minutes
December 5, 2013	044	Tatiana sufrió algo que la marcará toda la vida	5.3	41 minutes
December 6, 2013	045	Ignacio quiere demostrar que el hijo de Rosario es de él	5.5	40 minutes
December 9, 2013	046	Ignacio rescató a Gabriela antes de pisar la cárcel	5.5	41 minutes
December 10, 2013	047	Ignacio advierte que salvar a Gabriela es sólo el comienzo de su plan	5.3	40 minutes
December 11, 2013	048	Gabriela siente que Ignacio está vivo y quiere verlo	5.0	40 minutes
December 12, 2013	049	Gabriela es despojada de su casa por Alicia	5.1	40 minutes
December 13, 2013	050	Guillermo sabe que Rafael es su medio hermano	5.4	40 minutes
December 16, 2013	051	Ignacio regresa a casa a Olga y Gabriela por fin se ve con él frente a frente	5.7	41 minutes
December 17, 2013	052	Lorena acepta hacer negocios con Alicia por lográr más poder	5.6	40 minutes
December 18, 2013	053	Vienen más problemas para Salomón ahora que Ignacio está de regreso	5.0	40 minutes
December 19, 2013	054	Ignacio quiere hacer entender a Salomón que los negocios entre ellos pueden ser limpios	5.1	39 minutes
December 20, 2013	055	Marco termina su relación con Lorena y se refugia en los brazos de Laura	5.6	41 minutes
December 23, 2013	056	Lorena se encuentra a Ignacio y no puede creer que esté vivo	4.8	39 minutes
December 24, 2013	057	Salomón amenazó a Ignacio porque comenzará una guerra entre ellos	3.3	40 minutes
December 25, 2013	058	Ignacio le pide a Gabriela olvidar lo pasado y volver a intentarlo	4.7	41 minutes
December 26, 2013	059	Salomón está detrás del fraude, que según él, cometió Gabriela	5.6	40 minutes
December 27, 2013	060	Gabriela quiere que Ignacio sepa que está enamorada de Rafael	6.0	41 minutes
December 30, 2013	061	Salomón se burla abiertamente de Ignacio y Tatiana siente celos de su madre	N/A	39 minutes
December 31, 2013	062	Ignacio le dice a Rafael el por qué no puede estar con Gabriela	4.2	40 minutes
January 1, 2014	063	Rafael sabe que Ignacio es su verdadero padre y Gabriela no podrá estar con él	4.7	41 minutes
January 2, 2014	064	Rafael se debate entre la vida y la muerte, mientras que Gabriela no puede estar con él	5.3	37 minutes
January 3, 2014	065	Alicia se venga de Ignacio por el error que cometió, llevándose a su hijo	5.6	40 minutes
January 6, 2014	066	Alicia le cobra a Iganacio lo que hizo con Rafael de la manera más ruin	5.1	37 minutes
January 7, 2014	067	Lorena encontró a una gran aliada para no tener su merecido	5.6	41 minutes
January 8, 2014	068	Gabriela vuelve a prisión por culpa de Salomón y Alicia	6.5	41 minutes
January 9, 2014	069	Lorena le ofrece ayuda a Gabriela ahora que está en la cárcel	5.5	42 minutes
January 10, 2014	070	Lorena sigue con sus planes con Salomón para terminar con Gabriela	5.6	41 minutes
January 13, 2014	071	Laura hace todo por reconquistar a Rafael, y él la rechaza	6.0	41 minutes
January 14, 2014	072	Alicia está atrapada y puede ir a la cárcel, eso si Salomón no la ayuda	6.1	39 minutes
January 15, 2014	073	Olga tiene un pretendiente, pero lo rechaza	5.9	41 minutes
January 16, 2014	074	Alicia está segura que su denuncia la rompió Salomón y Félix le dice que se equivoca	5.2	41 minutes
January 17, 2014	075	La historia de loa Aguilera comienza a descubrirse	6.4	41 minutes
January 20, 2014	076	Los recuerdos vuelven al presente de los Aguilera	5.8	41 minutes
January 21, 2014	077	Rafael le pregunta a Laura si sale con Marco el maestro de su hija Tatiana	5.1	41 minutes
January 22, 2014	078	Ignacio busca todas las pruebas para refundir a Alicia y a Salomón en la cárcel	5.2	40 minutes
January 23, 2014	079	Ignacio podría curarse del cáncer que padece, si vuelve a tomar medicina alterna	5.8	41 minutes
January 24, 2014	080	Ignacio conoce a sus nietos y la pasa increíble con ellos	6.2	39 minutes
January 27, 2014	081	Rafael enfrenta a Alicia para que saque a Gabriela de la cárcel	6.0	41 minutes
January 28, 2014	082	Rafael cree que Gabriela tiene un novio, porque el la cárcel se lo dicen	5.7	40 minutes
January 29, 2014	083	Lorena podrá ir a prisión por los manejos en la empresa de los Aguilera	6.1	40 minutes
January 30, 2014	084	Ignacio le pide perdón a Alicia por todo el daño que le ha hecho	5.8	42 minutes
January 31, 2014	085	Gabriela tiene que decidir si perdonará a Rafael después de su abandono	5.9	41 minutes
February 3, 2014	086	Alicia caerá bajo arresto por el robo y secuestro de un menor	6.3	44 minutes
February 4, 2014	087	Salomón está atrapado en sus propias mentiras	6.2	42 minutes
February 5, 2014	088	Laura y Marco se casaron y ella le agradece a toda su familia	6.8	41 minutes
February 6, 2014	089	Gabriela no puede darle su corazón a Juan, porque aún ama a Rafael	6.8	42 minutes
February 7, 2014	090	¡Gracias por ser parte de esta gran telenovela!	6.8	43 minutes
