= Sergio Basáñez =

Mexican actor (born 1970)

- Born: Sergio Manuel Basañez Rodríguez; May 4, 1970 (age 56); Poza Rica, Veracruz, Mexico
- Occupation: Actor

Sergio Manuel Enrico Basáñez Rodríguez (Spanish pronunciation: [ˈseɾxjo βaˈsaɲes]; born May 4, 1970, in Poza Rica, Veracruz, Mexico) is a Mexican actor.

== Career ==
Sergio started his acting career at an early age. Before he got leading roles in soap operas, he made special appearances in them, while he studied acting. Simultaneously, he also studied law and became a lawyer.

At the age 22, Basañez got his first leading role in the Televisa soap opera Sueño de Amor (1992–1993). In 1994, he moved to Miami to star in the soap opera Morelia, and in 1995, he returned to Mexico to perform a special appearance in Marisol.

Then, in 1998, his last performances for Televisa were in La usurpadora and La Mentira, as he moved to TV Azteca, in 1999, where he got the leading role of Catalina y Sebastián, with Mexican actress Silvia Navarro, followed by La calle de las novias (2000), and Cuando seas mía (2001), for which he was awarded as the best actor in a leading role. This particular dramatic series was a remake of Café con Aroma de Mujer. Its original version was taped in Colombia.

In 2003, he starred in Un nuevo amor, with Vanessa Acosta, followed by La heredera. In 1997, he starred in the famous Mexican musical Aventurera, winning the Herald Award. In 2003, he starred in the stage play El Tenorio Cómico, for a long season.

Basañez has also performed in children's plays, such as: Pedro el Lobo, and La Bella Durmiente.

From 2005 to 2006, Basañez performed the leading role in the most successful soap opera broadcast by TV Azteca, Amor en custodia with leading lady Margarita Gralia, a famous actress from Argentina. He portrayed a tough, and at the same time tender bodyguard.

=== Television roles ===
Year	Title	Role	Notes
1989	Simplemente María	Jeane Claude Carre	
1990	Amor de nadie	Mario	
1993	Sueño de amor	Mauricio	
1994–1997	Mujer, casos de la vida real	Various roles	3 episodes
1995	Morelia	Luis Campos Miranda	
1996	Marisol	Mario Suárez	137 episodes
1997	María Isabel	Gabriel	20 episodes
1998	La mentira	Juan Fernández-Negrete	100 episodes
1999	Catalina y Sebastián	Sebastián Mendoza	120 episodes
2000	La calle de las novias	Enrique	125 episodes
2001	Cuando seas mía	Diego Sanchez-Serrano	
2001	Lo que callamos las mujeres	Adrián	Episode: "Mamá dos veces"
2003	Un nuevo amor	Santiago Mendoza	85 episodes
2003	Mirada de mujer, el regreso	Leonardo	1 episode
2004	La heredera	Antonio	
2005–2006	Amor en custodia	Juan Manuel Aguirre	234 episodes
2008	Secretos del alma	Leonardo Santiesteban	
2011	A corazón abierto	Andrés Guerra	
2012	Los Rey	Ronco Abadí	
2013	Secretos de familia	Maximiliano Miranda	105 episodes
2016	Un día cualquiera	Clemente	Episode: "Transgénero"
2016–2017	El Chema	Tobías Clark	75 episodes
2017	Nada personal	Lucas Herrera	
2018–2019	Por amar sin ley	Gustavo Soto	
2021	¿Qué le pasa a mi familia?	Porfirio Reiner Springer	
2021	La desalmada	German Gallardo Urdina	
2022	La herencia	Dante	

== External links and sources ==
- Sergio Basáñez at IMDb
