= Secretos de familia =

Secretos de familia (Family Secrets) may refer to:

- Secretos de familia (Mexican TV series), 2013
- Secretos de familia (Chilean TV series), 2024
