= La suerte de Loli =

American telenovela

- Genre: Telenovela; Comedy drama
- Created by: Lorena Miraglia; María José Riera
- Written by: Ricardo Álvarez; Amaris Páez
- Directed by: Miguel Varoni; Ricardo Schwarz; Danny Gavidia; Alfredo Hueck
- Starring: Silvia Navarro; Osvaldo Benavides; Gaby Espino
- Theme music composer: Elik Álvarez; Juan Cammarano
- Opening theme: "La suerte de Loli" by Juan Carlos Rodríguez & Miguel Ángel Ferrer
- Country of origin: United States
- Original language: Spanish
- No. of seasons: 1
- No. of episodes: 103

Production
- Executive producers: Karen Barroeta; Marcos Santana
- Producer: Elizabeth Suárez
- Editor: Ellery Albarran
- Production company: Telemundo Global Studios

Original release
- Network: Telemundo
- Release: 26 January – 21 June 2021

La suerte de Loli (English title: Loli's Luck) is an American telenovela that aired on Telemundo from 26 January 2021 to 21 June 2021. Silvia Navarro stars as the titular character. Production of the series began in September 2020.

== Plot ==
Loli Aguilar is an independent and successful woman who works as the executive producer of Global Radio Group, the number one radio station in the West Coast of the United States. While Loli's career is on the rise, her love life goes into the background as she enjoys her freedom and life without compromises. However, her life takes an unexpected turn when Mariana, her best friend, passes away and leaves everything to Loli, including her two children. The news leaves everyone surprised especially Loli, who feels like the least indicated person for that responsibility. Loli will have to face her new reality and learn that work is not everything in life, and discover that the true meaning of success is family and love.

== Cast ==
An extensive cast list was published on 15 October 2020 in a press release.

=== Main ===
- Silvia Navarro as Dolores "Loli" Aguilar
- Osvaldo Benavides as Rafael Contreras
- Gaby Espino as Paulina Castro
- Carlos Ponce as Armando
- Mariana Seoane as Melissa
- Joaquín Ferreira as Octavio
- Rodrigo Vidal as Bruno Torres
- Rosa María Bianchi as Norita
- Christian Chávez as Matías
- Alejandro López as Vicente Varela
- Dalexa Meneses as Samantha "Sam" Torres
- Marielena Davila as Jessica Contreras
- Andrés Cotrino as Gabriel
- Liz Dieppa as Carol Torres
- Diego Escalona as Nicolás "Nicky" Torres
- Amaranta Ruiz as Guadalupe
- Gisella Aboumrad as Rox
- Javier Díaz Dueñas
- Polo Monárrez as Apolo
- Vince Miranda as Arturo
- Karla Monroig as Rebeca
- Roberto Escobar as Rogelio
- Mika Kubo as Angie
- Fernando Carrera as Marcelino
- Maite Embil as Bertha Morales
- Ricardo Kleinbaum as Licenciado Ferrer
- Jeimy Osorio as Karen
- Jesús Moré as Salvador

=== Recurring ===
- Cesar Rodriguez as Leonardo
- Martha Mijares as Selma
- Laura Garrido as Gema
- Xavier Ruvalcaba as Joaquin
- Wendy Regalado as Dulce
- Jairo Calero as Jack
- George Akram as David
- Rafael Pedroza as Artemio
- Eduardo Serrano as Alonso
- Anna Silvetti as Veronica

=== Guest stars ===
- Jacqueline Bracamontes as Mariana
- Paulina Rubio as herself
- Lupillo Rivera as himself
- Luis Coronel as himself
- Alan Ramírez as himself
- Oswaldo Silvas as himself
- Manuel Turizo as himself
- Alberto Cortez as himself

== Episodes ==
No.	Title	Original release date	U.S. viewers (millions)
1	"Golpe bajo"	26 January 2021	1.50
2	"Sorpresa"	27 January 2021	1.25
3	"La esposa"	28 January 2021	1.25
4	"Error imperdonable"	29 January 2021	1.14
5	"La llamada"	1 February 2021	1.13
6	"Corazonada"	2 February 2021	1.17
7	"El donante de esperma"	3 February 2021	1.05
8	"Atrapados"	4 February 2021	1.04
9	"Celos"	5 February 2021	1.05
10	"Mensaje al corazón"	8 February 2021	1.14
11	"Bienvenido papá"	9 February 2021	1.06
12	"Un día de playa"	10 February 2021	1.14
13	"Revancha calculada"	11 February 2021	1.06
14	"Un salvavidas para Loli"	12 February 2021	1.08
15	"La nueva vicepresidenta"	15 February 2021	1.07
16	"Cambio de escenario"	16 February 2021	1.10
17	"Octavio lanza una bomba"	17 February 2021	1.00
18	"Reuniendo pistas"	18 February 2021	0.92
19	"La infiel"	19 February 2021	1.10
20	"Reacción inesperada"	22 February 2021	1.05
21	"Al descubierto"	23 February 2021	1.07
22	"Cada vez más cerca"	24 February 2021	1.21
23	"Pasión desenfrenada"	25 February 2021	1.02
24	"Amor clandestino"	26 February 2021	1.10
25	"Expuestos"	1 March 2021	1.06
26	"Divide y vencerás"	2 March 2021	1.04
27	"Una sorpresa para Paulina"	3 March 2021	0.99
28	"En desacuerdo"	4 March 2021	1.03
29	"Secretos revelados"	5 March 2021	0.96
30	"Padre desesperado"	8 March 2021	1.09
31	"Autocontrol"	9 March 2021	1.03
32	"Desarmado"	10 March 2021	1.03
33	"Pasión a flor de piel"	11 March 2021	0.99
34	"Arrebato apasionado"	12 March 2021	0.92
35	"El misterio de la abuela"	15 March 2021	1.06
36	"Sorpresa inoportuna"	16 March 2021	1.22
37	"Evidencia irrefutable"	17 March 2021	1.23
38	"Adición al equipo"	18 March 2021	1.02
39	"Abandono sin perdón"	19 March 2021	1.20
40	"Vientos de cambio"	22 March 2021	1.10
41	"Nuevas experiencias"	23 March 2021	0.96
42	"Víctimas de un alucinógeno"	24 March 2021	1.03
43	"Tras las rejas"	25 March 2021	0.94
44	"Paulina está en problemas"	26 March 2021	1.00
45	"Noche de apuestas"	29 March 2021	1.00
46	"El renegado"	30 March 2021	1.09
47	"Sin arrepentimiento"	31 March 2021	0.92
48	"Desde el corazón"	1 April 2021	1.04
49	"Que mujerón"	2 April 2021	0.76
50	"La traición"	5 April 2021	0.96
51	"Planes alterados"	6 April 2021	0.99
52	"Cercanía peligrosa"	7 April 2021	0.93
53	"Propuesta de adopción"	8 April 2021	0.93
54	"Decepcionado"	9 April 2021	0.87
55	"Juego sucio"	12 April 2021	1.06
56	"Peligro latente"	13 April 2021	1.04
57	"Un lunar como pista"	14 April 2021	1.08
58	"Todo sea por Sam"	16 April 2021	1.07
59	"Bajo hipnosis"	19 April 2021	1.05
60	"Actitud incontrolable"	20 April 2021	1.11
61	"Inversionista al descubierto"	21 April 2021	0.96
62	"Lo que quiero"	22 April 2021	0.97
63	"Aquí está pasando algo"	23 April 2021	1.10
64	"Vivir engañada"	26 April 2021	1.11
65	"Hermanitos"	27 April 2021	0.95
66	"Hoyo en uno"	29 April 2021	0.96
67	"Noticias de infarto"	30 April 2021	0.89
68	"¿Inocente?"	3 May 2021	1.03
69	"Peligro latente"	4 May 2021	0.89
70	"Revancha consumada"	5 May 2021	0.97
71	"Un dolor oculto"	6 May 2021	1.04
72	"Momento incómodo"	7 May 2021	0.85
73	"Una petición complicada"	10 May 2021	0.98
74	"Nicky, el héroe"	11 May 2021	0.99
75	"Contrademanda"	12 May 2021	0.99
76	"Tío interesado"	13 May 2021	1.03
77	"Magnetismo animal"	14 May 2021	0.94
78	"Vendiendo a Loli"	17 May 2021	0.88
79	"Cuestión de confianza"	18 May 2021	0.97
80	"Cambio de estrategia"	19 May 2021	1.00
81	"Asuntos ocultos"	20 May 2021	1.00
82	"La oferta está en la mesa"	21 May 2021	0.97
83	"Un golpe muy duro"	24 May 2021	1.05
84	"Amor espontáneo"	25 May 2021	1.03
85	"Lo mejor para todos"	26 May 2021	1.01
86	"Grave error"	27 May 2021	0.93
87	"Víbora"	28 May 2021	0.86
88	"Todo sigue en pie"	31 May 2021	0.94
89	"Indecisa"	1 June 2021	0.95
90	"La familia, lo más importante"	2 June 2021	0.93
91	"Perdóname, hermano"	3 June 2021	1.11
92	"Todo va a estar bien"	4 June 2021	0.93
93	"Un adiós forzado"	7 June 2021	0.98
94	"Porque lo mereces"	8 June 2021	1.12
95	"Retiro en solitario"	9 June 2021	1.13
96	"El regreso a Global Radio"	10 June 2021	1.06
97	"Paulina lanza una bomba"	11 June 2021	0.91
98	"Mujer apasionada"	14 June 2021	1.09
99	"Acercamiento infructuoso"	15 June 2021	1.02
100	"El corazón de Leo"	16 June 2021	1.02
101	"Sin escapatoria"	17 June 2021	1.02
102	"Tras Vicente"	18 June 2021	1.08
103	"Los "no esposos""	21 June 2021	1.23

== Reception ==
=== Ratings ===
Viewership and ratings per season of La suerte de Loli
Season	Timeslot (ET)	Episodes	First aired		Last aired		Avg. viewers (millions)
Season	Timeslot (ET)	Episodes	Date	Viewers (millions)	Date	Viewers (millions)	Avg. viewers (millions)
1	Mon–Fri 9:00 p.m.	103	26 January 2021	1.50	21 June 2021	1.23	1.03

=== Awards and nominations ===
Year	Award	Category	Nominated	Result	Ref
2021	Produ Awards	Best Telenovela	La suerte de Loli	Won	
2021	Produ Awards	Best Creativity in Production Covid-19	La suerte de Loli	Won	
2021	Produ Awards	Best Directing - Superseries or Telenovela	Miguel Varoni, Danny Gavidia and Ricardo Schwarz	Won	
2021	Produ Awards	Best Producer - Superseries or Telenovela	Marcos Santana, Karen Barroeta and Elizabeth Suárez	Nominated	
2021	Produ Awards	Best Lead Actor - Superseries or Telenovela	Osvaldo Benavides	Won	
2021	Produ Awards	Best Lead Actress - Superseries or Telenovela	Silvia Navarro	Nominated	
2021	Produ Awards	Best Supporting Actress - Superseries or Telenovela	Gisella Aboumrad	Nominated	
2021	Produ Awards	Grand Prize for Fiction	La suerte de Loli	Won	
2022	International Emmy Award	Best Non-English Language U.S. Primetime Program	La suerte de Loli	Nominated	
