= Víctor González (actor) =

Mexican actor (born 1973)

- Born: Víctor Manuel González Reynoso; September 10, 1973 (age 52); Querétaro, Qro., Mexico
- Occupations: Actor, model

Víctor Manuel González Reynoso (Spanish pronunciation: [ˈbiɣtoɾ ɣonˈsales]; born September 10, 1973, in Querétaro) is a Mexican actor. He is the nephew of the well-known composer Oscar Reynoso.

== Filmography ==
=== Film ===
Year	Title	Role
2000	El precio de nuestra sangre	Emilio
2020	El club de los idealistas	Gabriel

=== Television ===
Year	Title	Role	Notes
1997	Pueblo chico, infierno grande	Raul	
1997	Mirada de mujer	Fernando	
1998	Perla	Hugo	
1998	Azul Tequila	Arcadio Berriozabal	
1999	Marea brava	Paulo	
1999	Besos prohibidos	Carlos	
2000	El amor no es como lo pintan	Alberto Miranda	
2001	Lo que es el amor	Pablo Rivas	
2002	El Pais de las Mujeres	Daniel Cano	
2002	La duda	Julian	
2003	Amor descarado	Ignacio Valdez	
2005	El Amor No Tiene Precio	Marcelo Carvajal	
2007	Trópico	Antonio Guzman	
2007	Bajo las riendas del amor	Victor	
2008	Alma indomable	Nicanor Sanchez	
2009	Pasión morena	Leo Hernandez/Fernando Sirenio	
2010	Entre el Amor y el Deseo	Luis Carlos Marquez	
2012	La Mujer de Judas	Salomon Salvatierra	
2013	Hombre tenías que ser	Román Ortega/Román Lara Martí	
2016	La candidata	Gerardo Martinez	
2017	Muy padres	Emilio Palacios Fernández	
2019	Soltero con hijas	Antonio Paz	Guest star
2020	Quererlo todo	Leonel Montes	
2022	Los ricos también lloran	León Alfaro	
2023	El amor invencible	Calixto	
2024	El Conde: Amor y honor	Ricardo Sánchez	
2025	A.mar, donde el amor teje sus redes	Sergio	
2026	Guardián de mi vida	Victorio Kuri	
