= Ninel Conde =

Mexican singer and actress

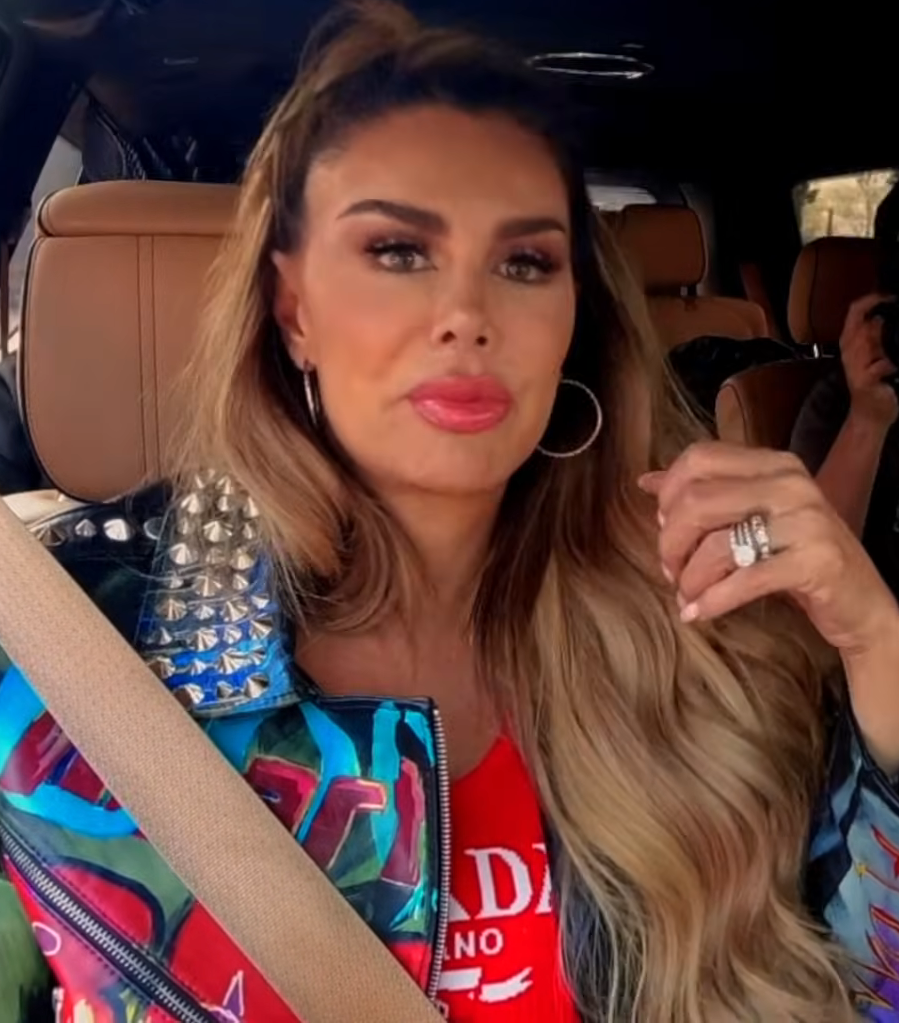
- Conde in 2025
- Born: Ninel Herrera Conde; Toluca, Mexico
- Occupations: Singer; actress; model; television personality
- Years active: 1995–present
- Spouses: Ari Telch (m. 1996; div. 1998) Juan Zepeda (m. 2007; div. 2013) Larry Ramos (m. 2020)
- Partners: José Manuel Figueroa (2002–2006); Giovanni Medina (2013–2017)
- Children: 2
- Musical career
- Genres: Regional Mexican; Latin pop; cumbia
- Instrument: Vocals
- Labels: Universal Records – Universal Latin (2003–2008); EMI (2006)
- Website: ninel-conde.com.mx

Ninel Herrera Conde is a Mexican singer, actress, model and television host known for her performances in Rebelde, Fuego en la sangre, Mar de amor and Porque el amor manda, among others.

== Career ==
Her first record production was titled Ninel Conde (2003), which contains the song "Callados", played a duet with singer José Manuel Figueroa. This material was nominated for a Latin Grammy in 2004 for "Mejor álbum grupero."

In 2004, Conde participated in the third edition of the reality show Big Brother VIP and was voted-off after 43 days of confinement. In October 2004, she began acting on Rebelde, produced by Pedro Damián. Her most remarkable role so far has been this one. Her role as Alma Rey in Rebelde (2004–2006) expanded her career to Chile, Romania, Colombia, Brazil, Peru, Spain and Croatia. This show was nominated for the awards TVyNovelas 2006 as "Best Lead Actress." She was aLao involved in the films 7 mujeres, un homosexual y Carlos and Mujeres infieles 2.

In 2005 she released her second album La Rebelde from which emerge the songs "Todo conmigo", "Ingrato", "Que no te asombre", and "Tú". Conde began appearing on the American dramedy series Ugly Betty where she portrays an actress on a "faux" telenovela that is seen by the main character's family. She also participated in contest reality show titled El Show de los Sueños, alongside Pee Wee, Kalimba Marichal, Gloria Trevi, DJ Flex/Nigga, Mariana Seoane, and Priscila.

In 2008, Conde played the character Rosario Montes in Fuego en la sangre alongside Adela Noriega and Eduardo Yañez, where she was nominated by the participating TVyNovelas Award as "Best actress co-star."

In August 2009, she was confirmed to appear in the Mexican telenovela Mar de amor as Coral (main-villain of the story), the telenovela was produced by Natalie Lartilleux. This show was nominated for "Best Actress antagonistic." In 2012, Conde participated in the soap opera Porque el amor manda as Discua Paz De La Soledad.

In September 2013, Conde becomes a judge on the fourth season of Univision's dancing competition Mira quién baila.

On June 16, 2025, Colombian singer Karol G released the trailer for her Tropicoqueta album, inspired by Mexican Telenovelas, where Conde reprised her role as Alma Rey from Rebelde, along with fellow Mexican actresses Anahí and Itatí Cantoral.

She was cast for the third season of reality show La casa de los famosos México, set to premiere on 27 July 2025, by Las Estrellas and Canal 5.

== Personal life ==
From 1996 to 1998, she was married to Mexican actor Ari Telch. She and Telch have one daughter together: Sofía (born May 7, 1997). On December 7, 2007, Conde married her second husband, businessman Juan Zepeda. The couple separated in August 2013. It was reported in 2015 that the marriage to Zepeda was invalid as he was already married to María Sol Corral from Ecuador. It was reported in October 2013 that Conde was dating businessman Giovanni Medina. In April 2014, Conde announced that she and Medina were expecting a baby boy. On October 21, 2014, she gave birth to their son Emmanuel. Ninel Conde married her third husband Larry Ramos on October 28, 2020. Ninel Conde sued Anabel Hernández for moral damage, after Hernández published in a book that Conde had been in a relationship with the Mexican drug trafficker Arturo Beltrán Leyva, who died in 2009. Conde lost the lawsuit in 2024.

== Filmography ==
=== Television ===
Television
Year	Title	Role	Notes
1995	Al derecho y al Derbez	Modelo	TV-Series, season 1, episode 4, uncredited
1995	Bajo un mismo rostro	Mujer	Telenovela, special appearance
1996	Luz Clarita	Elsa Cárdenas	Telenovela, special appearance
1998	Perla		Telenovela, special appearance
1999	Catalina y Sebastián	Paty	Telenovela, supporting role
1999	Besos prohibidos	Karen	Telenovela, supporting role
2000	La Revancha	Reina Azcárraga	Telenovela, supporting role
2001	Lo que callamos las mujeres		TV-Series, episode: "Una rebanada de pastel"
2001–02	Como en el cine	Topacio "La Matadora"	Telenovela, main antagonist
2004	La escuelita VIP	Ninel	TV-Series
2004	La hora pico	Various Characters	TV-Series
2004–06	Rebelde	Alma Rey	Telenovela, protagonist
2006	Ugly Betty	Sexy Woman	TV-Series, episode: "Four Thanksgivings and a Funeral" episode: "After Hours" episode: " Queens for a Day"
2008	Fuego en la sangre	Rosario Montes	Telenovela, co-protagonist
2009	Desmadruga2	Various	TV-Series
2009–10	Mar de amor	Catalina Mijares "Coral"	Telenovela, main antagonist
2012–13	Porque el amor manda	Discua Paz de la Soledad de Cervantes / Lucía Montemayor	Telenovela, supporting role
2013	Nueva vida		TV-Series, episode: "Gran final"
2017	En tierras salvajes	Carolina Tinoco Cruz	Telenovela, co-protagonist
2018–20	El Señor de los Cielos	María de los Ángeles "Evelina" López	Telenovela, main role (seasons 6–7)
2023	Secretos de las Indomables	Herself	Reality, Main cast
2025	Tropicoqueta	Alma Rey	Album trailer, main cast
2025	La casa de los famosos México	Herself	Reality, main cast (season 3)
2026	Top Chef VIP	Herself	Reality, main cast (season 5)

== Discography ==
=== Studio albums ===
Year	Album details	Peak
Year	Album details	MEX
2003	Ninel Conde: Release date: September 16, 2003; Label: Universal Latin	3
2005	La Rebelde: Release date: October 25, 2005; Label: Universal Latin	5
2011	Ayer y Hoy: Release date: June 21, 2011; Label: EMI Music	12

=== Compilation albums ===
Year	Album details	Peak
Year	Album details	MEX
2005	Y... Ganó El Amor: Release date: April 26, 2005; Label: Universal Latin	–
2008	20 Grandes de Ninel Conde: Release date: June 26, 2008; Label: Universal Latin	–

=== EPs ===
Year	Album details	Peak
Year	Album details	MEX
2006	El Bombón Asesino: Release date: July 20, 2006; Label: EMI	2
2011	Hoy Tengo Ganas De Ti: Release date: May 10, 2011; Label: EMI	8

=== Singles ===
Year	Single	Peak positions		from the Album
Year	Single	^{US LAT}	^{US REG}	from the Album
2003	"Callados" (with José Manuel Figueroa)	–	33	Ninel Conde
2004	"Canela fina"	–	–	Ninel Conde
2004	"La tabla"	–	–	Ninel Conde
2005	"La rebelde"	–	–	La Rebelde
2005	"Todo conmigo"	–	–	La Rebelde
2006	"Ingrato"	–	17	La Rebelde
2006	"No ne veras"	–	–	La Rebelde
2006	"El bombón asesino"	–	–	El Bombón Asesino
2008	"Ni un centavo"	–	–	Libre
2011	"Vivir así es morir de amor"	–	–	Ayer y Hoy
2011	"Hoy tengo ganas de ti"	–	18	Ayer y Hoy
2012	"Será porque te amo"	–	-	Ayer y Hoy

== Music videos ==
Year	Song	Album	Director	Notes
2003	"Callados" (with José Manuel Figueroa)	Ninel Conde	Rodrigo Guardiola	
2005	"Todo Conmigo"	La Rebelde		Filmed at Rancho de Vicente, also Jose Manuel Figueroa appears on the video as Ninel's love interest.
2005	"Ingrato"	La Rebelde		
2006	"El Bombón Asesino"	El Bombón Asesino		
2010	"Mujeriego"	Libre		Eduardo Yañez appears on the video.
2011	"Vivir Asi Es Morir De Amor"	Ayer Y Hoy	Simon Brand	

== Album appearances ==
Year	Song	Album
2004	"Una Mujer"	Big Brother VIP: 3 (soundtrack)
2007	"El Año Viejo"	Navidad Con Amigos: 2007
2008	"El Año Viejo"	Navidad Con Amigos: 2008
2008	"El cable y El bombón asesino"	Fuego en la sangre
