= Marco de Paula =

Spanish actor (born 1977)

- Born: 22 April 1977 (age 47); Sevilla, Andalucía, Spain

Marco de Paula (born 22 April 1977 in Sevilla) is a Spanish actor. He studied with Ofelia Angélica, Juan Carlos Corazza, Adam Black y Babdo Piernas. He has acted in theater, film and television, advertising has also participated in more than 40 campaigns. Theatrically a member of the theater group La Gaviota, having performed various works.

== Filmography ==
Television
Year	Title	Role	Notes
2000	Nada es para siempre	Alberto	8 episodes
2001	Arrayán		
2002-2003	20tantos	Isaías	4 episodes
2005-2007	Hospital Central	Dr. Roberto Cuevas	Main cast; 44 episodes
2007-2008	Planta 25	Miguel Valdemares / Miguel	Main cast; 64 episodes
2010	Valientes	Pablo Soto	
2011-2012	Esperanza del corazón	Leonardo	
2012	Rosa diamante	Gerardo Altamirano Jr. "Junior"	Co-lead role
2013	Nueva vida		"Linda" (Season 1, Episode 3)
2013	Prohibido amar	Rafael Hernández Cosio	Lead role
2016	Mujeres de negro	Sandro	
