= Por ti (Mexican TV series) =

2002 Mexican telenovela

- Developed by: TV Azteca
- Directed by: Carlos Ángel Guerra; Martín Barraza
- Starring: Leonardo García; Ana de la Reguera
- Opening theme: "Doy La Vida Por Un Beso" by Zezé di Camargo y Luciano "Y Llegaste Tú" by Andrés de León and Sin Bandera
- Country of origin: Mexico
- Original language: Spanish
- No. of episodes: 135

Production
- Executive producer: Rafael Gutiérrez
- Producer: Fides Velasco
- Running time: 45 minutes

Original release
- Network: Azteca Trece
- Release: April 15 – October 18, 2002

Related
- Cuando seas mía

Por Ti (transl. For You) is a Mexican telenovela produced by Fides Velasco and Rafael Gutiérrez for TV Azteca It was broadcast on Azteca Trece (now Azteca Uno) from Monday April 15, 2002 to Friday October 18, 2002 for 135 episodes. It starred Leonardo García and Ana de la Reguera as protagonists.

== Cast ==
=== Main protagonists ===
Leonardo Garcia
Ana de la Reguera

=== Special participation ===
Francisco de la O

=== Special appearance ===
Angelica Aragon

=== Leading actors ===
Luis Felipe Tovar
and Regina Torne
with Fernando Becerril as Arturo
Lolo Navarro as Tomasa
and Claudia Islas as Virginia
Season 2
Alvaro Guerrero

=== Other actors ===
Gloria Peralta
Rodrigo Cachero
Andrea Noli
Gabriel Porras
Vanessa Ciangherotti
Xavier Massimi
Tamara Monsserat
Mariana Torres
Season 2 onwards
Fabian Corres
Ana la Salvia
Alejandra Ley
Yul Bürkle
Mariana Isla
Luis Arrieta

=== Infant talent ===
Carlos Hays
Sugey

=== Special guest stars ===
Hector Arredondo
Jorge Carles
and Rafael Sanchez Navarro

=== Cast trivia ===
In 2004, a number of actors of this series reappeared in TV Azteca's Belinda which stars Mariana Torres and Leonardo Garcia as main protagonists. The other actors included: Rodrigo Cachero, Luis Arrieta, Tamara Monserrat, Regina Torne and others.

In the same year also, some actors reappeared in TV Azteca's La Heredera. They are Andrea Noli, Fabian Corres, Hector Arredondo and others.

In 2006, Carlos Hays, Alvaro Guerrero, and Luis Felipe Tovar appeared in Montecrsto with Silvia Navarro as heroine.

== Theme song ==
=== Doy La Vida Por Un Beso ===
Singers

- Zezé di Camargo & Luciano

Writers

- Cecilio Nena
- Antonio Luiz
- Lalo Prado

Adaptation

- Manny Benito

Editor

- Warner Chapel

=== Y Llegaste Tú ===
Season 3 onwards

- Performed by:
  Andrés de León and Sin Bandera
- Written by:
  Leonel García
  Noel Schajris
