= Catalina y Sebastián =

1999 Mexican telenovela

- Created by: Ranferi Negrete
- Developed by: TV Azteca for Azteca Digital
- Directed by: Antulio Jimenez Pons
- Starring: Silvia Navarro; Sergio Basañez
- Opening theme: "No Pedir Perdon" Performed by Ana Gabriel
- Country of origin: Mexico
- Original language: Spanish
- No. of episodes: 120

Production
- Executive producer: Antulio Jimenez Pons
- Producer: Antulio Jimenez Pons
- Production location: Mexico City
- Camera setup: Multi-camera
- Running time: 42 minutes

Original release
- Network: Azteca 13
- Release: May 3 – October 15, 1999

Related
- Cuando seas mía La heredera

Catalina y Sebastian is a Mexican telenovela produced by TV Azteca and it was the first series for Silvia Navarro and Sergio Basañez as co-protagonists. The series was then developed into another Mexican telenovela by the title of Contrato de amor which starring Leonardo García and Ximena Rubio.

== Cast ==
- Silvia Navarro as Catalina
- Sergio Basañez as Sebastian
- Sergio Kleiner as Gustavo Negrete
- Claudia Islas as Adela
- Regina Torné as Antonieta
- Alberto Mayagoitia as Carmelo "El Capataz"
- Antonio De Carlo as Padre Jerónimo
- Jorge Luis Pila as Antonio
- María Rebeca as Emilia
- Christian Cataldi as Eduardo
- Pilar Souza as Josefa
- Fidel Garriga as Don Lupe Mendoza
- Lili Blanco as Alicia
- Kenia Gazcon as Silvia
- Lissette Salazar as Jéssica
- Eduardo Schillinsky as Ricardo
- Hugo Ateo as Macario
- Géraldine Bazán as Luisa Negrete
- Araceli Chavira as Petra
- Ninel Conde as Paty
- Patricia Conde
- Alejandra Lazcano as Martina Mendoza
- Alma Martínez
- Ranferi Negrete
- Ramiro Orci
- César Riveros

== Theme Song ==
Title: "No Pedir Perdon" Singer: Ana Gabriel
