= La calle de las novias =

Mexican telenovela

- Created by: Alberto Barrera
- Developed by: Zuba Producciones and TV Azteca for Azteca Digital
- Directed by: Jaime Humberto Hermosillo; Heriberto Lopez de Anda; Carlos Angel Guerra
- Starring: Silvia Navarro; Juan Manuel Bernal; Sergio Basañez; Omar Fierro
- Opening theme: "Perdoname Todo" Performed by Amaury Gutiérrez "A Puro Dolor"Performed by Son by Four
- Country of origin: Mexico
- Original language: Spanish

Production
- Producers: Christian Bach; Humberto Zurita; Gerardo Zurita
- Production location: Mexico City
- Editor: Monica Rodriguez Carrillo
- Camera setup: Multi-camera
- Running time: 42 minutes

Original release
- Network: Azteca 13
- Release: 2000

La calle de las novias (Bride's Avenue) is a Mexican telenovela produced by TV Azteca and Zuba Producciones. Directed by Jaime Humberto Hermosillo, it stars Silvia Navarro and Juan Manuel Bernal as protagonists.

== Cast ==
- Silvia Navarro - Aura Sánchez
- Juan Manuel Bernal - Román Mendoza
- Sergio Basañez - Enrique
- Omar Fierro - Manuel Ortega
- Julieta Egurrola - Diana de Mendoza
- Arcelia Ramírez - Emilia Mendoza
- Margarita Sanz - Ernestina de Sánchez
- Sergio Bustamante - Luis Cardozo
- Fabiola Campomanes - María Sánchez
- Lola Merino - Lisette
- Guillermo Gil - Padre Tomás
- Rafael Cortés - Augusto Mendoza
- Víctor Huggo Martin - Gabriel Sánchez
- Bruno Bichir - Sergio
- Josafat Luna - Cuco
- Laura Padilla - Matilde
- Edith Kleiman - Marcela
- Tońo Valdéz - Ramiro
- Tania Arredondo - Monica

== International broadcasters ==
=== North America ===
- USA: Telemundo

=== South America ===
- Argentina:
- Paraguay:
- Ecuador:
