= Perla (TV series) =

1998-1999 Mexican telenovela

- Created by: Enrique Torres
- Developed by: TV Azteca for Azteca Digital
- Directed by: Antulio Jimenez Pons
- Starring: Silvia Navarro; Leonardo Garcia
- Opening theme: "Prohibido" performed by Octavio Cruz
- Country of origin: Mexico
- Original language: Spanish
- No. of episodes: 230

Production
- Executive producer: José Ambris
- Producers: Juan David Burns; Elisa Salinas
- Production location: Mexico City
- Camera setup: Multi-camera
- Running time: 42 minutes

Original release
- Network: Azteca Trece
- Release: March 2, 1998 – January 15, 1999

Perla is a Mexican telenovela produced by Juan David Burns, Elisa Salinas and José Ambris for TV Azteca, It was broadcast on Azteca Trece (now Azteca Uno) form Monday March 2, 1998 to Friday January 15, 1999 for 230 episodes. It stars Silvia Navarro and Leonardo Garcia in the lead roles.

== Plot ==
In the world of power and money, no errors are permitted. Perla is a youth attending a prestigious college; she was sent there by her mother at a very young age and has never met her father. There, she meets and befriends Julieta Santiago, the heir of "Juvenile", a major cosmetics company in Mexico. Julieta loves and has a son with Roberto Valderrama, who nevertheless betrays her and abandons her while she is pregnant. After some time, Julieta dies in a car accident. Perla decides to take her place in the Santiago family.

== Cast ==
=== Main cast ===
- Silvia Navarro as Perla / Julieta Santiago
- Leonardo Garcia as Luis Roberto Valderrama

=== Secondary cast ===
- Gina Romand as Mercedes (villain)
- Andrés García Jr. as Alberto "Junior" Valderrama
- Paloma Woolrich as Eugenia Martinez Kaufman (villain)
- Jorge Lavat as César
- Rodolfo Arias as Pablo (main villain)
- Roberto Medina as Octavio (main villain)
- Irma Infante as Patricia
- Miguel Couturier as Alberto
- Mauricio Ferrari as Enrique
- Vanessa Acosta as Gina Valderrama
- Carmen Areu as Otilia Santiago
- Rodrigo Cachero as Alexis Santiago
- José Ramón Escoriza as Felipe Legarreta (villain)
- Karla Llanos as Julieta Santiago Sanchez
- Cristina Alatorre as Jazmín (villain, turns good)
- Gerardo Acuña as Bernardo
- Simone Victoria as Toña
- Víctor González as Hugo
- Eugenio Montessoro as Julio Alcántara
- Lucía Muñoz as Adriana
- Gabriela Hassel as Rosenda Santiago (villain)

=== Tertiary cast ===
- Michelle Barquín as Enfermera
- Roberto Carrera as Hector
- Ninel Conde
- Martín Cuburu as Benares
- Carlos Alejandro Diaz as Raymundo
- Adriana Doblado as Belén Sanchez
- Cynthia Ele as María
- Elena Felgueres as Adriana
- Daniela Garmendia as Josefina
- Javier Guerrero as Médico
- Dieter Koll as Marco
- Miguel Manzano Jr. as Germán
- Socorro Miranda as Mónica
- Betty Monroe as Guadalupe "Lupita"
- Deborah Moralo as Secretaria
- Sergio Mayer Mori as Neonato
- Eduardo Muñoz as Enriquito
- Mariana Peñalva as Regina
- Flavio Peniche as Evaro
- Palmira Pérez as Mariana
- María Rebeca as Matilde (main villain)
- Ana María Rebell as Rosa
- Karla Rico as Recepcionista
- Isabela Ripol as Julietita Santiago
- Maribel Rodríguez as Cristina
- Cuba Sanchez as Jurista
- Maricarmen Sandoval

== Theme song ==
- Title: "Prohibido"
- Performed by: Octavio Cruz
