= Mario San Román =

Mario San Román (born 1959 in Mexico City, Mexico). In July 2004, he was appointed chief executive officer of TV Azteca (one of the world's two largest producers of Spanish-language television programming), succeeding Pedro Padilla. Mr. San Román joined TV Azteca in 1998 as head of the Azteca 13 Network.

He was soon responsible for all of the company's distribution channels, before being appointed COO in October 2002.

San Román graduated in Communications and Marketing Research from the Universidad Iberoamericana, and holds further degrees from the Stanford School of Business and Ashridge School of Business in London and the IPADE.
