= Prohibido amar =

Mexican telenovela

- Genre: Telenovela
- Created by: Luis Felipe Salamanca; Dago García; Mauricio Barreto
- Written by: Carmen Madrid; María Renée Prudencio; Ximena Escalante
- Directed by: Mauricio Meneses; Pablo Gómez Sáenz
- Starring: Rossana Najera; Fernando Ciangherotti; Anna Ciocchetti; Iliana Fox; Ari Telch; Marco de Paula
- Opening theme: "Prohibido Amar" by Myriam Montemayor
- Country of origin: Mexico
- Original language: Spanish
- No. of episodes: 90 (list of episodes)

Production
- Executive producer: Rafael Urióstegui
- Producer: Ximena Cantuarias
- Production locations: Mexico City, Mexico
- Camera setup: Multi-camera
- Running time: 35–65 minutes
- Production company: Azteca

Original release
- Network: Azteca Trece
- Release: 7 October 2013 – 7 February 2014

Related
- Secretos de Familia; Siempre Tuya Acapulco

Prohibido Amar (Forbidden Love, Official release: Forbidden Passion) is a Mexican telenovela produced by Azteca in 2013. It is a remake of Colombian telenovela, La Sombra del Deseo. Soundtrack principal de la telenovela interpretado por Myriam Montemayor. On 7 October 2013, Azteca started broadcasting Prohibido Amar weeknights at 8:30pm, replacing Secretos de Familia. The last episode was broadcast on 7 February 2014, with Siempre Tuya Acapulco replacing it the following week.

== Cast ==
Actor (s)	Character
Rossana Najera	Gabriela Ramírez
Fernando Ciangherotti	Ignacio Aguilera Olivares
Anna Ciocchetti	Alicia Cosío
Iliana Fox	Laura Saldivar de Hernández
Marco de Paula	Rafael Hernández Cosio
Ari Telch	Salomón Aguilera
Andrea Martí	Olga Ramírez
María José Magan	Rosario Sandoval
Claudia Lobo	Cecilia Romero
Eduardo Arroyuelo	Guillermo Aguilera
Cinthia Vazquez	Nina Hernández Cosío
Emilio Guerrero	León Ramírez
Juan Martín Jauregui	Marcos Roldán
Hector Kotsifakis	Manuel Morales
Keyla Wood	Chivis
Hernán Mendoza	Félix
Fabián Corres	Mauricio
Giovanna Romo	Andrea
