= Rossana Nájera =

Mexican actress of soap operas (born 1980)

Rossana Nájera Flores
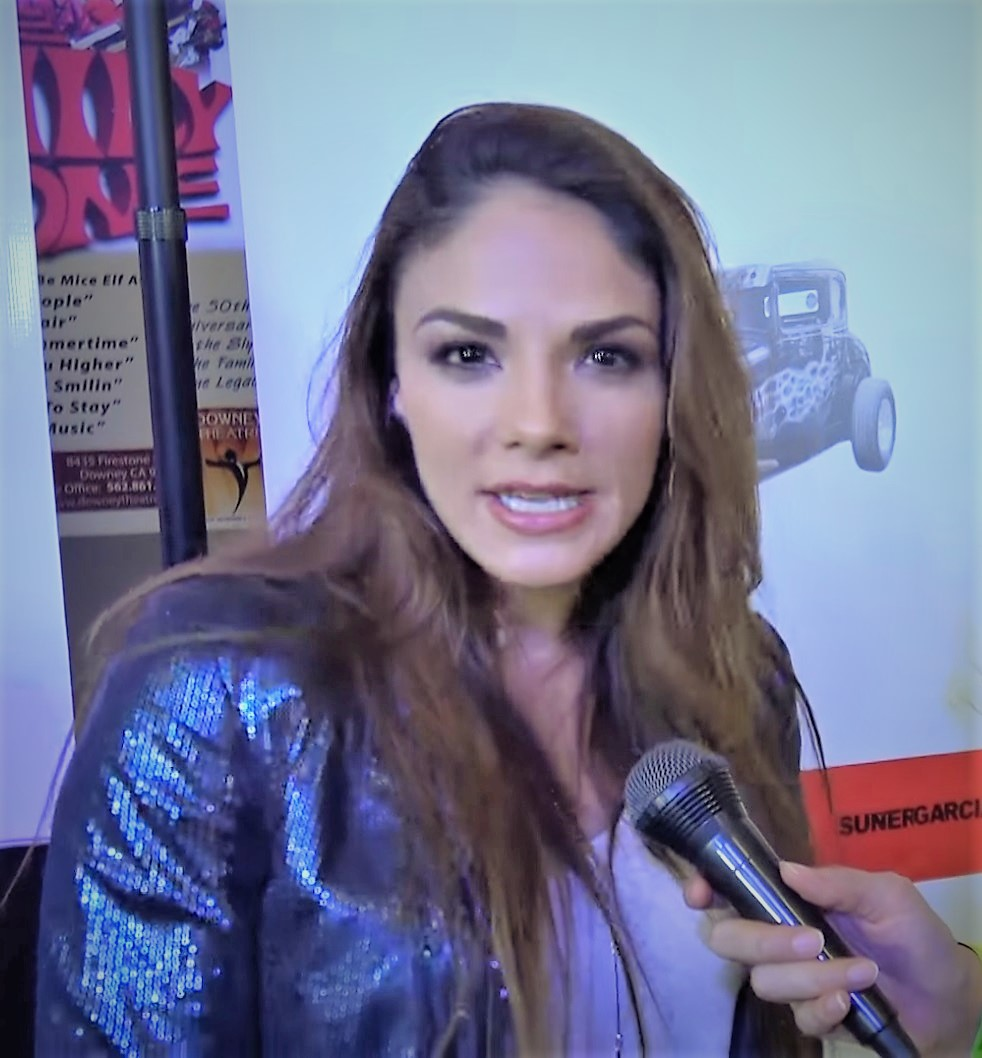
- Rossana Nájera interviewed by Dulce Osuna in 2017
- Born: February 14, 1980 (age 46); Mexico

Rossana Nájera Flores (born February 14, 1980, in Xalapa, Veracruz) is a Mexican actress of soap operas. She studied acting in Centro de Formacion Actoral of TV Azteca.

== Filmography ==
Television roles
Year	Title	Roles	Notes
2006	Amor sin condiciones	Andrea	
2007	Se busca un hombre	Lilí Olivares	
2010	La Loba	Yolanda "Yoli" Contreras	
2012	Los Rey	Lorenza Malvido	Main role; 125 episodes
2013	Prohibido amar	Gabriela Ramírez	Main role; 90 episodes
2015	Tanto amor	Oriana Roldán	Series regular; 119 episodes
2016	El Chema	Auristela Durán	Recurring role; 4 episodes
2018	Tenías que ser tú	Amaranta Sarquís	Series regular
2023	Eternamente amándonos	Erika Maldonado	Series regular
2025	Cautiva por amor	Mariángeles	
2026	Hermanas, un amor compartido	Lía Montalvo Fernández	Series regular
