= Silvia Navarro =

Mexican actress (born 1978)

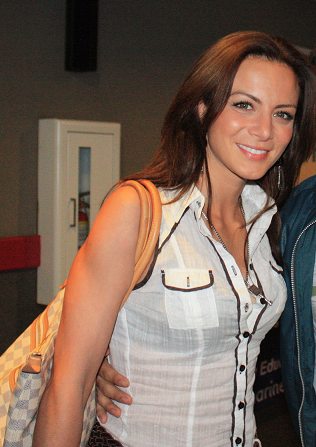
- Navarro in 2010
- Born: Silvia Angélica Navarro Barba; September 14, 1978 (age 47); Irapuato, Guanajuato, Mexico
- Occupation: Actress
- Years active: 1997–present
- Partner: Gerardo Casanova (2012–2020)
- Children: 1

Silvia Angélica Navarro Barba (born September 14, 1978) is a Mexican actress. She made her acting debut in 1997, playing the lead role in the telenovela Perla. Since then, she has continued to work for the Mexican television network TV Azteca, and later for Televisa and Telemundo.

== Biography ==
Navarro was born on September 14, 1978, in Irapuato, Guanajuato. She attended and graduated from "Centro de Estudios y Formación" (CEFAC), TV Azteca's acting school in Mexico City. She studied under instructors such as Raul Quintanilla and Héctor Mendoza.

In 2012, Navarro confirmed that she was in a relationship with Gerardo Casanova. On February 17, 2015, she confirmed her pregnancy and later revealed that the baby was a boy. On September 7, 2015, she announced that she had given birth to her first son, León. In an Instagram live in 2020, she revealed that she was no longer in a romantic relationship with her son's father.

== Career ==
Navarro's career began when she was still a baby, appearing in ads for different brands. As a child, she did casting for children's telenovela Carrusel and got a role, but had to quit to go live with her father in another city. At age 18, Navarro was the host of a game show called A la cachi, cachi porra, broadcast by Canal Once.

In 1998, she auditioned for Azteca's telenovela Perla, and unexpectedly, was cast in the leading role. After that she continued to appear in Azteca's telenovelas in a leading roles such as: Catalina y Sebastián, La calle de las novias, Cuando seas mía, La duda and La heredera.

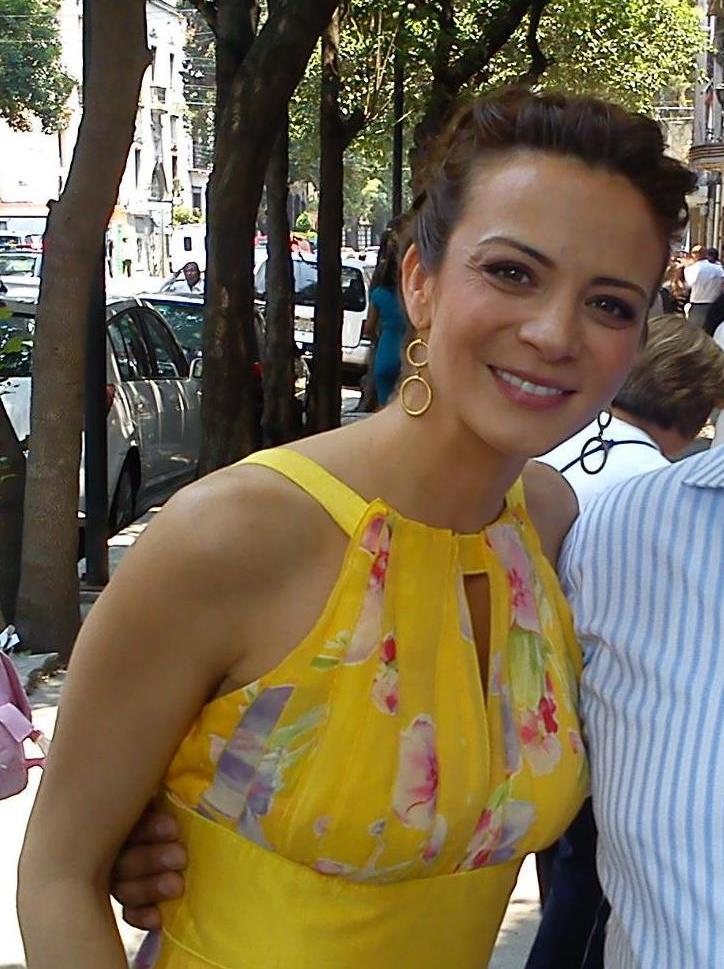
Navarro in Mexico City in 2013

In 2007, after three years of absence from telenovelas, Navarro returns to Azteca to star in Montecristo. The same year, she joined the cast of the play Chicas católicas, which tell the story of several girls between age 6 and 12, who begin to discover the life, and starred in the film Amor letra por letra alongside Plutarco Haza.

In 2008, after 10 years, Navarro left Azteca and joined Televisa. On August 23, 2008, Navarro joined the cast of Mañana es para siempre, a production by Nicandro Díaz González, alongside Fernando Colunga and Lucero. It became the most successful telenovela in the United States, where it was followed by more than six million viewers.

In 2009 she participated in the play Todos eran mis hijos and in the films Cabeza de Buda and Asesino serial.

In 2010, Navarro appeared in Cuando me enamoro, produced by Carlos Moreno, again achieving success in the ratings. In addition, she opened her first restaurant, 'Sabor Amor'. In 2014, three years later, she closed it due to low revenue.

In 2011, Navarro starred in the comedy film Labios rojos, alongside Jorge Salinas, where she plays a woman who seeks by all means the solution to the sexual problems she has with her husband.

She returned to the small screen in 2012, starring in Amor bravío, produced by Carlos Moreno, and gave life to 'Camila', a strong woman who after a great tragedy seeks her life and destiny in the Hacienda 'La Malquerida'. Two years later, Navarro starred in the comedy Mi corazón es tuyo, a production of Juan Osorio, alongside Jorge Salinas and Mayrín Villanueva.

On July 12, 2016, Navarro starred in the telenovela, La candidata, produced by Giselle González. She continued to collaborate with González in her next telenovela Caer en tentación.

On October 15, 2020, Navarro confirmed she would be portray the titular character, Loli Aguilar in La suerte de Loli. This was her first time working for TV network Telemundo and her first production in the United States. The series premiered in January 2021.

== Filmography ==
Television
Year	Title	Role	Notes
1998-1999	Perla	Perla Altamirano Espinoza / Julieta Santiago	Main role
1999	Catalina y Sebastián	Catalina Negrete Rivadeneira	Main role
2000	La calle de las novias	Aura Sánchez Ruiz	Main role
2001–2002	Cuando seas mía	Teresa Suárez Domínguez "Paloma" / Elena Olivares Maldonado de Sánchez Serrano	Main role
2002	Cara o Cruz	Libra	
2002	Vivir así	Laura	
2002–2003	La duda	Victoria Altamirano Rojas	Main role
2004–2005	La heredera	María Claudia Madero Grimaldi	Main role
2006–2007	Montecristo	Laura Ledezma de Lombardo / Laura Sáenz Gutiérrez	Main role
2008–2009	Mañana es para siempre	Fernanda Elizalde Rivera	Main role
2010–2011	Cuando me enamoro	Renata Monterrubio Álvarez de Linares / Regina Gamba Soberón	Main role
2012	Amor bravío	Camila Monterde Santos	Main role
2014–2015	Mi corazón es tuyo	Ana Leal Fuentes	Main role
2016–2017	La candidata	Regina Bárcenas Ríos de San Román	Main role
2017–2018	Caer en tentación	Raquel Cohen Nasser de Becker	Main role
2021	La suerte de Loli	Dolores "Loli" Aguilar Balderas	Main role
2024	Tengo que morir todas las noches	Gloria Romero	Main role
2024	Juegos interrumpidos	Karen Villa	Main role
2026	Guardián de mi vida	Sofía Peralta-Avitia Villaseñor	Main role
2026	My Daughter's Father	Macarena	Main role

Film and theater
Year	Title	Role	Notes
2002	Robando el rock and roll		Short film
2005	Contracorriente	La Güera	Film
2005	Esperanza	Andrea	Film
2005	Mar Muerto	Maku	Theater
2005	El Tenorio cómico	Doña Inés	Theater
2005	Químicos para el amor	Larissa /Julia /Regina	Theater
2006	Dragones: destino de fuego	Marina (Voice)	Film
2007	Chicas católicas	Eva Durazo/Hermana Sacre Coeur	Theater
2008	Amor letra por letra	Hannah	Film
2009	Todos eran mis hijos	Ann Deever	Theater
2009	Cabeza de Buda	Magdalena	Film
2009	Asesino serial		Short film
2010	Te presento a Laura	Andrea	Film
2011	Sin Cura	Elena	Theater
2011	Labios Rojos	Blanca Caballeros	Film
2013	Locos de amor	May	Theater
2014	El Misantropo o el Violento Enamorado	Celimena	Theater
2014	La Dictadura Perfecta	Lucía Garza	Film
2015	Mi Corazon Es Tuyo	Ana Leal	Theater
2016	Finding Dory	Destiny	Latin Spanish dub (voice)
2017	Beauty and the Beast	Agathe/Enchantress, Narrator	Latin Spanish dub (voice)
2024	Intercambiadas	Paola	Film

== Awards and nominations ==
=== Premios Diosas de Plata ===
Year	Category	Film	Result
2009	Female Revelation	Amor letra por letra	Nominated
2015	Best supporting actress	La dictadura perfecta	Nominated

=== Premios People en Español ===
Year	Category	Telenovela	Result
2009	Best Couple with Fernando Colunga	Mañana es para siempre	Won
2009	Surprise of the Year	Mañana es para siempre	Won
2009	Best Actress	Mañana es para siempre	Nominated
2011	Best Actress	Cuando me enamoro	Nominated
2012	Best Actress	Amor Bravío	Nominated
2014	Best Actress	Mi corazón es tuyo	Won

- 2012: The magazine People en Español named her as one of "50 Most Beautiful".

=== Premios Juventud ===
Year	Category	Telenovela	Result
2013	¡Chica que me quita el sueño!	Amor bravío	Nominated
2015	Protagonista favorita	Mi corazón es tuyo	Won

=== Association of Theatre Journalists Awards ===
Year	Category	Theater	Result
2010	Best Actress	Todos eran mis hijos	Nominated

=== Association of Theatre Critics and Journalists Awards ===
Year	Category	Theater	Result
2010	Best Female Co-acting	Todos eran mis hijos	Won
2007	Actress Revelation	Mar muerto	Won

=== TV Adicto Golden Awards ===
Year	Category	Telenovela	Result
2013	Best Lead Actress	Amor Bravío	Won

=== Premios TVyNovelas ===
Year	Award	Category	Telenovela	Result
2013	Favoritos del Público	Favorite Couple	Amor Bravío	Nominated
2013	Favoritos del Público	Favorite Kiss	Amor Bravío	Nominated
2013	Favoritos del Público	Favorite Slap	Amor Bravío	Won
2015	Favoritos del Público	Favorite Couple	Mi corazón es tuyo	Nominated
2015	Favoritos del Público	Favorite Kiss	Mi corazón es tuyo	Nominated
2015	Favoritos del Público	Favorite Slap	Mi corazón es tuyo	Nominated
2017	Premios TVyNovelas	Best Actress	La candidata	Nominated
2018	Premios TVyNovelas	Best Actress	Caer en tentación	Nominated
