= Leonardo García =

Mexican actor

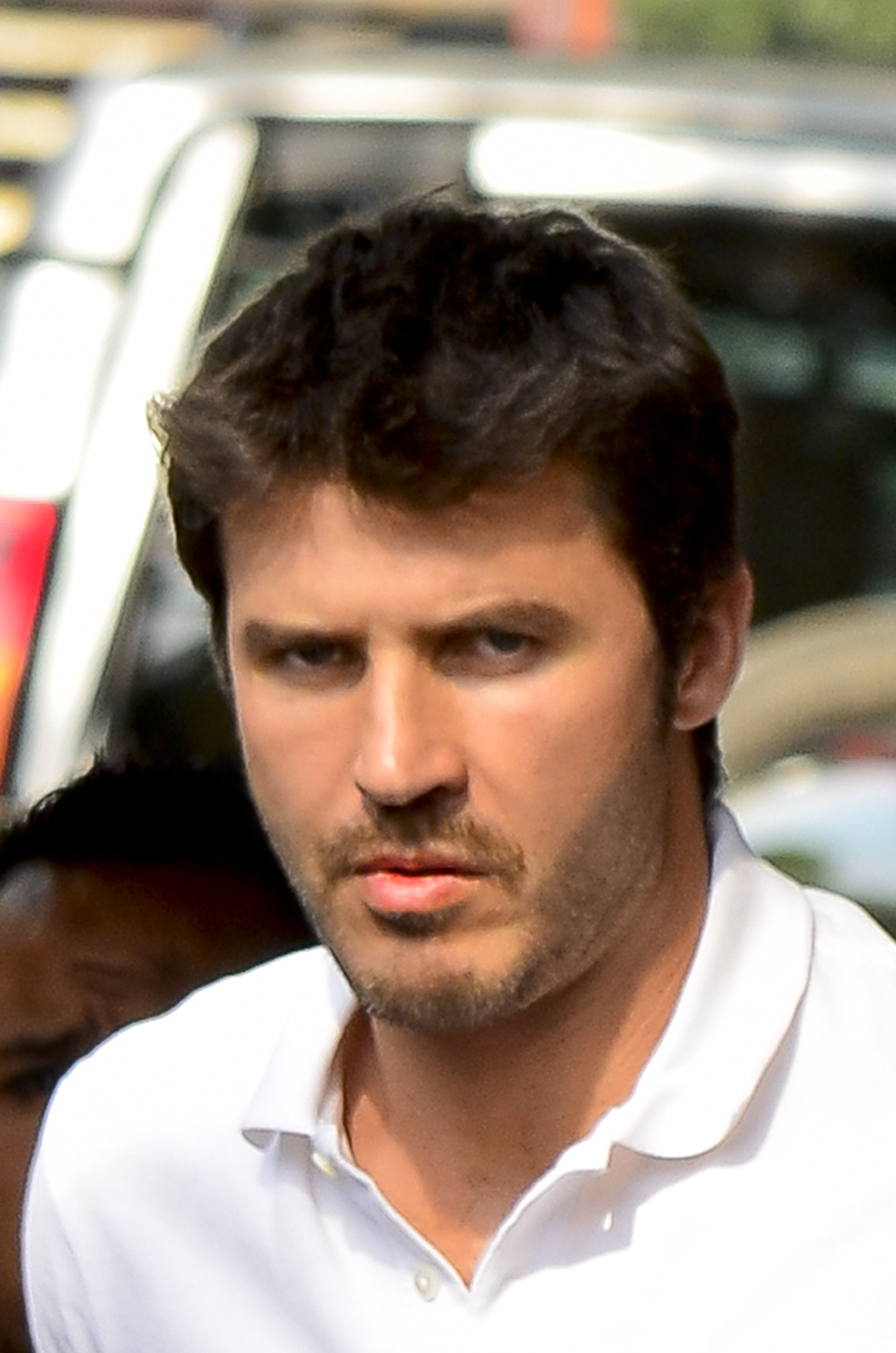
- Leonardo García
- Born: Leonardo García Vale; December 27, 1972 (age 53); Mexico City, Mexico
- Occupation: Actor

Leonardo García Vale (Spanish pronunciation: [leoˈnaɾðo ɣaɾˈsi.a]; born December 27, 1972, in Mexico City, Distrito Federal) is a Mexican actor.

== Filmography ==
=== Dubbing ===
Year	Title	Role	Notes
2006–2010	El Chavo Animado	Jaimito the Mailman	Portrayed by actor Raúl Padilla in the original El Chavo del Ocho series.

=== Films ===
Year	Title	Role	Notes
1983	El día del compadre		Film debut
1992	La tumba del Atlántico	Tommy Green	
1992	Perros de presa		
1992	Horas violentas	América	
1993	Bosque de muerte	Raúl	
1994	Dos hermanos buena onda		
1996	El amor de tu vida S.A.	Galan de Eugenia	
1997	Una luz en la oscuridad		
2007	El de la camisa negra		
2016	Mexiwood		Unknown

=== Television ===
Year	Title	Role	Notes
1989	Papá soltero		Episode: "Abuso de confianza"
1991	Un hombre en guerra	Joelito	Television film
1991–94	Tarzán	Carlos Mendosa	"Tarzan Tames the Bronx" (Season 1, Episode 3); "Tarzan and the Return of the Bronx" (Season 3, Episode 25)
1994	Prisionera de amor	Óscar	
1995	Con toda el alma	Luis Linares	
1997	Aguamarina	Diego Quintana	
1998	Perla	Luis Roberto Valderrama	
1999	Acapulco HEAT	Amelio	"Code Name: Phantom" (Season 1, Episode 17)
2000	Ellas, inocentes o culpables	Mario	
2001	Lo que callamos las mujeres	Alberto	"María" (Season 1, Episode 75)
2002	Por tí	Antonio Cortéz	Lead role
2002	Lo que es el amor	Román Castellanos	68 episodes
2004	Belinda	Ricardo Semprum	
2007	Se busca un hombre	Bruno Martel	
2008	Contrato de amor	Gabriel	
2011	A corazón abierto	Bruno Bautista	
2012	Los Rey	Everardo Rey San Vicente "Vado"	Co-lead role
2015–16	Tanto amor	Alberto Lombardo	Lead role
