= La duda =

- Created by: Jose Luis Duran
- Developed by: TV Azteca
- Directed by: Alicia Carvajal; Juan Ibanez
- Starring: Silvia Navarro; Víctor González; Omar Germenos
- Theme music composer: Chao lopez
- Opening theme: "La Duda" Performed by Yahir & Nadia
- Country of origin: Mexico
- Original language: Spanish
- No. of episodes: 110

Production
- Executive producer: Fides Velasco
- Producer: Elisa Salinas
- Production location: Mexico City
- Editors: Marco Ivan Gonzalez; Moroca
- Camera setup: Multi-camera
- Running time: 42 minutes

Original release
- Network: Azteca 13
- Release: 2002

La duda ('The Doubt') is a telenovela broadcast in Mexico by the TV Azteca network.

== Cast ==
- Silvia Navarro ... Victoria
- Víctor González Reynoso ... Julian
- Sergio Bustamante ... Adolfo
- Julieta Egurrola ... Teresa
- Omar Germenos ... Gabriel
- Leonardo Daniel ... Jorge
- Elizabeth Cervantes ... Valentina
- Marta Aura ... Azucena
- Pedro Sicard ... Arturo
- José Carlos Rodríguez ... Mario
- Adriana Parra ... Jacinta
- Alejandra Lazcano ... Graciela
- Martín Altomaro ... Luis
- Ana Laura Espinosa ... Romualda
- Ángeles Cruz ... Dominga
- Luisa Dander ... Tachita
- Marco Antonio Treviño ... Martín
- Socorro de la Campa ... Rosa
- Andrés Palacios ... Chimino
- Alberto Casanova ... Lencho
- Saby Kamalich ... Elvira
- Carolina Carvajal ... Carolina
- Arleta Jeziorska ... Florenza
- Alejandro Lukini ... Humberto
- Jesús Ochoa ... Santiago
- Fabiana Perzabal ... Karla
- Maribel Rodríguez ... Margarita
- María Rojo ... Amelia
- Daniela Spanic ... Blanca
