= Se Busca Un Hombre =

- Developed by: Emmanuel Dupret Geno
- Starring: Andrea Noli; Anette Michel; Vanessa Ciangherotti; Mariana Ochoa; Rossana Najera; Claudia Alvarez; Leonardo Garcia; Luis Miguel Lombana
- Opening theme: Anuncio Clasificado
- Country of origin: Mexico
- Original language: Spanish
- No. of episodes: 260

Production
- Executive producer: Genoveva Martínez
- Running time: 60 minutes

Original release
- Network: TV Azteca
- Release: February 12, 2007 – February 8, 2008

Se Busca un Hombre (Men Wanted) is a Spanish-language telenovela produced by Genoveva Martínez for TV Azteca. It stars Andrea Noli, Anette Michel, Vanessa Ciangherotti, and Claudia Álvarez.

== Plot ==
The main theme of the series tells the story about private lives of a group of women who are frequent clients of "Angelica Style", a prestigious beauty clinic. This group of women, Angelica, Nora, Mercedes, Samantha, Loreto, Vanesa, Lilí, Gabriela, Fernanda and Cecilia, has one thing in common: they have all failed to find the men of their dreams. As the stories blend, their different personalities are shown, and their deepest wishes are revealed. They want to find a man who can understand them with freedom and love.

== Cast ==
- Andrea Noli as Angelica
- Claudia Alvarez as Loreto
- Rodolfo Arias as Dario
- Aaron Baes as Rodrigo
- Rodrigo Cachero as Andres
- Vanessa Ciangherotti as Vanessa
- Augusto Di Paolo as Miguel Angel
- Angela Fuste as Mercedes
- Leonardo Garcia Vale as Bruno
- Miriam Higareda as Diana
- Sergio Kleiner as Pepe Alcantara
- Luis Miguel Lombana as Gonzalo
- Alejandro Lukini as Daniel
- Juan Pablo Medina as Armando
- Anette Michel as Nora
- Leon Michel as Fabian
- Rossana Najera as Lili
- Fernando Noriega as Ariel
- Jesus Ochoa as Tomas
- Mariana Ochoa as Samantha
- Cecilia Piñeiro as Leticia
- Cynthia Rodriguez as Fernanda
- Fernando Sarfatti as Jean Paul
- Omar Germenos as Emilio
- Patrick Fernandez as Paolo
