= La heredera (Mexican TV series) =

Mexican telenovela

- Created by: Julio Cesar Marmol; Henry Ramos; Martin Luna
- Developed by: TV Azteca
- Directed by: Jorge Rios Villanueva; Raul Quintanilla; Martin Barraza; Luis Manzo; Carlos Villegas
- Starring: Silvia Navarro; Sergio Basañez
- Theme music composer: Estefano & Julio Reyes
- Opening theme: "Ahora Quien" performed by Marc Anthony
- Country of origin: Mexico
- Original language: Spanish
- No. of episodes: 200

Production
- Executive producers: Gerardo Zurita; Jorge Rios Villanueva
- Producers: Henry Ramos; Martin Luna
- Production location: Mexico City
- Editor: Monica Rodriguez Carrillo
- Camera setup: Multi-camera
- Running time: 42 minutes

Original release
- Network: Azteca Trece
- Release: 2004 – 2005

Related
- Catalina y Sebastián; Cuando seas mía

La Heredera (The Heiress) is a Mexican telenovela produced by TV Azteca. It marked the third reunion for Silvia Navarro and Sergio Basañez as protagonists. The series was then developed into an American telenovela by the title of American Heiress.

== Plot ==
Meet Maria Claudia(Silvia Navarro). Her father, Don Julian (Guillermo Murray), is the most influential industrialist of the Mexican political scope. Lauro(Victor Huggo Martin), her older brother, incarnates the ambition, greed and resentment, which he uses like arms on his way to the political and economic power. Lorena (Aylin Mujica), her sister, is a talented and beautiful woman and at the same time suffering from culpability and addiction. Octavio(Xavier Massimi), her younger brother, is the minor of the family. Don Julian is on the verge of dying and Maria Claudia (who studies in the USA), returns urgently to Mexico; but on her way she gets in an accident and doesn't arrive. In the middle of her misfortunes, she meets Antonio (Sergio Basañez), an ex-soldier of the Gulf War, and they fall in love. Don Julian survives and the experience of being so close to death will unite more than ever the love of the father and his family. Maria Claudia and Antonio are meant for each other and try to build their happiness; but everything is destroyed with the appearance of Aranza, the woman who years back offered to Antonio something more than just a fleeting love.

== Cast ==
=== Main cast ===
Silvia Navarro ... María Claudia Madero Grimaldi
Sergio Basañez ... Antonio Bautista
Margarita Gralia ... Gabriela Grimaldi de Madero

=== Co-Protagonist ===
Aylín Mújica ... Lorena Madero Grimaldi

=== Prime actors ===
Guillermo Murray ... Don Julián Madero Grimaldi
Julieta Egurrola ... Dulce Sergio Torres

=== Protagonists ===
Víctor Huggo Martin ... Lauro Madero Grimaldi
Juan Manuel Bernal ... Dionisio
Bruno Bichir ... Santiago
Andrea Noli ... Kauris
Fabián Corres ... Salomon
Xavier Massimi ... Octavio Madero Grimaldi
Arturo Beristain ... Dr. Alvaro Dominguez

=== Special participations ===
Lourdes Villareal
Gabriela Canudas ... Aranza
Fidel Garriga
Enrique Munoz ... Niero
Adriana Louvier ... Linda
Mauricio Valle

=== Secondary casts ===
Josafat Luna
Christian Cataldi
Ángela Fuste ... Brenda
David Zepeda
Chucho Reyes
Arleta Jersioska
Maria Luisa Vazquez
Faisy
Carina Sarti
Larisa Mendizabal
Shirley
Ana Laura Espinosa ... Ponchita
Beatriz Cecilia
Ana Berumen
Juan Luis Orendain
Fernando Sarfatti
Angela Sanchez
Rocio Adame
Ruli Peterman
Hector Arredondo ... Joaquín Mercader
Luciana Silveyra
Luis Rabago ... Orlando Mondragon Season 2: Mercedes Pascual Rene Gatica Hernan Mendoza Miguel Rene Rene Campero

=== Infant talent ===
Carlos Padilla ... Ricardo
Aldo Sebastian de Diego ... Juancito

=== Special guest stars ===
Guest Stars in Pilot episode
Sergio Bustamante
Evangelina Elizondo
Margarita Sanz

=== Tertiary casts ===
Constantino Costas
Monica Escamilla ... News Presenter
Mariana Peñalva ... Nurse
Cynthia Hernandez
Gonzalo Vega
Alberto Zeni ... Beto
Jonathan Islas ... Emiliano

== Theme song ==
Title: "Ahora Quien"
Singer: Marc Anthony
Lyrics & Music: Estefano & Julio Reyes
Editor: World Deep Music Sony ATV Pub.
(BMI/BLUE Plantinum Pub. Sony ATV Pub. ASCAP)
Album: Amar Sin Mentiras

== Crew ==
Creator

- Marmol Ramos Luna

Writers

- Araceli Monsell
- Gerardo Sanchez Luna
- Jorge Patino
- Guadalupe Obon
- Luis Felipe Ybarra
- Ivan Arguello

Literary Editor

- Bethel Flores

literary counseling

- Luis Sierra Mercado

Image Designer

- Javier De la Rosa

Wardrobe

- Laura Simonin

Ambience

- Gerardo Hernandez

Hairstyles

- Carmen Retana

Make-up

- Alejandra Rodriguez

Props

- Guillermo Granados
- Ulises Granados

Cinematography Coordinator

- Francisco Garcia

Cinematography Designer

- Antonio Novaro

Music effects

- Juan Carlos Norona Miranda
- Carlos Adrian Norona
- Daniel Norona
- Guillermo Jacome
- Federico Sanchez

Location

- Carolina Villanueva

Planning

- Ricardo Ruiz

Production manager

- Pedro Luevano (Season 1)
- Jose Solano (Seasons 2 & 3)

Audio design

- Ignacio perez

Director of Artistic Talent

- Maria Luisa Anzaldua
- Maria Antonio Yanez

Editor

- Monica Rodriguez Carrillo

Casting

- Francisco Lugo

Art Director

- Jorge Vieira

Second unit Photography Director

- Manuel Palacios

Photography Director

- Jorge Medina

Associate Producer

- Martha Perez-Valdez

Director Assistant

- Gladis Genis
- Pedro Adame

Second unit Camera Director

- Alexis Canizo (Seasons 2 & 3)

Second unit director

- Carlos Villegas
- Martin Barraza (Seasons 2 & 3)

Scene Director

- Maestro Raul Quintanilla (Seasons 2 & 3)

General Director

- Luis Manzo (Season 1)
- Jorge Rios (Seasons 2 & 3)

Executive Producer

- Gerardo Zurita (Seasons 1 & 2)

General Producer

- Henry Ramos (Seasons 1 & 2)
- Gerardo Zurita (Season 3)

Director of Azteca Novelas

- Martin Luna
