= Secretos de familia (Mexican TV series) =

2013 Mexican telenovela

- Genre: Telenovela
- Created by: Alberto Barrera
- Based on: Brothers & Sisters by Jon Robin Baitz
- Written by: Anisbely Castillo
- Directed by: Julián Antuñano; Alberto Barrera; Raúl Quintanilla
- Creative director: Gloria Carrasco
- Starring: See list
- Theme music composer: Mauricio Albaroa; Descemer Bueno; Omar Hernández
- Opening theme: "En dónde está la vida" by Carolina Soto and Edú del Prado
- Ending theme: "Me estás removiendo el piso" by Omar Hernández
- Country of origin: Mexico
- Original language: Spanish
- No. of episodes: 105

Production
- Executive producers: Rita Fusaro; Pedro Luévano
- Producers: Raúl Quintanilla; Elisa Salinas; Pedro Lira
- Cinematography: Sergio Treviño
- Editor: Perla Martínez
- Camera setup: Multi-camera
- Running time: 45 minutes
- Production companies: Disney Media Networks Latin America; Azteca

Original release
- Network: Azteca Trece
- Release: May 13 – October 4, 2013

Related
- La otra cara del alma; Prohibido amar; Hermanos y hermanas

Secretos de Familia (English: Family Secrets) is a Mexican telenovela, remake of Brothers & Sisters by Azteca in 2013. In January 2013, confirmed cast included Sergio Basañez and Anette Michel as the protagonists. From May 13 to October 4, 2013, Azteca 13 aired Secretos de Familia, replacing La Otra Cara del Alma.

== Plot summary ==
Nora Ventura (Ofelia Medina), matriarch of the Ventura family, awaits the return of her daughter, Cecilia (Anette Michel), who went to Monterrey for two years. But Cecilia returns home with a broken heart, because her boyfriend, Juan Pablo (Juan Pablo Medina), has been unfaithful to him; However, he decides to keep it a secret.

When Cecilia arrives at her house, she is received by all with great joy, but it soon becomes apparent that Eduardo (Jesús Vargas), Cecilia's father and Nora's husband, is cold with his wife; This is because he has been unfaithful for years. On the other hand, Sandra (Fran Meric), Daniel (Alberto Casanova) and Andrés (Luis Ernesto Franco), Cecilia's brothers, begin to suspect that their uncle Raul is making embezzlements.

Later, Cecilia meets in a park a young man named Maximiliano Miranda (Sergio Basañez), whom he falls in love with, and with whom he also coincides in his work. However, the joy and harmony of the Ventura will be truncated with the sudden death of Eduardo in a family reunion.

From that moment, the four brothers would be involved in situations they could have never expected, because now they will have to work together to save the company, stay united and support Nora (Ofelia Medina), who will have to endure the lover of her late husband.

== Cast ==
=== Main ===
- Sergio Basañez as Maximiliano Miranda
- Anette Michel as Cecilia Ventura
- Patricia Bernal as Karina Álvarez
- Alberto Casanova as Daniel Ventura
- Héctor Arredondo as Leonardo Ventura
- Fran Meric as Sandra Ventura
- Luis Ernesto Franco as Andrés Ventura
- Luis Miguel Lombana as Raúl
- Bárbara de Regil as Sofía Ventura Álvarez
- Ángela Fuste as Patricia Mendoza de Miranda
- Martín Altomaro as Roberto
- Francisco Angelini as Tomás
- Nubia Martí as Evangelina Mendoza
- Ariana Ron Pedrique as Mónica
- Concepción Márquez as Nieves
- Jesús Vargas as Eduardo Ventura
- Hugo Stiglitz as Eduardo Ventura
- Gala Montes as Julieta Miranda
- Ivana María as María Ventura
- Marlon Bidart as Luis Ventura
- Adrián Herrera as Santiago Miranda
- Ofelia Medina as Nora Ventura

=== Recurring ===
- Fernando Becerril as Rogelio
- Héctor Bonilla as Manuel
- Ariel López Padilla as Vicente Quiroz
- Juan Pablo Medina as Juan Pablo
- Guillermo Quintanilla as David
- Gloria Stalina as Marisol
