= Amor en custodia (Mexican TV series) =

Mexican television drama

- Also known as: Pasiones Prohibidas
- Developed by: Emilia Lamothe
- Starring: Margarita Gralia; Sergio Basañez; Paola Núñez; Andrés Palacios; Fabiana Perzabal; Carmen Madrid; Verónica Merchant; Irene Arcila
- Narrated by: Margarita Gralia
- Opening theme: "Abre tu Corazón"; Olga Tañón
- Country of origin: Mexico
- Original language: Spanish
- No. of episodes: 236

Production
- Executive producers: Emilia Lamothe; Mario O. Garcés; José Solano; Román Villaseñor
- Production locations: Mexico City, Mexico
- Running time: 48 minutes
- Production company: TV Azteca

Original release
- Network: Azteca Trece
- Release: July 18, 2005 – August 11, 2006

Related
- Amor en custodia (2009); Amores verdaderos (2012); Guardián de mi vida (2026)

Amor en custodia is a Mexican television drama inspired by the popular Argentine telenovela of the same name and developed and produced by Emilia Lamothe. The story focuses on and satirizes the lives of socialite teens and young adults growing up in Mexico City. It deals with sexuality, drugs, money, jealousy and other issues. It aired from July 18, 2005 to August 11, 2006.

The series has been shown in more than 13 countries, including the USA, Europe, Japan, Thailand, and Latin America, and has been translated into English, French, Japanese, and German.

== Production ==
=== Conception ===
The project was originally intended as a film to be made by Zeta Films, with La Mujer de Mi Hermano creator Jaime Bayly set to write the screenplay, actress Angélica Aragón to star as Paz Achával Urién, and Bárbara Mori to portray Paz's daughter Barbara. The film never went into production and was ultimately canceled.

The project was later redesigned as a TV-movie, for Televisa, but again the production was canceled.

Development of the show, this time as a TV series to be shown on TV Azteca, finally began on January 5, 2005, when TV Azteca gave it a put pilot commitment, with Emilia Lamothe as writer and executive producer. In February 2005, the network confirmed the pilot order, and Mario O. Garcés was named as co-writer.

=== Music ===
Pop singer Alexandre Pires was credited with the music selection used in the series, though the cast played a part in the choice, and even recorded some of their own songs for inclusion.

In contrast to his usual style of Spanish independent music and alternative rock artists, Pires largely used pop songs for the Mexican version, and current Top 40 hits for the American version. He explained, "Since the show is based on high class profiled families, I'm going for more pop-ish sounds, for the USA version. I want to attract new viewers, so I will be using some top 40 English songs from the best artists today and from great artists internationally."

The opening theme song is Abre tu Corazón, performed by Olga Tañón.

=== Broadcasting history ===
Originally scheduled to air on June 13, 2005, the initial episode of the series was delayed by a week. As a result, the previously planned two-hour season special of La Academia was edited down to one hour to accommodate it. It finally made its television debut on Canal 7, in Mexico City, on June 19, 2005 at 10:00 p.m. TV Azteca broadcast the first episode nationally the following day, at 9:00 p.m.

In the United States, the series premiered on Azteca America on July 18, 2005 at 9:00pm, a month after the original Mexican showing.

The first episode was provided as a free download at the series' official website on June 30, 2005.

At the end of the first season, TV Azteca canceled the Canal 7 broadcast due to poor reception by the public.

The series was suspended in Argentina between November and January, over a dispute concerning the rights to the story. During the suspension, TV Azteca repeated the first episodes, hoping that the series would later return. However, it did not return on the air in Argentina, except for the last episodes of the first season.

== Cast and characters ==
Featuring four main characters, majority of the cast was assembled from January to March 2005. Bárbara Mori was originally cast in the female lead role of Barbara, but due to scheduling problems she was forced to pull out and was replaced by Paola Núñez. Margarita Gralia was then signed to play Paz.

Andrés Palacios auditioned for one of the lead roles, Pacheco, but was made second choice after Sebastián Estevanez. However, before filming began, Estevanez had to pull out for personal reasons and Palacios got the part.

With just a month before the scheduled release of the first episode, Sergio Basañez was cast to play Paz's love interest, Manuel.

In the eighth season and some of the eleventh season, Sebastián Estevanez appeared as Barbara's boyfriend and bodyguard.

The rest of the cast were chosen as the series continued, and by early July 2006 casting stopped as the series was coming to an end.

Actor	Character	Season	Note
Margarita Gralia	Paz Achával Urién	1 - 11	Complete series
Paola Núñez	Bárbara Bazterrica	1 - 11	Complete series
Sergio Basañez	Juan Manuel Aguirre	1 - 11	Complete series
Adriana Louvier	Tatiana Aguirre	1 - 11	Complete series
Andrés Palacios	Nicolás Pacheco	1 - 11	Complete series
Verónica Merchant	Victoría	3 - 11	(*)Returned from Europe
Sebastián Estevanez	Mauro Mendoza	8 - 11	Left before finale
Irene Arcila	Inés	1 - 11	Complete series
Carmen Madrid	Gabriela	1 - 3, 8 - 11	Died, and twin sister appeared
Lupita Sandoval	Nora	1 - 11	Complete series

(*) Transferred from "guest star" status to main cast mid-season.

== Reception ==
=== Critical response ===
Amor en Custodia initially received strong reviews. Due to its pedigree as an adaptation of the Argentine version, it was one of the most anticipated new shows of 2005. The first week showing garnered positive reviews from sources such as Ventaneando, The Washington Post, Los Angeles Times and Yahoo!.

== DVD release ==
There was originally no plan to release the series on DVD, but with the success of bootleg DVD versions in Mexico, the USA, Europe, and Argentina, and Internet piracy, a 2-disc DVD was released on February 13, 2007.

== Remake ==
In 2012, Nicandro Díaz González produced Amores verdaderos, a Mexican telenovela for Televisa. Erika Buenfil, Eduardo Yáñez, Eiza González and Sebastian Rulli starred as the protagonists, while Marjorie de Sousa, Guillermo Capetillo, Enrique Rocha and Francisco Gattorno starred as the antagonists.
