= Los Rey =

Mexican telenovela

- Genre: Telenovela
- Created by: David Jacobs; Adaptation: Luis Felipe Ybarra
- Written by: Luis Felipe Ybarra; José Luis Duran; Carlos Quintanilla; Enrique Renteria
- Starring: Rossana Nájera; Michel Brown; Leonardo García; Ofelia Medina; Fernando Luján; Juan Alfonso Baptista
- Opening theme: "El Imperio de Los Rey" by Los Tigritos
- Country of origin: Mexico
- Original language: Spanish
- No. of episodes: 125 (list of episodes)

Production
- Executive producers: Elisa Salinas Gómez; Pedro Lira García; Rafael Gutiérrez Rodríguez
- Production locations: Mexico City, Mexico; Hacienda San Gabriel, Cuernavaca; Las Vegas, Nevada
- Camera setup: Multi-camera

Original release
- Network: TV Azteca
- Release: 3 September 2012 – 22 February 2013

Related
- La mujer de Judas; Vivir a destiempo

Los Rey (It All Stays in the Family) is a Mexican telenovela produced by Elisa Salinas for Azteca. It stars Leonardo Garcia, with Michel Brown and Rossana Najera as the protagonists, both dubbed as "La pareja" in the face card, alongside Juan Alfonso Baptista, Ana Belena, Fernando Alonso, Cecilia Ponce, José Alonso, Ofelia Medina, Fernando Luján, Ariel López Padilla, Victor Huggo Martin, and Elizabeth Cervantes. Rafael Gutiérrez and Rodrigo Cachero serve as the directors. Los Rey is written by Luis Felipe Ybarra who is also the associate producer. From 3 September 2012 to 22 February 2013, Azteca 13 broadcast Los Rey, replacing La mujer de Judas.

== Synopsis ==
Everardo Rey is a powerful businessman who leads the Rey Industrial Group in Mexico. He has three sons: Everardo "Vado", Guillermo and Matías. His wife is Manuela San Vicente.

Behind their image of wealth, there is a story of betrayal and deceit, meticulously planned by Everardo Rey, a man who grew up with Pedro Malvido, his best friend. Both were poor and in their desire to improve their quality of life, they sought the American Dream. In the US, they agree to forget Manuela San Vicente, a high class girl they both loved. Several years later, having made their fortunes, Everardo and Pedro return to Mexico to start a glass collection business. However, Everardo Rey breaks his agreement with Pedro and marries Manuela.

Ruined, Pedro discovers fraud, as well as his friend's betrayal. With his family, Pedro Luis tries to start over again, but he is always waiting for a chance to take revenge on Everardo Rey. Meanwhile, a deep and real love is born between Pedro's daughter Lorenza Malvido and Matías Rey, who try to ease the hatred between their families in order to be happy together in peace.

== Casting ==
Garcia, Brown and Baptista were the first to be cast in this adaptation. In this telenovela, Leonardo Garcia takes on his first villain role ever in his career, while Nájera debuts as a main protagonist and it also marks the return of Ofelia Medina to the small screen. Edgar Castillo Sosa was appointed as the casting director for the telenovela.

Fernando Lujan and Pepe Alonso reunites again as enemies for the third time in this series.

Jonathan Islas was offered the role of Leonardo in the novela but he declined the offer and joins Telemundo's El Rostro de la Venganza instead.

The telenovela later features Sergio Basañez as Ronco Abadi, a hidden character, which is his first villain role for Azteca.

== Filming ==
The filming of promotional clips and opening montage started on 30 June The filming started on 30 July. In the end, the original opening montage was not used and is replaced by random scenes of the novela. Instead, it was used as the bumpers during commercials. The filming ended on 22 December 2012.

=== Las Vegas ===
On 8 September, cast members Karen Senties, Ariel Lopez Padilla and Leonardo Garcia flew to Las Vegas to film flashback scenes back to 20 years ago.

== Theme songs ==
=== "Los Rey" ===
Also known as "El imperio de los Rey" in La Academia 10
Opening theme

- Sung by Los Tigrillos

=== "Algo entre los dos" ===
- Original version by Edgar Azcuy

Lorenza and Matias' love theme

- Solo version sung by Rykardo Hernandez.

Tamara and Gervasio's theme

- Duet version sung by Cynthia and Raul Sandoval.

=== Other featured songs ===
Amado and Fina's themes

- "Lloran las rosas" a cover version of Christian Castro's original song.
- "Amores prohibidos" by Elefante.

== Public relations ==
=== Autograph session ===
Date	Location	Cast
21 Sept. 2012	Perisur shopping center	Brown, Najera, Garcia
28 Sept. 2012	Elektra Mega Toluca	Cervantes, De la Fuente, Baptista, Belena
5 Oct. 2012	Elektra Villas de la Hacienda	Miranda, Fernando Alonso, De la Fuente

=== TV Addict Golden Awards ===
Year	Category	Nominated	Result
2012	Best wardrobe	Elisa Salinas	winner
2012	Best female comeback	Ophelia Medina	winner
2012	Best male comeback	Michael Brown	Winner
2012	Female revelation	Carolina Miranda	winner
2012	Best Female All-Star Pitch	Rossana Nájera	winner
2012	Best telenovela on Tv Azteca	Elisa Salinas	Winner
