= Cuando seas mía =

2001-2002 Mexican telenovela

- Genre: Telenovela
- Created by: Fernando Gaitán; Jose Luis Durán
- Directed by: Rafael Gutiérrez; Martin Barraza; Julio Fons
- Starring: Silvia Navarro; Sergio Basañez; Rodrigo Abed; Martha Cristiana; Anette Michel; Margarita Gralia; Luis Felipe Tovar; Sergio Bustamante; Evangelina Elizondo
- Opening theme: "Cuando Seas Mía" by Son by Four "Entra En Mi Vida" & "Kilómetros" by Sin Bandera
- Ending theme: "Quisiera" by Juan Luis Guerra
- Country of origin: Mexico
- Original language: Spanish
- No. of episodes: 238

Production
- Executive producers: Rafael Gutiérrez; Fides Velasco
- Producers: Juan David Burns; Elisa Salinas
- Production location: Mexico City
- Camera setup: Multi-camera
- Running time: 42 minutes
- Production company: TV Azteca

Original release
- Network: Azteca Trece
- Release: May 7, 2001 – April 12, 2002

Related
- Tío Alberto (2000-2001); Por tí (2002)

Cuando seas mía (transl. When You Will Be Mine) is a Mexican telenovela produced by Juan David Burns and Elisa Salinas for TV Azteca. It was broadcast on Azteca Trece (now Azteca Uno) from Monday May 7, 2001 to Friday April 12, 2002 for 238 episodes. It is a remake of the 1994 Colombian telenovela Café, con aroma de mujer, and the second reunion for Silvia Navarro and Sergio Basañez as protagonists.

== Cast ==
=== Main cast ===
Silvia Navarro .... Teresa Suárez "The Paloma" / Elena Olivares Maldonado de Sánchez Serrano/ Margot
Sergio Basañez ... Diego Sánchez Serrano Cortés
Martha Cristiana ... "Berenice Sandoval Portocarrero De Sánchez Serrano "

=== Primary actors ===
Margarita Gralia ... Angela Vallejo de Sánchez Serrano. ''Villain. In the end stays alone''
Sergio de Bustamante ... Juan Francisco Sánchez Serrano
Evangelina Elizondo ... Inés Viuda de Sánchez Serrano
Luis Felipe Tovar ... Miguel Alfonso Tejeiros y Caballero. ''Villain. Shot to death by the police''
Anette Michel ... Bárbara Castrejón de Sánchez Serrano. ''Villain. In love with Fabian. Goes to jail''
Rodrigo Abed ... Fabián Sánchez Serrano. ''Main Villain. Killed by Diego in self-defense''
Laura Padilla ... Soledad Suarez
Rodrigo Cachero ... Mariano Sanz

=== Protagonists ===
Iliana Fox ... Diana Sánchez- Serrano Cortés de Tejeiros
Adrián Makala....Harold McKlane
Ana Serradilla ... Daniela Sánchez- Serrano Cortés de McKlane
Alejandro Lukini ... Jeremy MacGregor
Ramiro Huerta ... Aurelio Durán
Juan Pablo Medina ... Bernardo Sánchez Serrano
Enrique Becker ... Jorge Latorre
Gloria Peralta ... Marcia Fontalvo
Fernando Sarfatti ... Giancarlo Mondriani
Homero Wimer ... Roberto Avellaneda

=== Special participations ===
Leonardo Daniel ... Joaquín Sánchez Serrano
Daniela Schmidt ... Antonia Ruis
Claudia Soberón ... Lucero
Jose Gonzalez Marquez ... Lorenzo Sánchez Serrano
Tania Arredondo ... Leonor
Claudine Sosa ... Josefina
Maribel Rodríguez ... Graciela
Jesus Estrada ... Juancho Mejia
Adriana Parra ... Ximena de Fontalvo
Carolina Carvajal ... Matilde Arango. ''Villain. Crazy. Killed her uncle Manuel and Josefina. In love with Jeremy. Wanted to kill Diana''
Alejandro Ciangherotti ... Ricardo Sandoval.
Carmen Delgado ... Constanza de Sandoval
Gabriela Andrade ... Margarita de Sanchéz Serrano
Renata del Castillo ... Martha

=== Special guest stars ===
Guest stars in pilot episode
Margarita Sanz

== International broadcasts ==
Country	Alternate title/translation	TV network(s)	Airdate	Weekly schedule	Timeslot
Mexico	Cuando Seas Mia	Azteca 13	May 7, 2001 – April 12, 2002	Monday-Friday	8:00 pm
Spain	Cuando Seas Mia	TVE 1, TVE Internacional	2001 – 2002	Monday-Friday	5:10 pm
Croatia	Kad budeš moja	Nova TV	2001	Monday-Friday	6 pm
Slovenia	Ko boš moja	POP TV	2001 – 2002	Monday-Friday	6 pm
USA	Cuando Seas Mia	Azteca America	2001 – 2002	Monday-Friday	
Slovakia	Keď budeš moja	Markíza	February 27, 2002 – August 14, 2002	Monday-Friday	5 pm
Slovakia	Keď budeš moja	Markíza	July 1, 2004 – June 22, 2005	Monday-Friday	8 am
Slovakia	Keď budeš moja	Markíza	September 3, 2007 – February 29, 2008	Monday-Friday	8 am
Slovakia	Keď budeš moja	TV Doma			
Slovakia	Keď budeš moja	TV Doma	December 3, 2009 – April 2, 2010	Monday-Sunday	4 pm
Slovakia	Keď budeš moja	TV Doma	February 13, 2012 – December 14, 2012	Monday-Friday	
Slovakia	Keď budeš moja	TV Doma	January 7, 2014 – June 20, 2014	Monday-Friday	
Slovakia	Keď budeš moja	TV Doma	August 1, 2016 – January, 2017	Monday-Friday	
Slovakia	Keď budeš moja	TV Doma	March 19, 2018 – August 31, 2018	Monday-Friday	
Romania	Vei fi a mea Paloma	Acasa TV			
Greece	Παλόμα και Λορέντζο (Paloma and Lorenzo)	Star Channel	September 23, 2002 – August 29, 2003	Monday-Friday at 17:30	
Philippines	Paloma	ABS-CBN	2002 – 2003	Monday-Friday	3:30 PM
Albania	Kur ti të jesh e imja	Top Channel	2003 – 2004	Monday-Saturday	
Cyprus	Παλόμα και Λορέντζο (Paloma and Lorenzo)	Sigma TV	January 21, 2004 – December 21, 2004	Monday-Friday at 19:20	
Kenya	Cuando Seas Mia	KTN	2004 – 2006	Saturday & Sunday	8 pm
Kosovo	Kur ti të jesh e imja	RTV21	2005	Monday-Friday	
Nigeria	When you are mine	AIT	2005 – 2006	Monday-Friday	9 pm
Uganda	Paloma / Cuando Seas Mia	Bukedde TV 1	2012 – 2013	Monday-Friday at 20:30	
Malaysia	Cuando Seas Mia	TV2		Monday-Friday at 13:30	
Namibia	When you are mine				

== Soundtrack ==
=== Cuando Seas Mía ===
- Performed by:
  Son by Four
- Written by:
  Diane Warren "Miss Me So Bad"
- Spanish version:
  Omar Alfanno
  Yoel Henriquez

Epic/Sony Music
Opening theme from episode 1 to 70

=== Entra En Mi Vida ===
- Performed by:
  Sin Bandera
- Written by:
  Leonel Garcia
  Noel Schajris

Sony Music
Opening theme from episode 71 to

=== Kilometros ===
- Performed by:
  Sin Bandera
- Written by:
  Leonel Garcia
  Noel Schajris

Sony Music
Opening theme from episode 190 to

=== Quisiera ===
- Performed by:
  Juan Luis Guerra
  440
- Written by:
  Juan Luis Guerra

Karen Publishing
Ending theme for episode 1 to 70

=== Burbujas de Amor, La Billirubina, Como abeja al panal ===
- Performed by:
  Juan Luis Guerra
  440
- Written by:
  Juan Luis Guerra

Karen Publishing

=== Paloma Negra, Cucurrucucú paloma ===
- Performed by:
  Lola Beltrán
- Written by:
  Tomás Méndez

EMMI PHAM

=== Song listing ===
01. Son by four - Cuando seas mia
02. Juan Luis Guerra - Quisiera
03. Juan Luis Guerra - Burbujas de Amor
04. Lola Beltran - Paloma negra
05. Lola Beltran - Cucurrucucu Paloma
06. Sergio Basanez - Como quien pierde una estrella
07. Sin bandera - Entra en mi vida
08. Son by four - Miss me so bad
09. Luis Fonsi - Imaginame sin ti
10. Pedro Guerra - Cerca del amor
11. Miguel Aceves Mejias - Por un amor
12. Alejandro Fernandez - Como quien pierde una estrella
13. Los Panchos - Perfidia
14. Son by four - A puro dolor (Balada)
15. Juan Luis Guerra - Quisiera (salsa)
16. Son by four - Cuando seas mia (salsa)
17. Sergio Basanez - Perfidia
18. Sin Bandera - Kilometros
19. Pedro Infante - Con un Polvo y Otro Polvo
