= Emperatriz (Mexican TV series) =

- Gabriela Spanic and Bernie Paz in Emperatriz
- Created by: Jose Ignacio Cabrujas; Hector Forero; Mauricio Somuano
- Developed by: Azteca; Azteca Novelas: Alberto Santini Lara; Elisa Salinas
- Directed by: Javier Patron Fox; Carlos Angel Guerra; Martin Barraza; Luis Sernado Reyes
- Starring: Gabriela Spanic; Bernie Paz; Sergio de Bustamante; Rafael Sanchez Navarro; Adriana Louvier; Marimar Vega; Miri Higareda; Julieta Egurrola
- Theme music composer: Jorge Avendaño Lührs
- Opening theme: "Emperatriz de mis sueños" by Mónica Naranjo
- Country of origin: Mexico
- Original language: Spanish
- No. of episodes: 155

Production
- Executive producer: Fides Velasco
- Producer: Jacky Castro
- Production locations: Mexico City, Mexico; Los Angeles
- Editors: Rigel Sosa Andrade; Reyna Estudillo
- Camera setup: Multi-camera
- Running time: 40–45 minutes
- Production company: TV Azteca

Original release
- Network: Azteca 13/Azteca America
- Release: 5 April – 8 November 2011

Related
- Emperatriz (Venezuelan TV series)

Emperatriz is a Mexican telenovela produced by Fides Velasco for Azteca. It stars Gabriela Spanic as the title character, while Bernie Paz as the male lead. Other casts include Sergio de Bustamante, Julieta Egurrola, Adriana Louvier, Marimar Vega, Miriam Higareda, Alberto Guerra, Rafael Sanchez Navarro and Carmen Delgado. Omar Fierro made special appearance in the first five episodes, and later returns in the final part of the series. The filming process took place between 17 March 2011 and 30 September 2011. The series premiered on 5 April 2011, 19 days after filming the first scene, at 8:30 p.m., occupying Prófugas del destino's slot, and ended on 8 November 2011. Emperatriz is also known as best-selling telenovela of 2011.

== Synopsis ==
Emperatriz (Gabriela Spanic) is an ex-con that has a relationship with Armando (Omar Fierro) who's a married man. Under false pretenses Emperatriz believed he truly love her but later discovered he was married. They had a daughter together but her mother persuaded to leave it with Armando and his wife while she is still in prison. Years later, after Armando's latest visit Emperatriz got pregnant, but have a miscarriage provoked by a discussion over the phone with Armando. While in the hospital she discovers that Armando betrayed her, he only manipulated her and he developed a scheme where Emperatriz will go to jail for the bank fraud he committed. Manuel (Rafael Sanchez Navarro) tells her to marry him in exchange of evidence he has against Armando.

At her mother's advice, Emperatriz gave her daughter away to Armando and his wife Alma Rosa, the daughter of Justo del Real (Sergio de Bustamante), the owner of the company del Real. Armando has 2 more daughters with Alma Rosa: Elisa and Elena. Emperatriz confronts Alma Rosa to find out who of the 3 girls is her daughter but during the confrontation Alma Rosa dies. Justo wants to take revenge on Emperatriz because of this.

Emperatriz's best friend Angela "Quimera" Galvan (Niurka Marcos) and Manuel set her up and Emperatriz spends 7 years in prison for a fraud she didn't commit. Both Emperatriz and Quimera fell in love with Armando during their youth. Quimera miscarried Armando's son because she fell down the stairs and she blames her son Nico for the accident. Quimera owns a nightclub.

Emperatriz returns from prison. She divorced Manuel. She searches for her daughter with Armando: she turns out to be Esther (Adriana Louvier). Both Emperatriz and Esther fall in love with Alejandro Miranda (Bernie Paz). Armando is presumed dead.

Justo turns out to be Emperatriz's father. Justo shoots Alejandro in the head and he suffers from memory loss.

It turns out that Armando is alive and that he had been kept hidden and imprisoned by Justo in cell, in a warehouse. Armando escapes. Alejandro and Emperatriz discover Justo but they keep him locked in the same warehouse. Manuel buries Justo alive and then goes away. Armando witnesses it but he doesn't save Justo. Perfecta dies.

After a turn of events Esther falls in love with Nico, Quimera and Manuel's son. Emperatriz witnesses Alejandro and Quimera kissing. She has a car accident and gets blind. Afterwards she recovers.

Quimera wants to shoot Emperatriz but Esther protects her and is shot in the back. Afterwards, at her club, she and some bodyguards fire towards Emperatriz, Alejandro and some cops, while trying to escape. Quimera reveals Emperatriz that it was Manuel and she who set her up for fraud and that they sent her in prison years before. She also tells her she did it because she always took everything away from her, for example Armando. Quimera asks Manuel on the phone to release her from prison otherwise she will testify against him to the police. A man shoots Quimera as she was testifying against Manuel at his order. Armando testifies against Manuel. Nico also wants to send into prison.

Emperatriz becomes the main shareholder of del Real Company. She tells Manuel to get out of the company. Afterwards, at del Real Company, Manuel threatens Emperatriz with a knife but Alejandro saves her. The police arrives to capture Manuel. He sets the basement on fire and escapes with the help of an ambulance.

At his house, Manuel drugs Emperatriz and then buries her alive, saying she did everything for her, that he loves her. Alejandro and a detective save her. The police arrives. Manuel jumps off his house.

Alejandro and Emperatriz get married. 3 years later, the main characters are shown at a party: Alejandro and Emperatriz have twins (girls), Nico and Esther are waiting for a baby, Elisa and her husband, Elena and her husband Gonzalo have a boy.

== Cast ==
=== Main cast ===
Actor	Character	Description
Gabriela Spanic	Emperatriz Jurado	Protagonist. In search of her daughter with Armando (Esther). In love with Alejandro. Perfecta and Justo's daughter.
Bernie Paz	Alejandro Miranda	Protagonist. In love with Emperatriz. Justo's son-in-law.
Sergio de Bustamante	Justo Del Real	Main Villain. Father of Alma Rosa, Margarita and Emperatriz. Grandfather of Elena, Elisa and Esther. Perfecta's ex-lover. Separates Emperatriz from her daughter (Esther) as a revenge for Alma Rosa's death. Faked Leonor's death. After he was buried alive by Manuel, Armando dug him up but chose to leave him to die. Dies buried alive by order of Manuel.
Adriana Louvier	Esther Mendoza Del Real	Co-protagonist. Daughter of Emperatriz and Armando. In love with Alejandro, then love with Nicolas.
Marimar Vega	Elisa Mendoza Del Real / Luna	Co-protagonist. Daughter of Alma Rosa and Armando. In love with Mauricio. Juan Pablo's mother. Raised by La Gata after her parents' death. Wants revenge on Emperatriz.
Miriam Higareda	Elena Mendoza Del Real	Co-protagonist. Daughter of Alma Rosa and Armando. Raised by Justo after her parents' death. In love with Gonzalo.
Julieta Egurrola	Perfecta Jurado	Emperatriz's mother, Roberto's wife. Gave Esther to Armando 20 years ago. During her youth, she was raped by Justo. Later, she helped Leonor.
Rafael Sanchez Navarro	Manuel Leon (fictional character)	Villain. Emperatriz's ex-husband. Nico's father. Together with Quimera, they blamed Armando and Emperatriz for a fraud they committed. Buried Justo alive. Commits suicide by jumping off his house.
Carmen Delgado	Graciela "Gata" Mendoza	Armando's sister. Benito's ex-wife. In love with Benito and Manuel. Aunt of Esther, Elisa and Elena
Alberto Guerra	Mauricio Gomez	A medical doctor. In love with Elisa. Juan Pablo's father
Jorge Alberti	Nicolas "Nico" Galvan Castillo	A chef. Esther's colleague. In love with Esther. Quimera and Manuel's son. Special Participation
Erick Chapa	David	In love with Elisa. Mauricio's love rival. Special Participation
Carlos Martinez	Gonzalo Montalvan	A young director from Spain. In love with Elena
René Campero	Roberto Paredes	Perfecta's husband. Emperatriz's stepfather. Dies after being hit by a car while drunk.
Concepción Márquez	Agustina Morales	Del Real's housekeeper. Nanny of Alma Rosa, Esther, Elisa and Elena. Shot herself and dies.
Dora Montero	Lola	Alejandro's maid
Ana Karina Guevara	Coco Alvarez	Emperatriz's secretary and friend.
Fabian Peña	Beto "Benito" Ramirez	Gata's ex-husband, Manuel's right-hand man / driver, killed by Manuel's order
Alma Rosa Añorve	Consuelo	Quimera's sister. Special Participation
Niurka Marcos	Angela "Quimera" Galvan	Villain. Has a son with Manuel, named Nico. Was Emperatriz's best friend. She and Emperatriz fell in love with Armando during their youth. One of the real culprit behind Armando and Emperatriz's fraud charges. She owns a nightclub named "Quimera Cristal". Long time ago, she was pregnant with Armando's son but had a miscarriage after she fell from stairs. Blames Nico for the incident. Wants to shoot Emperatriz but Esther covers her and is injured in the back. Shot to death in prison by order of Manuel.
Omar Fierro	Armando Mendoza	Emperatriz's ex-lover, still in love with Emperatriz. Alma Rosa's husband, father of Esther, Elisa and Elena. Committed suicide in the fifth episode, but in episode 93, it was revealed that he had been abducted by Justo since his supposed death and never committed any fraud. He returns to seek revenge.

=== Special guest stars ===
Actor	Character	Description
Mercedes Pascual	Leonor Bustamante	Perfecta's former employer. Justo's ex-wife, Mother of Alma Rosa and Margarita. Killed by orders of Justo
Marcela Pezet	Isabel Cristina Andueza de Miranda	Villain Alejandro's wife. Was a prostitute in Switzerland. A con.
Cristina Michaus	Gina Medina "La Caimana"	Emperatriz's cell mate.
Martin Navarrete	Fernando Casillas	A public prosecutor.
Mar Carrera	Alma Rosa Del Real de Mendoza	Justo and Leonor's daughter, Armando's wife. Mother of Elisa and Elena. Dies of heart attack
Marcela Guirado	Esther Mendoza (young)	Daughter of Emperatriz and Armando.
Alicia Jaziz	Elisa Mendoza (young)	Daughter of Alma Rosa and Armando.
Alejandra Zaid	Elena Mendoza (young)	Daughter of Alma Rosa and Armando.
Irma Infante	Antonieta	Mother of Isabel Cristina.
Larisa Mendizabal	Doris	Justo's fiancée.
Daniela Garmendia	Cinthia	Benito's lover. Pregnant with his child.
Guillermo Larrea	Jorge	Isabel's husband
Erika de la Rosa	Dr. Ximena	Villain A nutritionist with unstable mental condition. In love with Mauricio.
Paloma Woolrich	Josefa	Gonzalo's mother. Elena's mother-in-law
Sandra Destenave	Marlene Martinez	Villain Alejandro and Federico's ex-classmate. Alejandro's ex-girlfriend and still in love with him. Married Manuel for his wealth but during their honeymoon, she was poisoned to death by Manuel.
Mar Carrera	Alma Rosa	

=== Supporting cast ===
Actor	Character	Description
David Muri	Federico	Alejandro's friend. Emperatriz's lawyer
Aurora Gil	Lulu	A prisoner. Was Elisa's cell mate, later became the friend of Emperatriz
Estela Cano	Barbara	Elena's rival in the acting academy.
Citlali Galindo	Lorena Saldivar	Justo's personal assistant.
Alfonso Bravo	Jaime	Roberto's nephew. An inspector.
Carlos Ceja		Cinthia's brother
Carlos Hernan Romo		Cinthia's brother
Luis Rene Aguirre	Leopoldo	Benito's friend, raped Elisa, killed by Justo
Matilde Miranda	Norma	Emperatriz's maid
Marco Zetina	Gustavo	Esther's colleague
Julio Casado	Freddy Carreño	Emperatriz's friend and make-up artist.
Elia Domenzain	Mariana Ramirez	Prison coordinator
Arturo Echeverría		
Blas Garcia	Judge	
Sandra Benitez	Estefania	

== Production ==
- This is the first appearance of Gabriela Spanic for Azteca's telenovela after she signed a contract with the company in December 2010.
- Gaby Spanic wanted the role since she was a huge fan of the original version when it was aired in Venezuela, her birth country.
- Proposed actresses for the role Emperatriz were Anette Michel and Edith González. While for Esther's role, Paola Nunez was mentioned, Gabriela Vergara and Edith González portrayed Emperatriz in two different unofficial pilot trailers.
- Edith González refused to work in this telenovela since the producers wanted Niurka Marcos, whom she had problem in Salome, to star in this telenovela too. Gonzalez eventually joins Cielo rojo and Niurka's participation was canceled and was replaced by Marcela Pezet. Niurka rejoins Emperatriz in its final stage.
- Whereas for the male leads, Christian Meier, José Ángel Llamas and Mauricio Islas were proposed, Spanic refused to work with Islas and Llamas. She had once been romantically involved with Llamas while filming La venganza and had conflicts with Islas while filming Prisionera.
- An unofficial pilot was released starring Edith González, Mauricio Islas and Alejandra Lazcano as Emperatriz, Alejandro and Esther respectively. All three left for Cielo rojo. Sergio De Bustamante, Marimar Vega and Miri Higareda are also as seen in the trailer portraying their respective roles but with different looks. Other actors includes Rafael Sanchez Navarro portraying Armando Mendoza and Monica Dionne as Alma Rosa.
- Bernie Paz, who was cast a week before the air date has worked together with Spanic in Tierra de Pasiones in 2006, where Paz portrayed the evil Dr. Fernando who is willing to do anything to have Valeria (Spanic). Spanic herself wanted to work with Paz again.
- This novela marks the return of many actors such as Daniela Garmendia, Mercedes Pascual (last appeared in 2004 with Los Sanchez) and Marcela Pezet.
- This novela is also the return of Azteca Digital's director, Elisa Salinas, now as the consulting producer of Azteca Novelas.
- Bethel Flores was originally contacted as the writer of this version but was replaced by Veronica Suarez. After five episodes, Suarez left and was replaced by famous Colombian writer, Hector Forero, who had previously worked in various Azteca Novelas' productions before. In June 2011, Flores was contacted again and is set to join Forero and Mauricio Somuano in the third season of this telenovela, starting from the episode 80.
- Most actors were part of TV Azteca's La duda, produced by Velasco in 2002. De Bustamante and Egurrola played husband and wife, with Pascual as De Bustamante's lover. Spanic's twin sister, Daniela Spanic and Guevara also starred in this novela.
- Director Javier Patron Fox left the novela in mid September to direct the third season of Profugos in Chile, and was replaced by actor/director Martin Barraza, who directed Pobre diabla, Cuando seas mía, Vidas robadas and other telenovelas produced by Fides Velasco.

== Finale ==
Shortly after the grand final episode ended, "Emperatriz" quickly became a trending topic (Mexico) in Twitter. In 30 minutes time, it reached the fourth spot, from the eighth.

The final rating was 15.1

== "Emperatriz de mis sueños" ==
- Performed by Mónica Naranjo
- Written by Jorge Avendaño Lührs
- Editor: TV Azteca Publishing

Copyright Azteca Musica 2011

=== Other songs ===
The solo version of Franco De Vita's "Tan Sólo Tú" was used as the love theme for Elisa and Mauricio.
