= La mujer de Judas (Mexican TV series) =

2012 Mexican telenovela

- De esta leyenda, nacera un gran amor
- Also known as: Legendary Love
- Genre: Telenovela
- Based on: La mujer de Judas by Martín Hahn
- Developed by: Alberto Santini Lara; Elisa Salinas
- Written by: Martín Hahn; Gabriel Santos; Paz Aguirre
- Directed by: Enrique Pineda; Jose Acosta; Lorena Maza
- Starring: Anette Michel; Andrea Martí; Víctor González; Andrea Martí; Geraldine Bazan; Daniel Elbittar
- Theme music composer: Jorge Avendaño Lührs
- Opening theme: "Amor de leyenda" by Dulce
- Country of origin: Mexico
- Original language: Spanish
- No. of episodes: 165

Production
- Executive producer: Maria del Carmen Marcos Rojas
- Producers: Jose Solano Rodriguez; Francisco Sosa
- Production locations: Mexico City, Mexico; Los Angeles; Veracruz
- Cinematography: Ernesto Arreola; Martin Eduardo Sanchez; Jose Manuel Palacio Ortiz; Carlos Ruiz Torres
- Editors: Miguel Angel Sanchez; Fernando Rodriguez Carrillo; Lorenzo Guerra
- Camera setup: Multi-camera
- Running time: 40–45 minutes
- Production company: TV Azteca

Original release
- Network: Azteca Trece
- Release: 16 January – 2 September 2012

La mujer de Judas (The Bride of Judas in English, also known as Legendary Love in non-Spanish countries) is a Mexican romantic horror thriller telenovela produced by Maricarmen Marcos for Azteca. The telenovela is developed by Paz Aguirre and Gabriel Santos, based on the Venezuelan telenovela of the same name. It stars Anette Michel, Victor Gonzalez, and Andrea Marti. It aired from 16 January 2012 to 2 September 2012.

== Synopsis ==
A young lady was unjustly accused of a clergyman's murder. With that horrible crime, she was arrested and spent 23 years in prison. In the present day, a young lady has to figure out the real story behind the Priest's mysterious death. Suddenly, weird events start happening. A series of grisly and horrible murders is washed over the Del Toro residence. These murders are committed by an enigmatic figure whose face is hooded in a smeared wedding veil. Will Natalia find out who is the culprit and identify the real "La Mujer de Judas"?

== Cast ==
=== Main cast ===
Actor	Character	Known as
Anette Michel	Altagracia del Toro Callejas	Berenice and Juan Vicente's daughter, Galilea's half-sister, Casimiro's cousin, accused of murdering Reverend Sebastian on her wedding day, was in love with Simón, Natalia's real mother, spent 23 years in prison, one of the 6 Suspects of being La Mujer de Judas
Víctor González Reynoso	Salomón Salvatierra	Moises' son, in love with Natalia
Andrea Martí	Natalia Leal (Natalia Castellanos del Toro)	Documentalist, Altagracia and Simón's daughter, in love with Salomón
Javier Gómez	Marcos Castellanos Rojas	Obsessed with Altagracia, brother of Reverend Sebastian and Simón; accidentally killed by Altagracia
Mauricio Islas	Simón Castellanos Rojas	Altragracia's fiancee who disappeared on their wedding day, Natalia's father, at the end stays with Altagracia
Omar Fierro	Bruno Cervantes Lara	Juan Vicente's confidante, seduces Altagracia to make her fall in love with him; stabbed to death by La Mujer de Judas
Daniel Elbittar	Alirio Agüero del Toro Bello (Alirio Morera Bello)	Cuquita and Julián's son, Casimiro's stepson, Ismael's brother, falls in love with Natalia, Emma's lover, hates Salomón, at the end disfigured by La Mujer de Judas; ends up in prison
Geraldine Bazan	Emma Balmori Landeros	Maricruz's daughter, Salomón's ex-fiancee, Alirio's lover, hates Natalia, at the end disfigured by La Mujer de Judas; ends up in prison
Sergio Klainer	Buenaventura Briceño	Narda's father, keeper of the secrets of Del Toro family; strangled to death by La Mujer de Judas
Martha Mariana Castro	Joaquina "La Juaca" Leal	Natalia's stepmother, Altagracia's best friend, one of the 6 suspects of being La Mujer de Judas
Marta Verduzco	Berenice Callejas vda. de del Toro	Altagracia's mother, Natalia's grandmother, Juan Vicente's widow, hates the Salvatierra family, at the end revealed as the serial killer - La Mujer de Judas; strangled to death by Irene in prison
Betty Monroe	Galilea (del Toro) Batista	Juan Vicente's illegitimate daughter, Altagracia's half-sister, ambitious, Leoncio's lover, but in love with Ernesto, one of the 6 suspects of being La Mujer de Judas
Niurka Marcos	Ricarda Araujo	Leoncio's wife, Cordelia's mother, had an affair with Juan Vicente, Casimiro's lover, one of the 6 suspects of being La Mujer de Judas; dies in the factory explosion after being trapped by La Mujer de Judas in the washroom
Cecilia Piñeiro	Narda Briceño	Buenaventura's daughter, Ernesto's fiancee, traumatized by her past, one of the 6 suspects of being La Mujer de Judas; strangled to death by La Mujer de Judas
Claudia Marín	Refugio "Cuquita" Bello de Agüero del Toro	Casimiro's wife, Alirio and Ismael's mother, Julián's ex-lover, one of the 6 suspects of being La Mujer de Judas; strangled to death by La Mujer de Judas
Alvaro Guerrero	Casimiro Agüero del Toro	Cuquita's husband, Alirio's stepfather, Ismael's father, Altagracia's cousin, Ricarda's lover; ends up in a mental clinic
Mauricio Aspe	Ernesto Yúñez	Narda's ex-fiancee, in love with Galilea
Elvira Monsell	Ursula Manzur Barrona	Town's witch, Leoncio's aunt; killed by La Mujer de Judas
Nubia Marti	Maricruz Landeros vda. de Balmori	Emma's mother; killed by La Mujer de Judas
Paloma Quezada	Priscila Sosa	Natalia's friend; drowned by La Mujer de Judas
Victor Civeira	Comandante Romero	Town's police detective, at the end resolved the mystery about La Mujer de Judas
Ana Maria Gonzalez	Irene	Berenice's nurse, accomplice of La Mujer de Judas; ends up in prison.
Claudine Sosa	Dulce de Sánchez	Servando's wife, Zulamita's mother, works at Del Toro's mansion
Guillermo Quintanilla	Servando Sánchez	Dulce's husband, Zulamita's father, works at Del Toro's mansion
Juan Vidal	Leoncio Manzur	Ricarda's husband, Cordelia's father, Galilea's ex-lover
Payin Cejudo	Santia García	Juaca's friend, works at Del Toro's mansion
Simón Guevara	Fonsy	Police officer
Maria Luisa Garza	Laila	Altagracia's friend, works in the prison
Vampiro	Dragon	Bruno's accomplice; killed by him
Regina Murguía	Cordelia Manzur Araujo	Ricarda and Leoncio's daughter, has a crush on Pancho
Melissa Barrera	Zulema 'Zulamita' Sácnhez	Dulce and Servando's daughter, has a crush on Ismael
Ramiro Delelis	Francisco 'Pancho' Cañero	Salomón's friend
Israel Cuenca	Ismael Agüero del Toro	Cuquita and Casimiro's son, Alirio's half-brother, painter
Iván Esquivel	René Muzquiz	Cordelia's friend, likes her
Gregory Kauffmann	Jean Michel	Emma's lover, French inversionist; buried alive by La Mujer de Judas
Tamara Fascovich		
José Eduardo Ochoa	Carlos Cervantes	Bruno's son
Ligia Escalante	Chencha	
Ana Elia Garcia	Meche	
Metzli Adamina	Honoria	
Sylvia Mejia		
Carilu Navarro	Domitilia	
Fania Barron	Susana	

=== Secondary cast ===
Actor	Character	Known as
Ramón Medina	Meliton	
Margarita Gralia	Lucrecia de Sosa	Priscila's mother, Special appearance
Dulce	Herself	Cameo appearance
Romina Castro	Carmen	Forensic anthropologist
Marta Aura	Catalina Rojas vda. de Castellanos	Mother of Sebastián, Simon and Marcos
Luis Cárdenas	Juan Vicente del Toro	Berenice's ex-husband, Altagracia and Galilea's father, had an affair with Ricarda, Bruno's confidante
Miguel Sánchez	Reverend Sebastián Castellanos Rojas	Priest, Simon and Marcos's brother; killed by La Mujer De Judas
Fernando Sensores	Rodrigo	Josefa's son
Raquel Saba		
Irene Arcila	Josefa	Rodrigo's mother
Mayela Barrera	Natalia Leal	Young Natalia
Pedro Mira	Julián Morera	Altagracia's ex-fiancee, Cuquita's ex-lover, Alirio's real father; killed by La Mujer De Judas

=== Casting ===
Anette Michel was the first to cast in La Mujer de Judas. Mauricio Ochmann, Manolo Cardona, Daniel Elbittar and Victor Gonzalez auditioned for the roles of Salomon and Alirio. Carla Hernández auditioned for two roles, Emma and Natalia, but eventually failed in both characters. Curiously, Hernandez and Ochmann became the protagonist of Telemundo's Rosa Diamante. Christian Meier auditioned for the role of Marcos, but was replaced by Javier Gomez. Later, the producers cast him for the role of Simon, however the role landed on Mauricio Islas. Peruvian actress Saby Kamalich was originally cast as Berenice, where she was seen in the promos, but on the first day of filming, she was absent and eventually rejected the role due to health problem. Marta Verduzco was selected and it marks her return to telenovelas, after being absent nearly a decade in the industry.
