= Rutas de la vida =

Mexican anthology series

- Promotional poster
- Genre: Anthology; Drama
- Created by: Luis Felipe Ybarra
- Written by: Alejandra Urdiain; José Ramón Méndez; Natalia Nuñez; Patricia Zamorano
- Directed by: Mauricio Menezes; Gerardo Gómez Lapena
- Starring: See list
- Opening theme: Rutas de la vida by Érika Alcocer Luna
- Country of origin: Mexico
- Original language: Spanish
- No. of seasons: 1
- No. of episodes: 60

Production
- Executive producer: Rafael Urióstegui
- Producers: Luis Merlo; Martín Garza
- Production location: Mexico City
- Cinematography: Alfonso Pérez Dávila
- Camera setup: Multi-camera
- Production company: TV Azteca

Original release
- Network: Azteca 7
- Release: 14 March – 7 July 2022

Rutas de la vida (Routes of the Life) is a Mexican drama anthology series produced by Rafael Uriostegui for TV Azteca, being an original story by Luis Felipe Ybarra. It premiered on Azteca 7 on 14 March and ended on 7 July 2022.

== Premise ==
Rutas de la vida deals with the stories that happen every day in public transport in general, which, both the driver and the passenger a minute before boarding or getting off the transport, at a red light, due to twists of fate it can change their lives.

== Cast ==
- Alberto Casanova as Patricio
- Julio Casado as Mateo
- Ignacio Riva Palacio as Aurelio
- Simone Victoria as Doña Socorro
- David Ponce as El Mojarra
- Mario Alberto Monroy as El Sayayin
- Itari Marta as Ludivina
- Ricardo Reynaud as Armando
- Magalli Boysselle as Gloria
- Fabiana Perzabal as detective Fernández
- Laura de Ita as Chole
- Maribel Fernández as Pelacho
- Carlos Millet as Clodomiro
- Alejandra Maldonado as Nurse
- Horacio Colomé as Héctor
- Guillermo Nava as Charlie
- Alejandro Durán as Joel
- Claudia Arce as Alba
- Carla Carrillo as Belinda
- Francisco Angelini a Renzo Salgado
- Bárbara Falconi as Gloria
- Vanessa Acosta as Dana
- Rodolfo Valdés as Gabriel
- Luis Yeverino as Daniel
- Mariana Ávila as Natalia
- Emmanuel Okaury as Daniel
- Susana Diazayas as Alejandra
- Adrián Rubio as Ulises
- Tomás Goros as Aliosán
- Fran Meric as Tonatzin / Soraya
- Alejandra Lazcano as América
- Pilar Ixquic Mata as Doña Fabiana
- Mayra Rojas as Concha
- Joan Kuri as Braulio
- María Fernanda García as Melissa
- Diana Quijano as Vanesa
- Anabel Ferreira as Chief Nun
- Tania Niebla as Bichota
- Marco Treviño as Eufra
- Lorena del Castillo as Valeria
- Iker García as Adrián
- Moisés Suárez as El Aguaslocas
- Mayra Sierra as Diana
- Renata Manterola as Sabrina

== Production ==
The series was announced in January 2021 by TV Azteca, being originally presented as part of the new Azteca 7's original programming in 2021. The production began filming on 4 November 2021 at a location in Mexico City, while filming on sound stage began at the beginning of January 2022 in the Azteca Estudios studios. The series is directed by Mauricio Meneses and Gerardo Gómez, accompanied by a team of writers made up of Alejandra Urdiain, José Ramón Méndez and Natalia Núñez Silvestri, with a total of 60 episodes produced.

== Ratings ==
Season	Timeslot (CT)	Episodes	First aired		Last aired	
Season	Timeslot (CT)	Episodes	Date	Viewers (millions)	Date	Viewers (millions)
1	Mon–Thu 6:30 p.m.	60	14 March 2022	—	7 July 2022	0.39
