= Prófugas del destino =

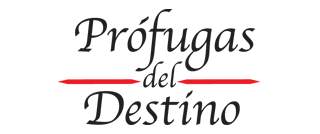
- Created by: Victor Agu
- Developed by: TV Azteca for Azteca Novelas
- Directed by: Mauricio Meneses; Pablo Gomez Saenz Ribot
- Starring: José Ángel Llamas; Gabriela Vergara
- Theme music composer: Jorge Avendaño Lührs
- Opening theme: "Ay amor" Performed by Claudia Sierra
- Country of origin: Mexico
- Original language: Spanish
- No. of episodes: 139

Production
- Executive producer: Rafael Urióstegui
- Producer: Mirna Ojeda
- Production location: Mexico City
- Camera setup: Multi-camera
- Running time: 42 minutes
- Production company: TV Azteca

Original release
- Network: Azteca Trece
- Release: 22 September 2010 – 4 April 2011

Related
- Vidas robadas; Emperatriz

Prófugas del Destino (Running From Destiny) is a Spanish-language telenovela produced by the Mexican television network TV Azteca. The stars and crews are mainly from Mujer comprada.

== Cast ==
=== Main cast ===
Cast	Character	Description
José Ángel Llamas	José Luis Bermúdez	
Gabriela Vergara	Lola	Victim of a terrible trap. She was betrayed by two of her most loved persons
Andrea Martí	Bety	In jail for admitting her sister's crime
Mayra Rojas	Mariana	She killed her husband because he was ill.

=== Additional cast ===
- Armando Torrea ... Raúl Caballero
- Fernando Ciangherotti ... Mario Fernández
- Martin Navarrete... Marcelo Villar
- Wendy de los Cobos ... Susana Fernández
- Verónica Langer ... Rebeca Acuña
- Roxana Chávez ... Sandra Mendoza
- Guillermo Quintanilla ... José Maria Mendoza
- Erick Chapa ... Pablo
- Vanessa Ciangherotti ... Tina Varela
- Lila Avilé ... Carla
- Roberto Montiel ... Reynoso
- Lissete Cuevas ... Matilde
- Fidel Garrida ... Padre Jacinto
- Gerardo Lama ... Ignacio
- Cecilia Romo ... Madre Lourdes
- Pascacio Lopez ... Rios
- Carlos Torres-Torrija ... Polo
- Francisco Porras ... Arevalo
- Rodolfo Arias ... Eduardo Mendoza
