= List of Emperatriz characters =

Emperatriz is a Mexican telenovela produced by Fides Velasco for TV Azteca, a telenovela adapted from Jose Ignacio Cabrujas's Emperatriz (1990 TV series). Gabriela Spanic, who had just signed a contract with TV Azteca in late 2011 portrays the title character.

== Main characters ==
=== Emperatriz Jurado ===
Portrayed by Gabriela Spanic

Emperatriz Jurado is a woman who seeks revenge after realizing that her boyfriend, Armando Mendoza has betrayed her love for many years. Armando and Emperatriz have a daughter, whom Emperatriz unwillingly gave to Armando after her mother, Perfecta, advised her to do so, for the well-being of the child. While trying to destroy Armando, Manuel Leon, Armando's ex-colleague, offers his help to imprison Armando. Manuel wanted Emperatriz to marry him before he gave her proof of Armando's crime. Emperatriz accepted the offer, but they did not consummate their marriage. While tailing Armando, Emperatriz met Alejandro Miranda, Armando's brother-in-law. They immediately fall in love, but Emperatriz does not want to start a relationship with him due to her past. Emperatriz presents the proof of Armando's crime and confronts Alma Rosa, Armando's wife, to identify which one of the three girls is her daughter. Both of them decide not to tell Emperatriz the truth. Before he shot himself, Armando told Elisa to hate Emperatriz forever. Alma Rosa suffered a heart attack and died after confronting Emperatriz. Justo Del Real, Alma Rosa's father swore to make Emperatriz's life impossible since Emperatriz had caused the death of Alma Rosa.

After 8 years away from Mexico, Emperatriz returns, now a successful PR agency owner. She met Alejandro again, this time with a fiancée. As a return of the loss of his daughter, Justo tries everything to separate Emperatriz from her daughter, including building a fake grave of Emperatriz's daughter. Emperatriz believed that her daughter is dead, and now concentrates on pursuing her love, Alejandro. Emperatriz divorces Manuel and confronted with Alejandro's fiancée, Isabel Cristina. Emperatriz befriends her but at the same time trying to gain Alejandro's love. Emperatriz reveals Isabel's secret and successfully gain Alejandro's love. Nevertheless, Esther, Emperatriz daughter, has been in love with Alejandro since her teenage. Emperatriz and Esther feel jealousy towards each other and both of them wanted to have Alejandro. After many obstacles, Emperatriz and Alejandro have successfully become a happy couple. Justo who is unhappy with their relationship wanted to separate both of them in many ways, including sending Emperatriz to jail with the help of Manuel. Elisa, one of Armando's daughter, who has been hating Emperatriz since the death of her parents, works in Emperatriz's agency as a model, to destroy her. When Emperatriz had just found out that her daughter is still alive, she was sent to prison and was accused of fraud in Armando's case.

During her prison days, Emperatriz met La Caimana, an ex-drug dealer. La Caimana made Emperatriz's life impossible by assaulting her. Nevertheless, Emperatriz befriends Lulu. She was released due to insufficient proofs. At the same time, Alejandro was shot in head by Justo. Emperatriz did not know the incident that has caused his memory loss. Emperatriz tries everything to help Alejandro gain his memory back, including abducting Alejandro to a place where both of them had spent together. Alejandro is able to remember something thanks to Emperatriz and realized how Esther had manipulated him. When Emperatriz found out her identity, Elisa claimed that Emperatriz is her mother. Emperatriz wasn't sure but she did felt something common between them. When Elisa was attacked by a psychotic doctor, Emperatriz helped and supported her, although knowing that Elisa might be lying to her.

Alejandro and Emperatriz's love once again tested when Elisa reveals to Emperatriz that Esther, one of her biggest enemy, is her real daughter. Emperatriz decided to end her relationship with Alejandro in order to gain Esther's love. In the same time, Emperatriz found out from Perfecta that her father is none other than another biggest enemy of her life, Justo Del Real. She confronts Justo and wanted him to shoot her. Before pulling the trigger, Emperatriz reveals to Justo that she is his daughter. Justo was proud and happy to have Emperatriz as her daughter and tries many ways to get Emperatriz's trust. Justo destroys Emperatriz's agency so that she would have to turn to him for financial help.

=== Alejandro Miranda ===
Portrayed by Bernie Paz

Alejandro Miranda (Bernie Paz) is a charming lawyer whose marriage to Margarita Del Real ended with her death in an accident. He next meets and falls in love with Emperatriz Jurado (Gabriela Spanic), who rejects him. Eight years later, Alejandro returns to Mexico with his fiancée, Isabel Cristina (Marcela Pezet), and encounters Emperatriz. She decides she now wants to be with Alejandro, so she reveals to him that Isabel was previously a prostitute in Switzerland. Isabel fakes a stroke to keep Alejandro and Emperatriz apart, but Emperatriz manages to expose the ruse. Alejandro and Emperatriz are finally reunited. Margarita's father, Justo Del Real (Sergio Bustamante), loves Alejandro as a son, but Emperatriz is his worst enemy. Unhappy with their relationship, Justo tries everything to separate them, including helping Isabel and blackmailing Emperatriz to leave Alejandro. Alejandro did not give up. Justo soon sees Alejandro as an enemy and shoots him, leaving Alejandro with memory loss. Justo's granddaughter Esther Mendoza Del Real (Adriana Louvier), who has been in love with Alejandro for years, manipulates and takes advantage of him during his amnesia. Emperatriz finally succeeds in helping Alejandro regain his memory, and Alejandro is disappointed with Esther for her trickery. Esther's sister Elisa Mendoza Del Real (Marimar Vega) tells Emperatriz that Esther is her daughter, prompting Emperatriz to end her relationship with Alejandro to gain Esther's love. While Alejandro tries to get Emperatriz back, his ex-girlfriend, Marlene Martinez (Sandra Destenave) joins forces with Manuel Leon (Rafael Sánchez Navarro), Emperatriz's ex-husband, to keep Alejandro and Emperatriz apart.

=== Justo Del Real ===
Portrayed by Sergio de Bustamante.

Justo faked the death of Leonor to take away her wealth. He locked Leonor in a sanitorium and injected her with medication to keep her crazy. Perfecta, whom he raped years ago, helped Leonor. He is very possessive towards his daughters. After the death of Margarita, he makes Alejandro as his son, supporting him to start a new life. He cared for Elisa and Elena but hated Esther Mendoza, Armando and Emperatriz's daughter, who was raised as Alma Rosa's daughter. He was not happy when he found out Armando is still having relationship with Emperatriz. After the death of Alma Rosa, he sworn revenge towards Emperatriz. He separated Emperatriz from Esther by sending Esther to Switzerland. Elisa, his most look-alike granddaughter was not happy with his decision. He was angry with Elisa's words and sent her to Armando's sister, La Gata. He obligate Elena to live with him, so that he would not feel lonely.

He loved Alejandro like his own child. However, Alejandro falls in love with Emperatriz, his worst enemy. Alejandro is converted to his enemy too. He shoot Alejandro in the head, resulting in memory lost. When Esther seek his help to separate Alejandro from Emperatriz, he agreed. At the same time, he realized how much Esther resembled him.

One night, Emperatriz came to find him. Just before he pulled the trigger, Emperatriz revealed that she is her daughter. Justo was proud to see how much Emperatriz resembled him. He wanted to join forces with Emperatriz but Emperatriz rejected his idea. He tried everything to have Emperatriz's trust, including suiciding and makes Emperatriz's agency falls into bankruptcy. Emperatriz still do not fall into his traps.

It was revealed that he locked Armando for 8 years. Armando planned to fake his suicide and tries to run away but was failed by Justo. Agustina, his housekeeper, helped Armando to get away. Agustina shoot herself since Justo did not dare to kill her.

Manuel, his associate his consortium, locked him in the same place where he locked Armando. Manuel later buried him alive. Armando found his coffin, but decided to leave him as a revenge. He died.
