= Héctor Arredondo =

Mexican actor

- Born: Héctor Arredondo Casillas; November 12, 1970; Mexico City, Mexico
- Died: November 16, 2014 (aged 44); Mexico City, Mexico
- Education: Metropolitan Autonomous University
- Occupation: Actor
- Years active: 1995–2014
- Partner: Carla Hernández (2009–2013)
- Children: 2

Héctor Arredondo Casillas (November 12, 1970 – November 16, 2014), was a Mexican television, film and stage actor. He worked with TV Azteca as an actor of telenovelas.

== Personal life and death ==
The actor was romantically linked with actress Carla Hernández, with whom he had his daughter Camila; He also had another daughter, Kia, from a previous relationship.

Arredondo was diagnosed with pancreatic cancer in September 2014. The actor died of the disease on November 16, 2014, four days after his 44th birthday. The news was confirmed by the press Department of Azteca, company with which he collaborated for 13 years.

== Filmography ==
List of acting performances in film and television
Year	Title	Role	Notes
1995	Mochila al hombro	Himself	Host
2001	Lo que callamos las mujeres	Emilio / Roberto / Rufino	Episode: "El Ancla"; Episode: "Una historia de amor" Episode: "Vivir en libertad"
2002	Sin permiso de tus padres		Supporting role
2002	Vivir así	Marcos / Mauricio / Tomás	Episode: "Es amor Toña"; Episode: "Las cartas de Avelina"; Episode: "Lágrimas de cristal"
2002	Por tí	Franco	Supporting role
2001–2002	Lo que es el amor	René	Supporting role
2003–2004	Mirada de mujer, el regreso	Julián	Supporting role
2004	Mesa para tres	Luis Toro	Protagonist
2004–2005	La heredera	Joaquín Mercader	Supporting role
2005	Los plateados	Leonardo Villegas	Supporting role
2006	La última y nos vamos	Adrián	Film
2006–2007	Decisiones	Various roles	10 episodes
2007	Cuando las cosas suceden	Galán	Film
2007–2008	Mientras haya vida	Gael Cervantes	Main antagonist
2008	Cambio de vida		Episode: "La sombra del deseo"
2008	El sexo fuerte	Romulo	TV series
2008	40 días	Andrés	Film
2008–2009	Pobre rico, pobre	Andrés Ferreira / Galindo	Main protagonist
2008–2010	Capadocia	Patrick Lansk	Main cast, 19 episodes
2009–2010	Pobre Diabla	Luciano Enriquez	147 episodes
2011	Viento en contra	Patrick	Film
2011	Ella y el Candidato	Luis Fernando Grama	Film
2012	La Teniente	Capitán Antonio Volante	Main cast, 24 episodes
2013	Secretos de familia	Leonardo Ventura	Co-protagonist
2014–2015	Las Bravo	Gerardo "Gerry" Ibañez	Co-protagonist
2014	Cuatro lunas	Sacerdote	Film
2015	Círculo Perfecto	Javier	Short film

Music videos
Song	Year	Artist
"Maldita timidez"	1999	Lynda Thomas
"Dame Otro Tequila"	2004	Paulina Rubio
