= Cristóbal Lander =

Venezuelan actor and model (born 1977)

- Born: Cristóbal Lander; June 8, 1977 (age 48); Caracas, Venezuela
- Occupations: Actor, Model
- Years active: 2000-present
- Spouse(s): Gaby Espino (2007-2011); Paula Bevilacqua (2013- )
- Children: 3

Cristóbal Lander (born June 8, 1977) is a Venezuelan actor and model.

== Biography ==
Lander became famous after participating in the 2000 Mister Venezuela where he was a finalist.

His first acting role came in 2006 when he starred in the telenovela Por Todo lo Alto playing the character of Rodolfo. A year later, he got another break when he landed the role in the Telemundo TV series, Sin vergüenza.

In 2009 he landed the leading role in the TV series Pobre Diabla in Mexico alongside Alejandra Lazcano.

In 2014, he participated in the telenovela Corazón Esmeralda produced by Venevisión.

== Personal life ==
In 2007, Cristóbal married Venezuelan actress Gaby Espino. In July 2008, their daughter Oriana Lander Espino was born. The couple separated in early 2010, reconciled in November 2010 and divorced in March 2011.

On February 24, 2013, Lander married Venezuelan actress and model Paula Bevilacqua. Their first child, Cristobal Lander Bevilacqua, was born in March 2013, and their second child, a son named Massimo Lander Bevilacqua, was born in August 2015.

== Filmography ==
Television
Year	Title	Role	Notes
2006	Por todo lo alto	Rodolfo	Special Participation
2007	Sin vergüenza	Cristóbal González	Villain
2008	La vida entera	Gustavo	Special Participation
2009-2010	Pobre Diabla	Santiago Rodriguez	Lead Role
2011	El árbol de Gabriel	Agustín Camejo	Villain
2012	Dulce Amargo	Julio César Bueno "JC"	Supporting Role
2014	Corazón Esmeralda	Luis David Montalvo León	Supporting Role
2015	Piel salvaje	Bernardo	Special Participation
2016	Corazón traicionado	Alberto Corona Sotillo	Lead Role
