= Destiny Has No Favorites =

- Theatrical release poster
- Directed by: Alvaro Velarde
- Written by: Alvaro Velarde
- Produced by: Alberto Cappa; Tommaso Fiacchino; Gustavo Sánchez; Alvaro Velarde
- Starring: Mónica Steuer; Javier Valdez; Paul Vega; Celine Aguirre; Angie Cepeda; Bernie Paz
- Cinematography: Micaela Cajahuaringa
- Edited by: Danielle Fillios
- Music by: Irene Vivanco
- Production company: Alvaro Velarde
- Release date: October 16, 2003
- Running time: 90 minutes
- Country: Peru
- Language: Spanish

Destiny Has No Favorites (Spanish: El destino no tiene favoritos) is a 2003 Peruvian romantic comedy film written and directed by Alvaro Velarde.

== Synopsis ==
When Ana's husband rents the garden of his house for the filming of a soap opera, the woman finds herself involved in a production dominated by a power game where blackmail and intrigue prevail.

== Cast ==
The actors participating in this film are:

- Angie Cepeda as María
- Celine Aguirre as Magda
- Tatiana Astengo as Oliva
- Bernie Paz as Alejandro
- Monica Steuer as Ana
- Javier Valdéz as Ernesto
- Paul Vega as Nicolás
- Elena Romero as Virtudes
- Rebeca Ráez as Martina
