= Sin vergüenza (TV series) =

- Genre: Telenovela
- Based on: Entre Medias by Francisca Fuenzalida
- Developed by: Valentina Párraga; Isamar Hernández
- Written by: Luis Zelkowicz; Claudia Rojas
- Directed by: Rodolfo Hoyos; Andrés Biermann
- Starring: Gaby Espino; Ivonne Montero; Margarita Ortega; Paola Toyos
- Composer: Hector Cardona Jr.
- Countries of origin: Colombia; United States
- Original language: Spanish (with English subtitles)
- No. of seasons: 1
- No. of episodes: 86

Production
- Executive producer: Hugo León Ferrer
- Producer: Oscar Guarin
- Production locations: Bogotá, Colombia
- Editor: Jose Luis Varón
- Camera setup: Multi-camera
- Running time: 30-45 minutes
- Production company: RTI Colombia

Original release
- Network: Telemundo
- Release: April 9 – August 24, 2007

Sin vergüenza (Spanish pronunciation: [sim beɾˈɣwensa], No Shame/Shameless) is a Spanish-language telenovela produced by Telemundo and RTI Colombia. It is based on the 2006 Chilean telenovela Entre Medias (In Between). The series stars Gaby Espino, Paola Toyos, Ivonne Montero, and Margarita Ortega.

Telemundo debuted Sin Vergüenza on April 9, 2007, and aired weeknights at 9:30 P.M. ET/PT. After the early weeks received disappointing ratings, it moved to daytime, airing weekdays at 12:30 P.M. ET/PT from June 11 until August 24, 2007.

== Plot ==
Filmed in Bogotá, this steamy serial features four vivacious, sensual and self-willed heroines who share an intense friendship and co-own a lingerie store called Sin Vergüenza. Inseparable since childhood, these passionate women share the most intimate secrets with one another, including romances, adventures and heartaches. Each of them has her own unique personality and seeks love, companionship and fulfillment in a different way. This charming quartet realizes the modern world is not the fairy tale that they dreamed about long ago.

== Cast ==
=== Main ===
Sin's stars

- Gaby Espino as Renata Sepúlveda, an unmarried, childless, upwardly-mobile executive who takes advantage of her affair with her married boss, Raimundo Montes. His wife Meme controls half of their company.
- Ivonne Montero as Maite Contreras, manages the lingerie shop. This fun-loving free spirit who still lives like a teenager—and dates Kike, a much younger man. She also has a mother who won't leave her alone. Her whole life shakes when she discovers her son Vincente (José Julián Gaviria) faces an unexpected illness. Maite must now deal with Max, his father, whom she hasn't seen in eleven years.
- Margarita Ortega as Fernanda Montes, a teacher is Raimundo's sister. She is a devoted mother to two little girls named Isabel and Ana. Fernanda runs into Cristóbal, an old flame who reminds her that the passion has left her marriage. Her husband, Esteban del Río, also works for Raimundo and Meme.
- Paola Toyos as Paloma San Miguel, a bohemian mother who wants to become an art dealer. Her two children are named Roque and Candelaria. Paloma must now choose between her new live-in beau Rafael Velez and her separated husband, Julián.
- Javier Gómez as Raimundo Montes, Meme's husband and father of Paola and Claudio. He is love with Renata.
- Natalia Giraldo as Teresa Contreras, Maite's mother.
- Diana Quijano as Mercedes "Meme" del Solar, Raimundo's wife and mother of Paola and Claudio.
- Salvador del Solar as Julian Gutierrez, an Actor. He is Paloma's ex-husband and father of Roque and Candelaria.
- Alejandro de la Madrid as Rafael Valdezas, Paloma's boyfriend.
- Cristobal Lander as Cristobal Gonzalez, Manuela's father.
- Luis Ernesto Franco as Kike, Maite's ex-boyfriend.
- Alfredo Ahnert as Max Aldana, Grace's ex-husband and father of Vicente and Sara.
- Jose Julian Gaviria as Vicente Contreras, Maite and Max's son.
- Jorge Aravena as Esteban del Rio, Fernanda's husband and father of Ana and Isabel. He is a colleague of Raimundo and Meme.

=== Recurring ===
- Estefania Godoy as Paola Montes, Meme and Raimundo's daughter. She in love with Kike.
- Andres Fierro as Claudio Montes, Meme and Raimundo's son.
- Laila Vieira as Grace de Aldana, Max's ex-wife and mother of Sara.
- Lady Noriega as Silvia, Renata's mother.
- Danilo Santos as Mariano Garcia, a colleague of Meme and father of Matilde.
- Ines Prieto as Ruth, a maid in Paloma's house.
- Ivett Zamora as Nelly, a maid in Fernanda's house.
- Luz Marina Martelo as Clara, Meme's secretary.
- Martha Liliana Calderon as Beatriz Montoya, a Doctor and Matilde's mother. She is an old friend of Grace.
- Juliana Riano
- Martin Galindo
- Valeria Celis
- Valeria Galindo

== Production ==
The series had the working titles: Cuatro Rosas ("Four Roses") and 4 Lives... For Love. Hugo León Ferrer is executive producer. Venezuelan screenwriter Valentina Párraga originally developed the teleplay but dropped out and was replaced by another Venezuelan screenwriter, Isamar Hernández, who made it resemble a story she wrote on early 1990s. The show was directed by Rodolfo Hoyos and Andres Biermann.

== Broadcast ==
On-air promotions for this serial began on Telemundo on March 2, 2007. The network originally announced back in 2006 that the show would join its daytime lineup, airing at 1 p.m. ET/PT, which is where it ultimately wound up. Telemundo originally planned to run 120 original hours from Monday to Friday over about 26 weeks, but the order was apparently cut to 80 hours. Only 14 episodes aired in prime time, three of which were cut to a half hour. Recaps of those shows aired during the first week in daytime. During the initial run, Telemundo broadcast English subtitles as closed captions on CC1, but abruptly dropped them during the afternoon time slot.
