= Tsuria Díaz =

Mexican actress

Tsuria Diaz
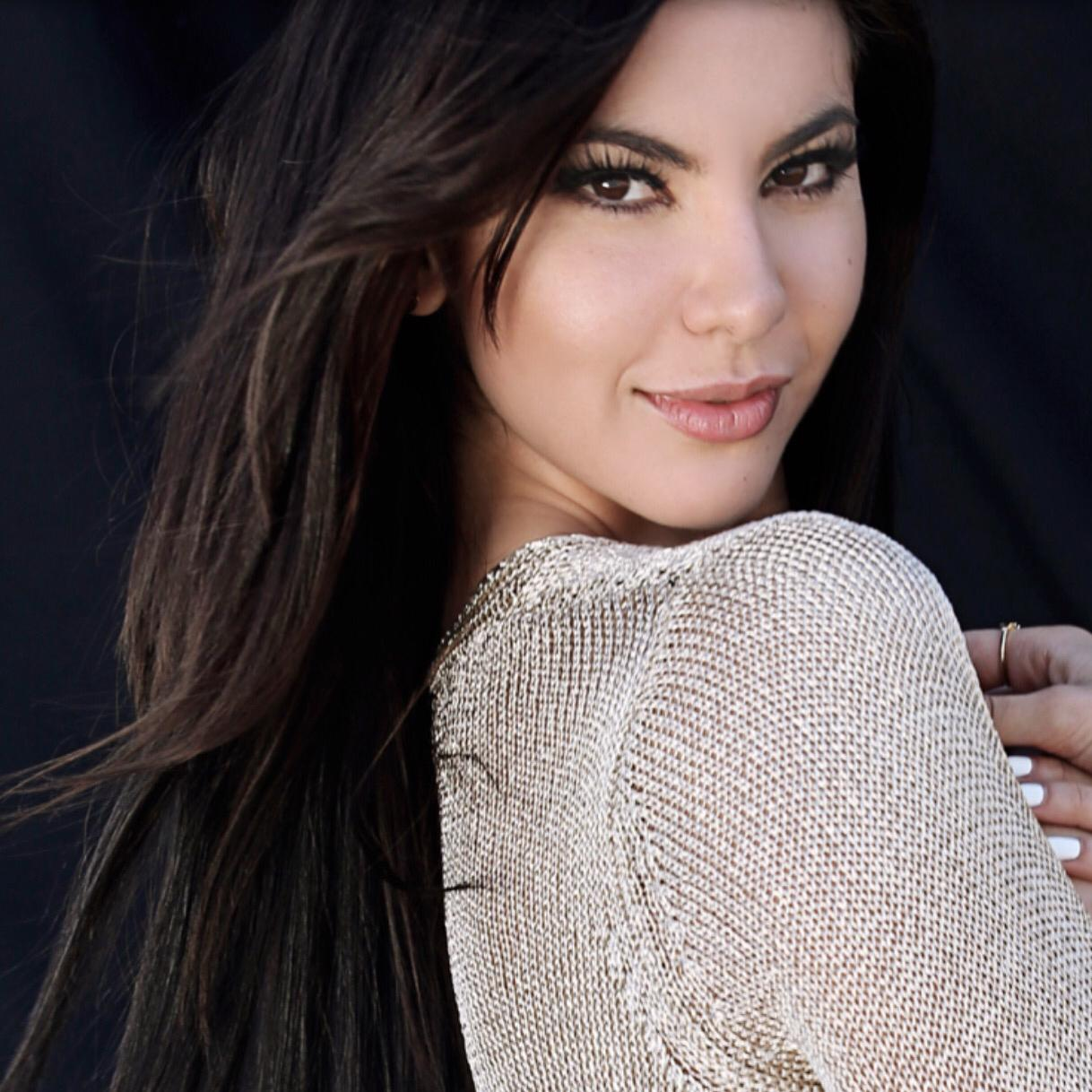
- Born: Tsuria Díaz Bolio Reyes; May 7, 1989 (age 37); Mexico City, Distrito Federal, Mexico
- Occupation: Actress
- Years active: 1998-present
- Website: http://TsuriaDiaz.com

Tsuria Díaz Bolio Reyes (born in Mexico City, Distrito Federal, Mexico, May 7, 1989) is a Mexican actress known as Tsuria Díaz.

== Biography ==
Tsuria at a very early age shows an interest in performance; due to this fact, she begins auditioning and participates in several TV commercials. In 1998 her career officially starts, working as a sports reporter for Canal 5 (XHGC-TV) an open channel in Mexico.

During this period of time, from 2000 to 2004, she continues her participation in different TV commercials. At the same time, she studies acting in Casa Azul, the Argos Comunicación acting academy.

After this shop with Guillermo Rios, she plays the role of Marimar in the play "Perras."

Later in 2008, she antagonizes in the TV series "Me Mueves" as Cristina for Once TV Mexico. In 2011, she studies short acting courses in the Central School of Speech & Drama (CSSD) at the University of London. In the same year, she takes part in the main cast of “El Octavo Mandamiento” as Cecilia Gallardo in an Argos Comunicación production for Cadena Tres, with the Director José Luis García Agraz.

Tsuria Diaz in 2011

In 2012, she is part of the cast in the TV series “La Ruta Blanca” as Rosa, an El Mall production directed by Carlos Garcia Agraz.

The same year, she is part of the main cast “Rosa Diamante” a Telemundo soap opera, with the role of Valeria Sotelo.

In 2014, she studied at Centro de Educación Artística CEA Televisa. In 2015, she participates in the TV show “Como dice el dicho”.

In 2016, she moves to Los Angeles to Stella Adler Studio of Acting.

== Filmography ==
=== Movies ===
Year	Title	Role	Notes
2014	Sueños de Pasión - Una suegra muy ardiente	Bibi Serrano	Film
2014	Casi treinta	Stewardess	Film

=== Television ===
==== Soap operas ====
Year	Title	Role	Producer	Notes
2014	Rosa Diamante	Valeria	Telemundo	
2014	La Ruta Blanca	Rosa	Cadenatres	
2011	El Octavo Mandamiento	Cecilia	Cadenatres	

==== TV Series ====
Year	Title	Role	Producer	Notes
2015-2016	Como dice el dicho	Samantha / Kati / Diana	Televisa	TV-Series
2008	Me mueves	Cristina	Canal 11	TV-Series

== Theater ==
Year	Title	Role	Notes
2006	Perras	María del Mar	
