= Andrea Martí =

Mexican actress (born 1987)

- Born: Andrea Martí Velázquez; August 31, 1987 (age 37); Mexico City, Mexico
- Years active: 2008–present
- Spouse: Kike Karam (m. 2023)

Andrea Martí Velázquez (born 31 August 1987 in Mexico City, Mexico) is a Mexican actress.

== Biography ==
Andrea Martí was born on 31 August 1987 in Mexico City. She started her career in 2008 in the TV series Pobre rico, pobre. Her first lead role was in the 2009 telenovela Mujer comprada, with José Ángel Llamas. In 2012, Martí starred in the soap opera La mujer de Judas, alongside Anette Michel and Víctor González.

== Filmography ==
Television roles
Year	Title	Roles	Notes
2008–2009	Pobre rico, pobre	Ingrid Peláez	
2009–2010	Mujer comprada	Angélica Valdez	
2010–2011	Prófugas del destino	Beatriz "Bety" Torres / Sor María	139 episodes
2012	La mujer de Judas	Natalia Leal	165 episodes
2013–2014	Prohibido amar	Olga Ramírez	
2014–2015	Las Bravo	Lucía de Martínez	
2016–2017	La querida del Centauro	Bibiana Taborda	14 episodes
2016–2020	La Doña	Regina Sandoval	187 episodes
2017–2018	La hija pródiga	Pamela Montejo	13 episodes
2024	Lotería del crimen	Azul	Episode: "La Vampiro"
2024	El Conde: Amor y honor	Amaranta	

== Sources ==
- Andrea Martí at IMDb
