= Vidas robadas (Mexican TV series) =

- Also known as: Stolen Lives; Infamia; Torn Apart
- Created by: Jorge Maestro
- Directed by: Martin Barraza; Carlos Guerra
- Starring: Christian Bach; Andrés Palacios; Alma Delfina; Pedro Sicard; José Alonso; Carla Hernández
- Opening theme: "Entre La Espalda y La Pared" Performed by Armando Manzanero "Aun Existe El Amor" Performed by Agustin Argüello, Menny Carrasco, Napoleon Robleto & Sebastian Martingaste
- Country of origin: Mexico
- Original language: Spanish
- No. of episodes: 141

Production
- Executive producer: Emilia Lamothe
- Producer: Mónica Skorlich
- Production location: Mexico City
- Editors: Ma Go; Alejandra Espinosa
- Camera setup: Multi-camera
- Running time: 42 minutes

Original release
- Network: Azteca Trece
- Release: 8 March – 21 September 2010

Related
- Mujer comprada; Prófugas del destino

Vidas robadas is a Spanish-language telenovela produced by the Mexican television network TV Azteca. It is internationally known as Infamia. It stars Carla Hernandez, Andres Palacios, and marks the return of the grand actress, Cristian Bach to the television screen.

== Cast ==
=== Main casts ===
Protagonists

- Christian Bach...María Julia Echeverría de Fernández-Vidal - Main Villain / Maria Emilia Echeverría Ruiz
- Carla Hernández...Luz Herrera / Camila Fernández Vidal - Main Heroine / Secondary Villain
- Andrés Palacios...Martin Sandoval Main Hero

Special participation

- Alma Delfina...Aurora Sandoval
- Pedro Sicard...José Enrique Fernández Vidal (Villain)
- José Alonso...Antonio Fernández Vidal
- Luis Felipe Tovar...Ángel Cordero (Villain)
- Martha Cristiana...Isabel Fernández Vidal
- Bernie Paz...Joan Manuel

=== Secondary casts ===
- Eduardo Arroyuelo...Marcelo
- Daniel Elbittar...Javier Villafañe (Villano)
- Sergio Bonilla...Juan
- Lupita Sandoval...Saturnina
- Luis Ernesto Franco...Francisco
- Amara Villafuerte...Paula
- Rodolfo Arias...Padre Adolfo
- María de la Fuente...Lorena
- Victor Civeira...Filiberto
- Paloma Quezada...Rosa Maria
- Luis Alberto López..Pablo
- Julieta Grajales..Nora
- Gabriel Casanova
- Luis Romano
- Ricardo Tico....Pedro Antonio Fernández Vidal (Asesinado por Maria Julia)
- Stefania Gómez
- Paulina Washington
- Mayte Fierro
- Mariana Villegas
- Carlos Padilla
- Andree Ascencio
- David Ortega
- Josefo Rodríguez
- Jorge Aldama
- Daniela Menchaca
- Juan Menchaca
- Juan Fernando Haro
- Raul Adalid
- Angeles Alonso
- Maribel Rodríguez
- Maria Elena Olivares
- Javier Escobar...El Velas (Asesinado por Maria Julia y José Enrique)
- Gabriel Pascual
- Diego Rafel Euan Euan
- Angel Gabriel Euan Euan
- Carmen Delgado

== Broadcast ==
Country	Alternate title/Translation	TV network(s)	Series premiere	Series finale	Weekly schedule	Timeslot	Official Website
Malaysia	Infamia	Astro Bella; Mustika HD	November 24, 2012		Monday through Friday	11:00pm	
UK	Torn Apart	Drama	July 8, 2013		Monday through Friday	11:00pm	
