= Dos lagos =

- Genre: Drama
- Based on: Lightfields by David Schulner
- Written by: Adrian Mazoy
- Directed by: Conrado Martínez/Roberto González
- Creative director: Anuart Martínez
- Country of origin: Mexico
- Original language: Spanish
- No. of seasons: 1
- No. of episodes: 12

Production
- Executive producers: Benjamín Salinas; Roberto González
- Camera setup: Multi-camera
- Running time: 60 minutes
- Production companies: Televisión Azteca; 20th Century Fox

Original release
- Network: Televisión Azteca
- Release: November 9 – December 14, 2017

Dos lagos is a Mexican horror drama television series produced by Televisión Azteca and Fox. Based on the British television series created by David Schulner, entitled Lightfields. The show is produced by Roberto González and Benjamín Salas and written by Adriana Soid. The series premiered on November 9, 2017, and concluded on December 17, 2017.

== Cast ==
- Matías Novoa as David Laborde
- Cecilia Piñeiro as Marta Ramírez de De la Garza
- Fernando Becerril as Pedro de la Garza Ramírez
- Karla Rico as Viviana Arroyo
- Carlos André as Child Pedro de la Garza Ramírez
- Fátima Valentina as Child Viviana Arroyo
- Germán Valdés as Young Tomás
