= Pobre rico, pobre =

Mexican telenovela

- Starring: Cinthia Vázquez; Héctor Arredondo; Patricia Vásquez; Victor Garcia; Patricia Bernal; Luis Felipe Tovar; América Gabriel; Andrea Marti; Plutarco Haza
- Country of origin: Mexico
- Original language: Spanish
- No. of seasons: One
- No. of episodes: 190

Production
- Executive producer: José Solano
- Producer: Carlos Márquez
- Production location: Mexico City
- Running time: 60 minutes

Original release
- Network: TV Azteca
- Release: April 21, 2008 – January 9, 2009

Related
- Tengo Todo Excepto a Ti; Eternamente Tuya

Pobre Rico Pobre is a Mexican telenovela, based on the Colombian telenovela Nuevo rico, nuevo pobre. The show started 21 April 2008.

== Plot ==
The comedy deals with the life of Andrés Ferreira and Brayan Galindo, from rich and poor families respectively. A mistake was made when they were born, because Andrés, originally of the poor family, was given to the rich family, and Brayan of the rich family went with the poor family. 30 years later the nurse who made the mistake reveals the truth to the families, and Brayan goes to live with the rich family, and Andres goes with the poor family.

== Cultural aspects ==
The name of Brayan Galindo reflects an irregular adaptation of Brian to the Spanish, just as Rosmery is adapted from the original Rosemary. It reflects the fact that many Latin Americans adopt foreign names thinking that it is an indication of socioeconomic status.

Andrés is portrayed as a very arrogant person, who gives no vacations on Christmas to his employees and ignores his mother's advice. So his mother wants to give a lesson to Andrés by exchanging Brayan's and Andrés' roles. During this event Andrés falls in love with Rosmery while Brayan breaks his relationship with her because he has begun an affaire with María Fernanda, a super-model fortune-hunter who was Andrés' girlfriend.

The social consequences of massive dismissals of 200 employees as result of a reconstruction inserts a dramatic effect in the plot, and contribute to create a cold image of the enterprise world and Andrés Ferreira.

== Cast ==
- Héctor Arredondo - Andrés Ferreira
- Cinthia Vázquez - Rosmery Peláez
- Patricia Vásquez - Fernanda San Miguel
- Victor Garcia - Brayan Galindo
- Patricia Bernal - Antonia Vda. de Ferreira
- Luis Felipe Tovar - Leónidas Galindo
- América Gabriel - Maritza Buenahora
- Andrea Marti - Ingrid Peláez
- Plutarco Haza - Maximiliano López Ferreira.
