= Cecilia Piñeiro =

Hispanic-Mexican television actress and model

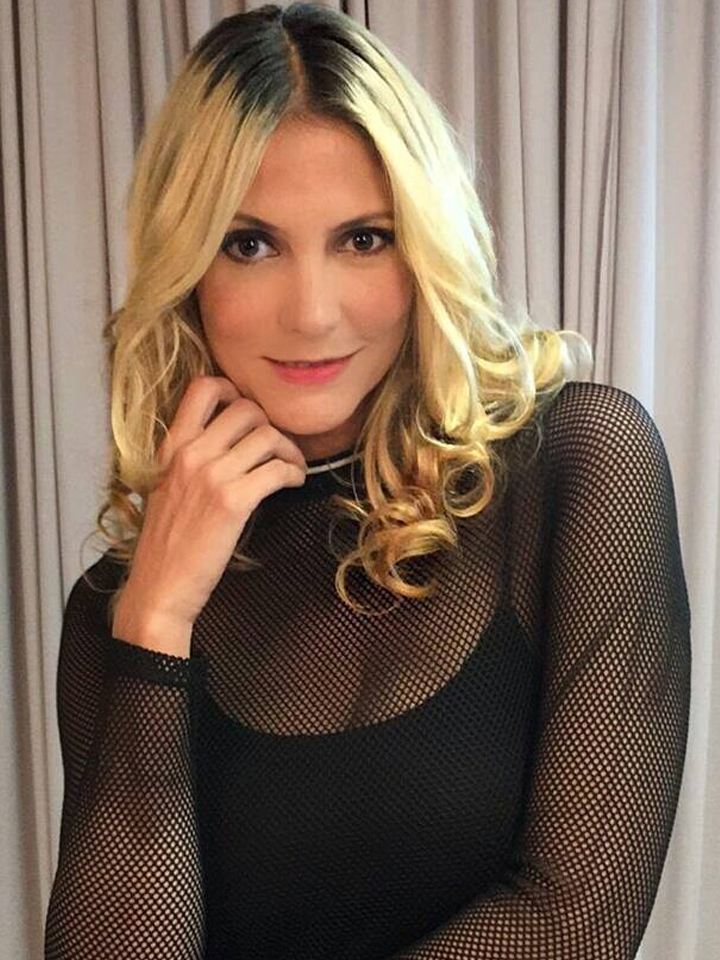
- Born: Mexico
- Other name: Ceci Piñeiro
- Occupation: Actress
- Website: www.ceciliapineiro.com.mx/

Cecilia Piñeiro is a Hispanic-Mexican television actress and model. She has been featured in television programs including Un nuevo amor (2003), La Heredera (2004), Amor en custodia (2005), and Mujer comprada (2009).

== Television ==
- Un nuevo amor (2003) ..... Deborah Luján
- Mirada de mujer, el regreso (2003) .....
- La Heredera (2004) ..... Lucía
- Amor en custodia (2006) ..... Priscila
- Amores Cruzados (2006) ..... Laura
- Se busca un hombre (2007) ..... Leticia
- Mujer comprada (2009) ..... Jenny Laborde
- Entre el amor y el deseo (2010/11) ..... Lucía de la Garza de Lins / Lucía de la Garza de Toledo
- A cada quien su santo (2010)
- Drenaje profundo (2011) ..... Celia
- La Mujer de Judas (2012) ..... Narda Briseño
- La otra cara del alma (2012) ..... Sofía Durán
- Hombre tenías que ser (2013) ..... Minerva Campos
- Las Bravo (2014) ..... Virginia "Vicky" Ibáñez de Villaseñor
- Dos lagos (2017) - Marta de la Garza

== Awards and nominations ==
=== San Judas de Oro ===
San Judas de Oro are awards that were given to the telenovela La Mujer de Judas 2012.

Category	Result
More shocking death	Nominated
Best slap	Winner
Best villain of the year	Winner
