= Cristina Michaus =

Mexican actress, playwright, director and activist

- Born: September 9, 1961 (age 64); Mexico
- Occupations: Actress, activist, playwright, director
- Years active: 1976–present
- Notable work: Mujeres de Ciudad Juárez, De la calle, El tigre de Santa Julia
- Awards: Ariel Award for Best Supporting Actress (2001), FONCA Fellowship (2002, 1994), Cuauhtemoc award (1998)

Cristina Michaus (born September 9, 1961) is a Mexican actress, playwright, and film director.

== Career ==
Cristina Michaus began her artistic career in 1976 and studied acting at the Universidad Veracruzana.

Early in her career, Michaus performed at the Teatro Blanquita, sharing the stage with performers from the Golden Age of Mexican cinema, such as Blanca Guerra and Adalberto Martínez "Resortes". She later acted alongside Daniel Giménez Cacho in Sexo, pudor y lágrimas and Luis Fernando Peña in the feature film De la calle.

=== Theatre ===
During the 1980s and 1990s, Michaus acted in classical plays such as The Great Theatre of the World by Pedro Calderón de la Barca and Oedipus Rex by Sophocles, the latter produced by the National Theatre Company of the Instituto Nacional de Bellas Artes. She also starred in contemporary plays including Rosa de dos aromas and Sexo, pudor y lágrimas, the latter of which was adapted into a successful film following its popularity on stage. Her work as an actress and director is credited in more than 30 productions in Mexico according to the Registro de la Escena Mexicana.

==== Theatrical criticism ====
In Oedipus Rex, she "displays a maternal eroticism that is the passion of Jocasta". Her portrayal of Adela in The House of Bernarda Alba was described by critic Malkah Rabell as performed “with vigor and dramatic insight.” Rabell also called Michaus' adaptation of El apando “more infernal than Revueltas'” and her direction “so intensely realistic that one could almost smell the stifling air from the stage.”

=== Film and television ===
In cinema, Michaus has often portrayed marginalized and transgressive women. Her most recognized film role is that of Tomasa in El tigre de Santa Julia (2002). In De la calle, she played La Seño, a drug dealer. In De ida y vuelta she portrayed a sex worker. Rafael Aviña placed these roles within the lineage of tragic female characters in classic Mexican cinema in his book Cabaret, rumberas y pecadoras en el cine mexicano… ayer y hoy.

She has also appeared in television series, such as portraying Doña Esperanza, the mother of El Chapo in the eponymous Netflix series, and in Mujeres asesinas.

== Activism ==
After 20 years in acting, Michaus co-founded the production company Tenzin and the civil association Barriocinema. Through these, she has produced plays and short films addressing issues such as gender-based violence, domestic violence, social justice, and human rights. Her work combines theatre and cinema with social awareness campaigns—a method she refers to as "artivism".

One of her main themes is the femicides in Ciudad Juárez. She traveled there to investigate, direct, and co-produce the documentary Juárez: desierto de esperanza. She collected thousands of signatures demanding justice from both the Mexican government and the United Nations Human Rights Council, which she delivered personally in New York. Michaus also helped organize mass protests in Mexico City’s Zócalo against violence toward women.

In 2002, she wrote and performed the monologue Mujeres de Ciudad Juárez. After over 200 performances in Mexico, it was translated into English and adapted by Jimmy A. Noriega. The English version was performed by multiple actresses and presented at universities across the U.S., as well as international festivals in Colombia, Belgium, Greece, and India. As of 2022, the monologue is the subject of academic studies on theatre and gender-based violence.

In 2004, Michaus co-produced and co-directed the documentary ¿Te digo un secreto?, featuring testimonies of women who had taken refuge in domestic violence shelters. The film and other selected short films were presented in the Zócalo and in marginalized neighborhoods - often in the same communities where the films were made - covering topics such as violence, addiction, and reproductive health.

Between 2017 and 2018, Michaus co-wrote and performed the monologue Con don de decidir, aimed at preventing teenage pregnancies. It was presented to more than 20,000 secondary school students in partnership with state governments including those of Baja California Sur and Tlaxcala.

She also co-wrote the anti-violence stand-up piece Pásele marchanta in 2006, produced with support from Mexico City’s government. The show was later staged in Hermosillo and again in Mexico City as part of Las Tandas del Círculo Teatral, raising funds for the educational project led by Alberto Estrella, and performed alongside fellow activist actors such as Alma Muriel and Ofelia Medina.

== Stage work ==
- Mujeres de Ciudad Juárez: author, co-producer, co-director, and actress.
- Con don de decidir: author, producer, director, and actress.
- Pásele marchanta: co-author, co-producer, co-director, and actress.
- Tiempos furiosos: actress.
- Sexo, pudor y lágrimas: actress.
- Rosa de dos aromas: actress.
- El gran teatro del mundo: actress.
- Edipo Rey: actress.
- La casa de Bernarda Alba: actress.
- Apando: director.
- Bajo el silencio: director.
- Sor Juana en el SPA (2011): author and director.

== Filmography ==
=== Film ===
- De la calle (2001), as La Seño.
- Sin dejar huella (2000), as Lolis.
- De ida y vuelta (2000), as Sex worker.
- El tigre de Santa Julia (2002), as Tomasa Rojo.
- Corazones rotos (2001), as Diana.
- Historia de una pasión (2011), as Carmela.
- La mina de oro (2011), as the murderous woman.

=== Television and series ===
- El Chapo (2017–2018), as Doña Esperanza (El Chapo’s mother) – seasons 1, 2, and 3.
- Somos oro (2024), as Miss Jose.
- Mujeres asesinas (2008) – episode "Mónica, acorralada".

=== Documentaries ===
- Juárez: Desierto de esperanza (2022), co-producer and co-director.
- ¿Te digo un secreto? (2004), co-producer and co-director.

== Awards ==
- Ariel Award for Best Supporting Actress for De la calle (2001).
- Ariel nomination for Best Supporting Actress for Sin dejar huella (2000).
- Ariel nomination for Best Supporting Actress for De ida y vuelta (2000).
- 2002 grant recipient of the Fondo Nacional para la Cultura y las Artes (FONCA) in the theatre performance category, awarded for her 25-year career and work on the Ciudad Juárez femicides.
- 1998 Cuauhtémoc Art Prize for the play Rosario o el desencanto de la patria.
- 1994 grant recipient of the Fondo Nacional para la Cultura y las Artes for the creation of a solo multidisciplinary performance on the theme of Woman and Homeland.
- Regarding Mujeres de Ciudad Juárez:
  - Published by the National Council for Culture and the Arts and the Instituto Nacional de Bellas Artes in the academic anthology Hotel Juárez: Dramaturgia de feminicidios (2008).
  - The English version, Women of Ciudad Juárez, directed by Jimmy Noriega, received a Kennedy Center award at the American College Theater Festival in 2015 for "Making Theatre an Important Catalyst for Social Political Change".

== See also ==
- Femicides in Ciudad Juárez
- Ariel Award
