= La Teniente =

- Genre: Drama
- Created by: Benjamín Salinas; Roberto González
- Written by: Marcelo Tobar (head writer); Ana Romero; Nacho Cabana; Alejandro Gerber Bicecci; Rodrigo Ordoñez; Adrián Mazoy
- Directed by: Jorge Luquín; Conrado Martínez; Álvaro Curiel; Diego Muñoz
- Starring: María Fernanda Yepes; Matías Novoa; Héctor Arredondo; Armando Torrea; Fernando Sarfatti; Sylvia Saenz; Luis Cárdenas; Jorge Luis Vázquez
- Music by: Jorge Gebel; Bernardo Castro
- Country of origin: Mexico
- Original language: Spanish
- No. of seasons: 1
- No. of episodes: 24

Production
- Executive producers: Benjamín Salinas; Roberto González
- Producer: Horacio Díaz Morales
- Production locations: Veracruz, Veracruz, Mexico; Acapulco, Guerrero, Mexico; Quintana Roo, Mexico
- Cinematography: Javier Morón; Jero Rod-García; Carlos Aguilera; Daniel Jacobs; Pablo Reyes
- Editors: Paulo Carballar; Verónica López Escalona; Luisa María Martínez Arcaraz; Mauricio Sariñana; David Aragón; López Carlos
- Camera setup: Multi-camera
- Production company: TV Azteca

Original release
- Network: Azteca 7
- Release: September 24 – November 1, 2012

La Teniente is a Mexican drama television series premiered on Azteca 7 on September 24, 2012, and concluded on November 1, 2012. The series is created and produced by Benjamín Salinas and Roberto González for Azteca 7 and distributed by Comarex and TV Azteca Internacional. It stars María Fernanda Yepes as the titular character.

== Plot ==
The series relates the events which occur to a special forces squad of the Marina Armada Mexicana, in which Lieutenant Roberta Ballesteros —who graduated with highest honours from the military academy— must prove that she is as capable as her male colleagues. It centres around the challenges she encounters upon joining the elite unit, and the emotional aftermath of tragedy which befalls the group. The series follows her integration into the unit, which is full of drama, action, valour, and close relationships. The stories often reflect real‑world challenges faced by the Mexican Navy — such as arresting drug traffickers and human traffickers, disasters, superstition, politics, and corruption.

== Cast ==
=== Main ===
- María Fernanda Yepes as Teniente Roberta Ballesteros
- Matías Novoa as Teniente Nicolás Alejo
- Héctor Arredondo as Capitán Antonio Volante
- Armando Torrea as Teniente Adán Peña
- Fernando Sarfatti as Comodoro Francisco Reygadas
- Sylvia Saenz as Teniente Luz "Lucy" Idalia Contreras
- Luis Cárdenas as Almirante Torreblanca
- Jorge Luis Vázquez as Teniente de Navío Alexis Madariaga

=== Recurring ===
- Citlali Galindo as Marta
- Germán Valdés III as Pedro Volante
- León Peraza as Teniente Héctor Ramos
- Coral de la Vega as Marisol
- Raúl Aranda-Lee as Contraalmirante De La Barquera
- Hugo Catalán as Javier Guerrero
- Anna Ciocchetti as Esmeralda
- Víctor González as Teniente Juan Alejo
- Javier Díaz Dueñas as Vicealmirante Facundo Ballesteros
- Juan Martín Jauregui as Bruno Santoscoy
