= Pedro Sicard =

Mexican actor

- Born: Pedro Luis Sicard Sánchez
- Years active: 1993 – present

Pedro Luis Sicard Sánchez is a Mexican actor.

== Filmography ==
=== Telenovelas ===
- Las Bravo - Samuel Robles
- Entre el Amor y el Deseo - Rafael Valdivieso
- Vidas robadas (2010) - Jose Enrique
- Secretos del Alma (2008) - Santiago Alcázar
- Cambio de Vida (2007) - Daniel Betanzos
- Montecristo (2006) - Luciano
- Machos (2005) - Alonso Mercader
- Las Juanas (2004) - Juan de Dios
- Dos chicos de cuidado en la ciudad (2003) - Jose Luis
- La duda (2002) - Arturo
- El País de las mujeres (2002) - Vicente
- Como en el cine (2001) - Daniel
- Primer amor... a mil por hora (2000) - Claudio
- La usurpadora (1998)
- Lucy Crown (1987)

=== TV series ===
- Decisiones (2006) - Julio/Ernesto
- Ni una vez más (2005)
- La Vida es una Canción (2004)
- Vivir Asi (2001; 2004)
- Lo que Callamos las Mujeres (2002)

=== Movies ===
- Días Salvajes (2008) - Miguel
- Lo que la Gente Cuenta (2007) - Alan
- Corazones Rotos (2001) - Billy
- Antes que Anochezca (1999)
- La Bolsa o la Vida (1999)
- Mujer Transparente (1988)
- Una Novia para David (1986)
