= Raúl Olivo =

Venezuelan actor, model and singer

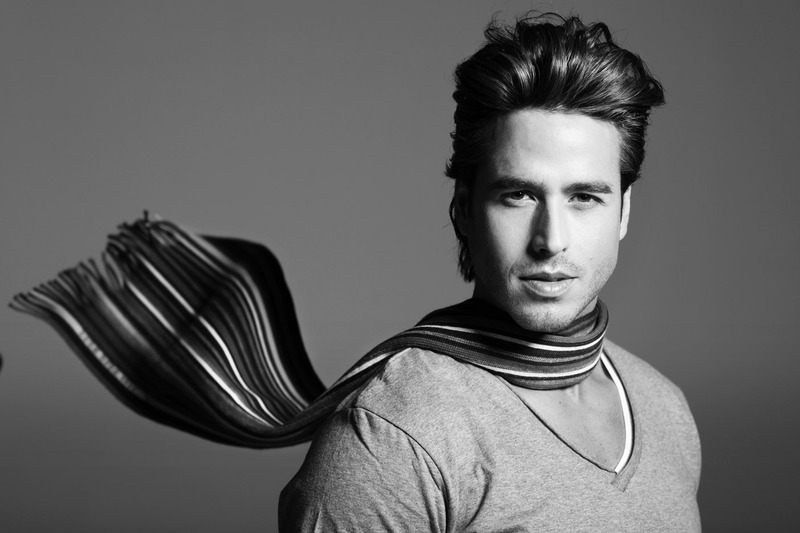
Raul Olivo

Raul Olivo is an actor and singer from Venezuela. His first steps in the entertainment industry made him stand out as a model in international runways for worldwide recognized brands such as Hugo Boss, Armani, Calvin Klein, Tommy Hilfiger, Jockey, Polar, Pepsi, Coca-Cola, Ford and Vertigo, among others. Later on, he began his acting career and had the opportunity to participate in several television productions such as Angel Rebelde (USA 2004), Si me amas mata a mi marido (Colombia 2007), Con los hombres no hay manera (Decisiones – Colombia 2007), Acorralada (USA 2008), Isla Paraíso (USA – webnovela 2008), Todo por Amor (USA – webnovela 2009) and Amor Comprado (USA – 2009). Additionally, he has participated in films such as Tocando Fondo (Venezuela – 2008) and The longest minute of my life (Madrid – 2009).

His music and acting studies include renowned academies such as Corazza Estudio (Madrid), Centro de Estudio Actoral CEA (México), Lesly Khan (Los Angeles), Vocal Power (Los Angeles), Curso Intensivo Actoral Alina Rodríguez (México) and Centro Integral de Formación Actoral Luz Columba - CIFALC (Miami). Additionally, he has a bachelor's degree in Business Administration.

Recognized twice by People en Español magazine as one of the 25 sexiest bachelors, this artist also has a passion for martial arts, kickboxing and karate (Wado Ryu style), achieving important awards and recognitions, and becoming internal kickboxing champion in Venezuela and second in karate's World Championship.

Most recently, his focus has been the launch of his first musical production “Mi Forma de Vivir”, having great acceptance among his fans. Some of the songs are: “Te Prometí”, “Don’t You Know”, “Mi Forma de Vivir”, “Cambiarme por él”, “Enamorado” and “Sin Darnos Cuenta”, which have been climbing positions at the prestigious music site Reverbnation after just a few days of being released.

== Filmography ==
=== Film ===
Year	Title	Role	Notes
2008	Tocando fondo	Unknown role	Short film

=== Television ===
Year	Title	Role	Notes
2004	Ángel rebelde	Alvaro	Television debut
2007-2008	Acorralada	Emilio Linares	Supporting role
2008	Amor comprado	Enrique Rodríguez	
2014	La virgen de la calle	Manolo Pérez	Main cast
2015	Que te perdone Dios	Motor	
2018	La bella y las bestias	Jorge	17 Episodes
