= Marchlands =

2011 British television drama series

- Created by: David Schulner
- Developed by: Gallowgate Productions & 20th Century Fox Television
- Written by: Stephen Greenhorn
- Directed by: James Kent
- Starring: Jodie Whittaker; Denis Lawson; Tessa Peake-Jones; Jamie Thomas King; Alex Kingston; Dean Andrews; Anne Reid; Shelley Conn
- Country of origin: United Kingdom
- Original language: English
- No. of series: 1
- No. of episodes: 5

Production
- Producer: Chrissy Skinns
- Running time: 60 minutes (w/advertisements)
- Production companies: ITV Studios; 20th Century Fox Television

Original release
- Network: ITV
- Release: 3 February – 3 March 2011

Related
- Lightfields (2013)

Marchlands is a British television series developed from the American television drama pilot The Oaks, written and created by David Schulner, and broadcast on ITV in 2011.

A follow-up series, Lightfields, was broadcast in 2013. Each five-episode series explores the lives of three families, occupying the same house in different time periods, which is haunted by a restless spirit.

== Plot ==
In 1968, Ruth and Paul Bowen reside in Marchlands, a house in a fictional Yorkshire village, along with Paul's parents Robert and Evelyn. Six months earlier, their daughter Alice drowned in an apparent accident. However, Ruth suspects there is more to Alice's death and is determined to uncover the truth.

In 1987, Helen and Eddie Maynard rent Marchlands with their two children. They soon discover that their daughter Amy has an imaginary friend named Alice, which they initially dismiss. However, after a series of suspiciously paranormal events, Amy blames Alice for the death of a kitten. Concerned, Helen and Eddie take Amy for medical tests.

In 2010, Mark Ashburn and his pregnant partner Nisha Parekh move into Marchlands and discover a photo of a young girl whom the audience recognizes as Alice. Nisha grows suspicious that Mark has not been fully honest about their reason for moving. Meanwhile, elderly Ruth, who never accepted her child's death, returns to Marchlands when Mark hires her as a housekeeper and childminder after Nisha breaks her ankle falling from a step-ladder.

== Production ==
The series was filmed on location in and around London, as well as on the Ashridge Estate, the village of Aldbury, and the surrounding village of Little Gaddesden. The house in which the main part of the story was filmed is in Tadworth, Surrey. Marchlands marks the first commission to come from the creative collaboration between ITV & Twentieth Century Fox. The Oaks writer David Schulner was heavily involved in the series' commission.

== Characters ==
=== 1968 ===
- Ruth Bowen (Jodie Whittaker). Grieving for her eight-year-old daughter Alice who drowned six months previously, she senses she has been misled on the cause of Alice's death.
- Robert Bowen (Denis Lawson). Local mill owner Robert, the grandfather of Alice. As Alice was in his care when she died, he was the last to see Alice; his daughter-in-law questions him a lot about how she died and that is extremely difficult for him.
- Evelyn Bowen (Tessa Peake-Jones). Married to Robert and living with her son Paul and daughter-in-law Ruth, Evelyn appears to be the most pragmatic member of the family. Wanting to move on from the loss of Alice, she believes her daughter-in-law's continual questions aren't helpful. Although Evelyn isn't fully aware of the cause of Alice's death, she has her own secrets.
- Paul Bowen (Jamie Thomas King). Paul is the accounts manager at the local mill, owned by his father Robert. He finds his marriage to Ruth under pressure as they both struggle to cope with their grief in different ways.
- Liz Runcie (Jennifer Hennessy). Mother of Olive and lives next door to Marchlands, she is also friends with Ruth.
- Alice Bowen (Millie Archer). Alice died in mysterious circumstances in November 1967. She has a spiritual presence in Marchlands many years after her death.

=== 1987 ===
- Helen Maynard (Alex Kingston). Housewife Helen Maynard rents Marchlands with her husband Eddie, a supervisor in a saw mill. They live with their two children, Scott and Amy. When daughter Amy claims to be communicating with the spirit of a young girl, Helen sends her for psychiatric tests rather than believe her story.
- Eddie Maynard (Dean Andrews). Eddie works as the supervisor at the local saw mill. He is more sympathetic towards Amy's claims that she is communicating with a spirit and is prepared to listen to anything she says. Eddie is reluctant to send Amy for medical tests but agrees to it to keep the peace.
- Scott Maynard (Ethan Griffin). Son of Helen and Eddie, he believes sister Amy is seeking attention by claiming to be communicating with the dead. He shows no sympathy towards Amy, preferring to taunt and ridicule her about her story.
- Amy Maynard (Sydney Wade). Daughter of Helen and Eddie, she claims to be communicating with the spirit of a dead girl, Alice. Her family prefer to believe she may have a medical condition rather than believe she is communicating with the dead.
- Mark Ashburn (Ryan Prescott). Mark works in Olive's garden and he falls in love with her and is friends with Scott.
- Olive Runcie (Sophie Stone). She lives next door to Marchlands with her mother, Liz. She has a crush on Mark.
- Older Liz Runcie (Jennifer Hennessy). Mother of Olive and lives next door to Marchlands.

=== 2010 ===
- Nisha Parekh (Shelley Conn). Nisha is pregnant when she moves to Marchlands to live in the village where her fiancé Mark grew up. Nisha begins to feel the presence of a little girl who used to live in the house. Initially comforted by the connection to the past, she gradually begins to feel lonely, isolated from Mark and the spookiness of the house becomes unnerving, especially when the baby is born.
- Older Mark Ashburn (Elliot Cowan). Mark returns to his former village after several years away. Mark was persuaded to return to his home village by partner Nisha, as she feels it will be the perfect place to raise a child.
- Older Ruth Bowen (Anne Reid). Ruth returns to Marchlands in 2010 when she is employed as a housekeeper by Mark, after Nisha has a setback when falling from a step ladder. Many years after the death of her daughter Alice, Ruth is still as determined as ever to find out the truth about what really happened to her.
- Older Olive Runcie (Elizabeth Rider). Olive is Mark's young love who has lived next door to Marchlands for her whole life. She is keeping a secret but what is it?
- Older Scott Maynard (Daniel Casey). The corner shop owner. Scott is reluctant to talk about the events that happened to his family when he lived in Marchlands and Nisha often goes to the corner shop and asks about what Mark was like when he lived in the village, but he is reluctant to say.

== Episodes ==
No.	Title	Directed by	Written by	Original release date	UK viewers (millions)
1	"Episode 1"	James Kent	Stephen Greenhorn	3 February 2011	7.36
In 1968, Ruth and Paul Bowen mourn the death by drowning of their eight-year-old daughter Alice in the woods around their rural house, Marchlands. Ruth believes Paul blames her and is distant from her, but both of them ally against his mother Evelyn when she suggests that Alice's bedroom be turned into a sewing room. Nineteen years later, Helen and Eddie Maynard now live in the house and are troubled when their little girl Amy tells them that a ghost called Alice is her imaginary friend, more so when Amy's pet cat is killed, supposedly by Alice. In 2010, expectant Nisha and her partner, local boy Mark, have bought the house. Decorating the planned nursery, Nisha finds a photo of Alice and a strange mural. She meets the Maynards' son, Scott, now in his thirties, and the village shop keeper but finds Mark evasive after seeing him communicate with deaf villager Olive Runcie.
2	"Episode 2"	James Kent	Stephen Greenhorn	10 February 2011	6.75
Evelyn persuades Paul and a reluctant Ruth to seek help from a priest, Father Boyle, but his main argument, that the couple should try for another child, does not comfort Ruth. Seeing Alice's crucifix on her headstone prompts Ruth to ask for a police investigation, but again she gets no satisfaction. Helen and Eddie take Amy to see a psychiatrist, on whose advice they read up on mental disorders, but to Amy, Alice is only too real, complete with hand prints, and Amy becomes annoyed with her 'friend' for getting her into trouble. Laid up with a broken leg, Nisha discovers physical evidence of Alice having lived in the house as well as hearing ghostly noises. Mark advertises for someone to come and help and the advert is answered by Ruth.
3	"Episode 3"	James Kent	Stephen Greenhorn	17 February 2011	6.93
In 1968, Ruth and Paul are told that his low sperm count makes it unlikely they will have other children. Upset, Ruth leaves the village and meets some students, with whom she gets stoned at a party, though she turns down the offer of sex with a lad called Brian. Eddie becomes more and more convinced as he talks to Amy that Alice is indeed a ghost and not an imaginary friend, locating news of her death in the local library archive. In 2010, Nisha gives birth to a daughter, whom she names Alice. Ruth stays on to help and hears evidence of a poltergeist. Scott tells Nisha that, in his teens, Mark had a fling with Olive Runcie, who would seem to be an elective mute, speaking when it suits her.
4	"Episode 4"	James Kent	Stephen Greenhorn	24 February 2011	6.79
In 1968 Paul and Ruth reconcile, though after Brian has boasted of sleeping with Ruth, Paul punches him. Robert tells his son he thinks he should take Ruth out of the area to make a fresh start, but she is still convinced that there was more to her daughter's drowning than the official verdict — that she wandered off whilst out walking with her grandfather. In 1987, as Scott begins to have epileptic fits, Eddie brings Father Boyle in to exorcise Amy's room, though this leads to a row between Helen and Eddie, causing Amy to run away into the woods, where she is saved from falling into the lake by Olive. In 2010, both Nisha and Ruth hear ghostly noises, though Ruth keeps from Nisha that she was Alice's mother. Intrigued by Mark's visits to Olive, Nisha goes to see her and learns that, as a teenager, he lost his virginity to Olive. However he left the area before Olive gave birth to a baby that died, a fact which Olive never told him. Nisha sends Mark to see her.
5	"Episode 5"	James Kent	Stephen Greenhorn	3 March 2011	7.08
Paul and Ruth leave Marchlands, with Ruth vowing to return. After they have gone, Evelyn tells Robert she knows all about his affair with Liz Runcie, Olive's mother, and makes him reveal the true details of Alice's death, which they decide to keep secret so as not to destroy the family. In 1987, Helen sees Alice, who saves Scott after he has had a fit in his bath. She says nothing, but agrees the family should move out. Eddie takes Amy to see Alice's grave before they go, to prove that he believes her. She tells him that Alice writes ASKOR on surfaces, and in 2010 Ruth sees the same messages, realising it means "Ask O.R." – ask Olive Runcie. Olive then tells Ruth that Alice died after running away when she caught Robert and Liz having sex. Nisha and Mark arrive to console Ruth as she takes their baby into the woods.

== Lightfields ==
Lightfields
- Created by: David Schulner
- Developed by: Gallowgate Productions & 20th Century Fox Television
- Written by: Simon Tyrrell
- Directed by: Damon Thomas
- Creative director: Jane Dauncey
- Starring: Kris Marshall; Danny Miller; Luke Newberry; Sophie Thompson; Danny Webb; Michael Byrne; Lucy Cohu; Dakota Blue Richards; Karla Crome; Jill Halfpenny; Sam Hazeldine; Peter de Jersey
- Theme music composer: Sam Johnson
- Composer: Michael Price
- Country of origin: United Kingdom
- Original language: English
- No. of series: 1
- No. of episodes: 5

Production
- Executive producer: Kate Lewis
- Producer: Cherry Gould
- Production location: London
- Cinematography: Tim Fleming
- Camera setup: 3SIXTYMEDIA
- Running time: 60 minutes (w/advertisements)
- Production companies: ITV Studios; 20th Century Fox Television

Original release
- Network: ITV
- Release: 27 February – 27 March 2013

Related
- Marchlands (2011); Dos lagos

Lightfields was first shown on ITV on 27 February 2013. It follows a story of three different families living in the same house in Suffolk during three different time periods - 1944, 1975 and 2012. The three families are linked by the spirit of a young girl who died under mysterious circumstances in 1944.

=== Plot ===
In 1944, Eve (Dakota Blue Richards), an evacuee from London, arrives at Lightfields with her little sister Vivien (Leilah de Meza) and is sent to help out on the farm, owned by Albert (Sam Hazeldine) and Martha Felwood (Jill Halfpenny). She befriends Albert and Martha's daughter, Lucy (Antonia Clarke), who is later tragically killed in a fire at the barn after locking horns with Eve over the heart of dashing American Dwight (Neil Jackson). The rest of this time period shows Lucy's family grieving for their dead daughter and Eve's determination to find out what really happened to her.

In 1975, Vivien (Lucy Cohu) returns to Lightfields years later along with her daughter Clare (Karla Crome), in the summer of 1975 to stay at the house for six weeks, while Vivien is trying to take some time away to deal with her failing marriage. Shortly after they arrive, they notice some unusual activity happening on the property, and Vivien starts to remember through flashbacks the time she spent there in 1944 as an evacuee (Leilah de Meza) as she had blocked that period of time from her mind.

In 2012, Lightfields, now an up and running bed & breakfast, run by Lucy's nephew, Barry (Danny Webb). When Lucy's brother, Pip (Michael Byrne), returns to Lightfields, and strange things start happening, he believes that they are being haunted by Lucy's restless spirit. As these hauntings continue, Barry's wayward son-in-law Paul (Kris Marshall) uses the situation to his advantage as he tries to gain custody of his son Luke (Alexander Aze), who is being looked after by Barry and his wife Lorna (Sophie Thompson).

=== Production ===
In August 2012, ITV ordered a five-part follow-up to Marchlands after promising ratings. The cast for this series was announced to include Jill Halfpenny, Sam Hazeldine, Dakota Blue Richards, Lucy Cohu, Karla Crome, Danny Webb, Kris Marshall and Sophie Thompson. Simon Tyrell was later confirmed as the main scriptwriter for this series.

=== Characters ===
==== 1944 ====
- Lucy Felwood (Antonia Clarke). In 1944, Lucy - the daughter of Martha and Albert Felwood - dies in a barn fire. The police say it was a tragic accident but others are not so sure.
- Eve Traverse (Dakota Blue Richards). Eve arrives to help on Lightfields Farm and befriends Lucy prior to the tragedy. After Lucy's death, Eve is determined to find the truth.
- Vivien Traverse (Leilah de Meza). Vivien is the little sister of Eve who knows something about Lucy's death. No one knows her secret, the shock of which causes the memory to be locked away for years.
- Martha Felwood (Jill Halfpenny). Martha is the mother of Lucy who is grieving over her death.
- Albert Felwood (Sam Hazeldine). Albert is the father of Lucy who also knows something of what happened that horrific night.
- Dwight Lawson (Neil Jackson). Dwight is an American airman who had a liaison with Lucy on the night of the tragedy. A piece of evidence could tie him to the fire.
- Tom (Danny Miller). Tom works on Lightfields farm and has an unrequited crush on Lucy.
- Harry Dunn (Luke Newberry). Harry lives in the village and also has something of a crush on Lucy. He befriends Eve to find out what happened.
- Pip Felwood (Larry Mills). Pip is the younger brother to Lucy.

==== 1975 ====
- Older Vivien Mullen (née Traverse) (Lucy Cohu). The older Vivien visits Lightfields three decades later: however, her staying at Lightfields again starts to trigger memories of the awful summer of 1944.
- Clare Mullen (Karla Crome). Clare is the daughter to Vivien who joins her mother on the trip, where she begins a relationship with Nick.
- Older Tom (Wayne Foskett). The older Tom still lives in the village. He gets to know Vivien and Clare by carrying out repairs at Lightfields for their stay. However, could he be holding a secret memory of the fire of 1944?
- Nick (Chris Mason). Nick is the young local who has a holiday romance with Clare.

==== 2012 ====
- Older Pip Felwood (Michael Byrne). The elderly Pip returns to stay at Lightfields after an operation, but his return sparks a childhood memory from 1944.
- Barry Felwood (Danny Webb). Barry is Pip's son, who now runs Lightfields as a B&B.
- Lorna Felwood (Sophie Thompson). Lorna is married to Barry and helps him manage the B&B.
- Luke Fenner (Alexander Aze). Luke is Barry and Lorna's young grandson who - since the death of his mother - stays with them at Lightfields.
- Paul Fenner (Kris Marshall). Paul was married to Barry and Lorna's deceased daughter Trisha. His main obsessions are drinking and trying to gain custody of Luke.
- Older Vivien Mullen (née Traverse) (Lynn Farleigh). The older Vivien returns to Lightfields to help solve the mystery of the tragedy almost seventy years previously.

=== Episodes ===
No.	Title	Directed by	Written by	Original release date	UK viewers (millions)
1	"Episode 1"	Damon Thomas	Simon Tyrrell	27 February 2013	4.23
In 1944, teen-aged evacuee Eve befriends Lucy Felwood, who lives at Lightfields farm in Suffolk with her parents, Martha and Albert, and nine-year old brother Pip. At a dance, Eve meets American airman Dwight Lawson, but declines to go home with him. Later he meets Lucy and arranges a date, whilst Eve's younger sister Vivien plays with Pip. When young farmhand Harry reveals that he saw Lucy with Dwight, Eve becomes jealous. Shortly afterwards Lucy and Dwight go into a barn for sex, and the distraught family rushes out to see the barn on fire. Thirty-one years later Vivien and her daughter Clare come to stay at the farm for the summer. Clare is unsettled by a particular bedroom and, one night, despite a power cut, Vivien sees lights and hears voices from the room, though it proves to be empty. In 2012, the elderly Pip visits his son Barry and his wife Lorna, who are running Lightfields as a guest house, and caring for their grandson Luke. After a visit from Luke's hopeless father Paul, the boy vanishes.
2	"Episode 2"	Damon Thomas	Simon Tyrrell	6 March 2013	3.95
After Lucy has perished in the fire, the village comes together for her funeral but Eve is not convinced the fire was an accident. She searches the wreckage and finds Dwight's lighter, though when she confronts him, he denies any foul play. In 1975, Clare is concerned that her mother may be having another nervous breakdown and is relieved when John, her father, comes to see them. He wants Vivien to return to London with him for treatment, but Vivien believes she can resolve matters by staying at Lightfields. However, as more uncanny things start to happen, Clare worries that they are linked to Vivien's previous stay at Lightfields, and that a ghost may be trying to get through to her. In 2012, Luke goes missing and is found by Lucy's grave in the churchyard. When he tells Pip that he has seen what he believed to have been the tooth fairy incarnate as a young girl, Pip understands that Lucy's ghost may well be trying to communicate with the child.
3	"Episode 3"	Damon Thomas	Simon Tyrrell	13 March 2013	3.83
Harry and Eve still believe Lucy's death was no accident, and Harry is upset to learn that she had willing sex with Dwight. Eve asks Tom, who once had a crush on Lucy, if she went with the American to defy her strict father, Albert, but Tom will not be drawn. Harry also discovers a 'hate' letter Eve intended to send Lucy, as she was jealous of the affair with Dwight about which both Tom and Vivien knew. However in 1975, Clare is surprised when Vivien apparently fails to recall Lucy after seeing her grave stone. Clare asks Tom for information, but he is also reluctant to say much. The women obtain the recently deceased Eve's letters, including one swearing her little sister to secrecy. Clare is disturbed to believe her mother is hiding something, as the ghostly presence continues. In 2012, Luke starts a fire after seeing the ghost - a fact which gives Paul ammunition for his custody claim, a claim Barry sets out to discredit.
4	"Episode 4"	Damon Thomas	Simon Tyrrell	20 March 2013	3.47
Harry accuses Eve of starting the fire out of jealous after finding the hate letter, but Albert and Martha believe in her innocence. She is shocked to find out that Dwight has a wife and children, but he denies killing Lucy to prevent her exposing him. Eve also prevents Albert from killing himself out of guilt, for disowning Lucy after he knew she had had sex. In 1975, Clare is perturbed by her mother's claims that Lucy is coming to get her after ghostly messages are found around the house. Vivien calls on Tom who tells her how Lucy died, a fact which Vivien seems to have completely erased from her memory. He assures her she was in no way to blame, but she is not convinced. In 2012, Luke tells Pip the ghost is his guardian angel, but the old man is nervous and begs to differ. That night, they both see Lucy's ghost with her dress on fire. Lorna, aware that Paul may use dirty tricks for his custody claim, demands to know what is happening so Pip tells her and Barry the whole story.
5	"Episode 5"	Damon Thomas	Simon Tyrrell	27 March 2013	3.77
In 1944, as Harry goes off to war, Albert tells Eve the family is moving to Lincolnshire. Dwight comes to apologize for leaving Lucy alone in the bar, before he has a fatal motor-cycle crash. In 1975, Vivien sees the ghost of Lucy, which leads her to the remains of the burnt out barn, where she remembers how she saw Lucy go up in flames - but did nothing to help. She attempts an over-dose, but is saved by Tom. In 2012, Pip tells Lorna and Barry he believes the ghost is exacting revenge as he was the fire-starter, though his memory is dim. Paul tries to snatch Luke, but the ghost prevents him and ultimately the family come to see that Lucy is a benign presence, as Vivien arrives to tell them who really started the blaze.
