= Miriam Higareda =

Mexican actress

- Born: Miriam Higareda Cervantes; August 24, 1984 (age 41); Mexico City, Mexico
- Occupation: Actress
- Years active: 2007-present

Miriam Higareda (born August 24, 1984, in Mexico City, Mexico) is a Mexican actress.

== Filmography ==
- Tanto Amor (2015)
- Cásese quien pueda (2014)
- Vivir a Destiempo (2013)
- Emperatriz (2011)... Elena Mendoza del Real
- Te presento a Laura (2009) (movie)
- Mujer Comprada (2009)
- Cambio de Vida (2008)
- Se busca un hombre (2007)

== Theatre ==
- Violinista en el Tejado (2011)... Chava
- El Diario De Ana Frank (2009)... Ana Frank
