= Las Bravo =

- Genre: Telenovela
- Created by: Paz Aguirre
- Based on: Las Vega's by Jonathan Cuchacovich and Nicolás Wellmann
- Directed by: José Acosta; Enrique Pineda
- Creative director: Ariel Blanco
- Starring: Edith González; Mauricio Islas; Saúl Lisazo
- Theme music composer: Agustín Argüelles
- Opening theme: "Desnudas mi corazón" by Agustín Argüelles
- Country of origin: Mexico
- Original language: Spanish
- No. of episodes: 130

Production
- Executive producer: Maricarmen Marcos
- Producers: José Solano; Francisco Sosa
- Cinematography: Manuel Palacios
- Editor: Marco Iván González
- Camera setup: Multi-camera
- Production company: TV Azteca

Original release
- Network: Trece
- Release: 18 August 2014 – 13 February 2015

Related
- Siempre tuya Acapulco; Así en el barrio como en el cielo

Las Bravo is a Mexican telenovela produced by María del Carmen Marcos for TV Azteca in 2014.

Edith González, Mauricio Islas and Saúl Lisazo. Carolina Miranda, Carla Carrillo and Paulette Hernández star as the leading teen protagonists.

As of 18 August 2014 Canal 13 started broadcasting Las Bravo weekdays at 20:00 replacing Siempre Tuya Acapulco. Production of Las Bravo began on 18 February 2014.

== Plot ==
Valentina and her three daughters Adriana, Roberta and Fabiana live a carefree life. The sudden death of her husband reveals an exorbitant debt that Valentina and her three daughters must pay. The change in their financial situation forces them to live a very different life than the one to which they are accustomed. Together, they realize that the only way they have to get out of debt quickly is to take over a very peculiar business: a nightclub for women.

== Cast ==
=== Starring ===
- Edith González as Valentina Díaz de Bravo
- Mauricio Islas as Leonardo Barbosa / Salvador Martínez
- Saúl Lisazo as Enrique Velázquez

=== Also starring ===
- Carla Carrillo as Roberta Bravo Díaz
- Carolina Miranda as Carmen Bravo Díaz
- Paulette Hernández as Adriana Bravo
- Héctor Arredondo as Gerardo Ibañez / Gerry
- Lambda García as Fernando Sánchez
- Juan Vidal as Secundino Godínez / Adonis
- Pedro Sicard as Samuel Robles
- María Fernanda Quiroz as Rosa "Roxana" de Sánchez
- Eugenio Montessoro as José Bravo / El Toro
- Alberto Casanova as Manuel Campilla
- Mauricio Aspe as Patricio Castro
- Cecilia Piñeiro as Virginia Ibáñez
- Ángeles Marín as Miguelina de Bravo
- Claudia Marín as Evangelina López
- Fabián Peña as Aníbal Villaseñor
- Josefo Rodríguez as Cándido Pastrana
- Jorge Zepeda as Teodoro
- Lizeth Cuevas as Beatriz Alcántara
- Stefany Hinojosa as Tania
- Tamara Fascovich as Liliana "Lily" Castro
- Cynthia Quintana as Ingrid
- José Astorga as Jairo Velázquez
- Ernesto Diaz del Castillo as Gabriel Cisneros
- Roberto Mares as José Primitivo Bravo
- Ángel Vigón as René Pastrana
- Esaú as Roberto "Robertito" Cisneros
- Patricio Guzmán as José Manuel Campilla
- Cinthia Vázquez as Xiomara

=== Recurring ===
- Andrea Martí as Lucía de Martínez
- Betty Monroe as Candela Millán
- Salvador Amaya as Lucas
