= The Four Altars =

- Promotional release poster
- Directed by: Alonso del Río
- Written by: Alonso del Río
- Produced by: Karen Martin del Campo; José Alberto Benites; Beyker Bances
- Starring: Silke Klein; Damián Alcázar
- Cinematography: Juan Cristobal Castillero
- Music by: Alonso del Río
- Production company: 4 Altares S.A.C.
- Release date: September 21, 2023
- Country: Peru
- Language: Spanish

The Four Altars (Spanish: Los cuatro altares) is a 2023 Peruvian drama film written, scored and directed by Alonso del Río in his directorial debut, based on his book of the same name. Starring Silke Klein and Damián Alcázar.

== Synopsis ==
The intensity of the life of Ana, a Spanish journalist, has reached its climax. On a trip to the Amazon that begins as an investigation into deforestation and illegal gold, he meets Don Abel, a man initiated into an ancient sacred science. Ana will find herself immersed in a ritual that will change her life.

== Cast ==
- Silke Klein as Ana
- Damián Alcázar as Don Abel
- Magaly Solier as Lucia
- Diana Quijano as Dora
- Valentina Vargas as Doña Sofía
- Eivaut Rischen as Andrés

== Production ==
The film was produced through a crowdfounding campaign. Principal photography began in 2019 with plans to continue filming through 2020, but was suspended due to the COVID-19 pandemic. Finally, recordings resumed in 2021 in Mexico, Barcelona, Cusco and the Amazon rainforest.

== Release ==
It premiered on September 21, 2023, on the Ayahuasca Ayllu platform under rental.
