= Armando Torrea =

Mexican actor

- Born: Armando Torrea Carrasco; April 14, 1983 (age 41); Mexicali, Baja California, Mexico
- Occupation: Actor
- Years active: 2003–present
- Spouse: Laura Alejandra Pérez (m. 2020)
- Children: 1

Armando Torrea (born April 14, 1983), is a Mexican actor.

== Filmography ==
Year	Title	Role	Notes
2008–2009	Contrato de amor	Apolo	Supporting role
2009–2010	Pobre Diabla	Antonio "Tony" Rodríguez	Supporting role
2010–2011	Prófugas del destino	Raúl Caballero	Supporting role
2012	La teniente	Lieutenant Adán Peña	Main cast
2015	Así en el barrio como en el cielo	Flavio Ferrara	Co-lead role
2015–2016	¿Quién es quién?	Santiago Blanco	
2017	La doble vida de Estela Carrillo	Steve White	Supporting role
2019	Por amar sin ley	Jorge Aguirre	2 episodes
2021	La desalmada	José Vargas	85 episodes
