= Carla Hernández =

Mexican actress (born 1987)

- Born: Carla Hernández; February 18, 1987 (age 39); Guadalajara, Jalisco, Mexico
- Occupation: Actress
- Years active: 2010-present
- Partner: Héctor Arredondo (2009-2014)
- Children: 2
- Relatives: Alejandra (half-sister); Mario Alberto Hernández (deceased)

Carla Hernández (born February 18, 1987) is a Mexican actress, who attended TV Azteca's acting class, Centro de Formación Actoral. She made her official acting debut in Azteca's Vidas Robadas, as Luz and Camila, the protagonist and antagonist, alongside Christian Bach and Andrés Palacios, in 2010.

== Personal life ==
Hernández is the youngest of three siblings. She has an elder half-sister. When she was 10, she lost her brother, Mario Alberto, who was 16, after a car accident. At the age of 19, she gave birth to her son, Carlos, who lives in Guadalajara with her parents. As of March, 2013, she was pregnant again, apparently by Héctor Arredondo, who died in 2014.

== Filmography ==
Telenovelas
Year	Title	Role	Notes
2009-10	Pasión morena	Tania	Special Appearance
2010	Vidas robadas	Luz Herrera /Luz Fernández-Vidal /Camila Fernández-Vidal	
2012	Rosa diamante	Rosa Andrade Andere de Altamirano /Rosa Puentes / Eva Sotomayor	Lead role
2015-16	Señora Acero	Señorita Aldama	Recurring role
