= Diana Quijano =

Peruvian actress and model (born 1962)

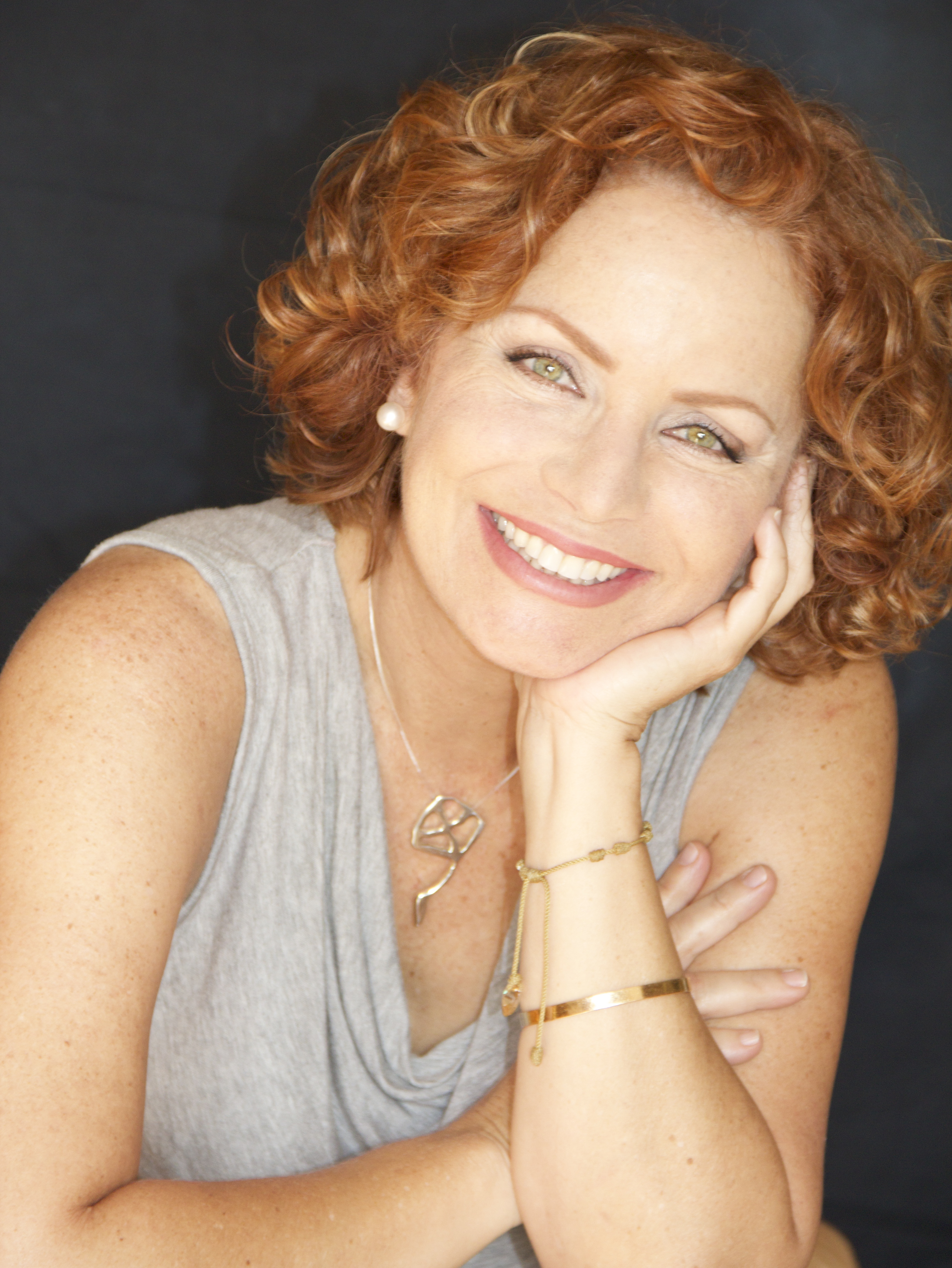
- Born: Diana Quijano Valdivieso; April 12, 1962 (age 64); Lima, Peru
- Occupations: Actress, Model
- Children: Samikai

Diana Quijano Valdivieso (born April 12, 1962) is a Peruvian actress and model.

== Filmography ==
=== Television ===
- Eres mi bien (Latina Televisión, 2025-2026) as Leticia Montes de Oca
- Parientes a la fuerza (Telemundo, 2021) as Michelle Bonnet
- La hija pródiga (TV Azteca, 2017-2018) as Matilde Salamanca.
- Nuestra historia (TV PERU, 2015) as Ivette.
- De Millonario a Mendigo (IMIZU PRODUCCIONES,2015) As Ivett del Carpio.
- Tierra de reyes (Telemundo, 2014) as Beatriz “La Nena” Alcazar de la Fuente.
- Dama y obrero (2013) as Gina Perez
- Niñas mal 2 (MTV Latinoamérica, 2013) as Macarena de la Fuente.
- La Prepago (Sony - 2012) as Lia Rochel
- Los herederos del Monte (Telemundo, 2011) as Sofía Cañadas.
- Niñas mal (MTV Latinoamérica, 2010) as Maca.
- Bella calamidades (Telemundo, 2009) as Regina de Galeano.
- Victoria (Telemundo, 2007-2008) as Camila Matiz.
- Sin Vergüenza (Telemundo, 2007) as Memé del Solar.
- Al Son del Amor (WAPA-TV, 2005) as Silvia.
- Prisionera (Telemundo, 2004) as Lucero "Lulú" de Ríobueno.
- Gata Salvaje (Venevisión, 2002) as Sonia.
- Secreto de amor (Venevisión, 2001) as Isolda García.
- La Revancha (Venevisión, 2000) as Lucía Arciniegas.
- Morelia (Televisa, 1995) as Alexa Ramírez "La Gata".
- Guadalupe (Telemundo, 1993-1994) as Drogadicta.
- Mala mujer (Frecuencia Latina, 1991) as Silvia Rivasplata.
- El hombre que debe morir (Panamericana Televisión, 1989) as Esther Keller.
- No hay por quien llorar (1988) as Secretaria.

=== Theatre ===
- "Vanya Y Sonya Y Masha Y Spike (2015-2016) Plan 9.
- "Te comió la lengua el Ratón" (2015) Microteatro como Morgana.
- Tr3s (2014) como Rocio Moreno
- Que Depresion Post Parto ni que Carajo Autor: Betsabe Capriles(2014) Monologo
- Un Tranvia llamado Deseo (2013) Blanche Dubois
- Ocho Mujeres(2012) as Pierrette.
- Carmín, el Musical (2011) as Claudia Menchelli
- La Lechuga (2002-2003) as Virginia
- El tio Mauricio (2001) as Bailarina.
- Daniela Frank, libreto para una función clandestina (1993) como Daniela
- Pataclaun en la ciudad (1992) como MUDA.
- Cronicas Imakinarias (1991) as Coreografo/Bailarina.
- Catherine et l'armoire (1991) as MUTANTE FEMENINO.
- Sexus (1989) as Coreografias bailarina.
- Acero Inoxidable (1987) as Coreografias y Teatro Danza "Bailarina".
- Nina de ningunos ojos (1985) as Creación Colectiva "La niña del cuento".

=== Film ===
- The Four Altars (2023) Director Alonso del Río, as “Dora”
- Forgiveness (2018) Director Alex Kahaum, “as The Keeper”
- La Fundación de Lucía (2018) Director Gabriel Reyes, as Art Critic
- South Beach Dreams (2006) Director Errol Falcon, as Felicia Torres.
- Zona de Miedo (2006) Director Pamela Yates Documental-Narracion.
- Los Díaz de Doris (1999) Director Abdiel Colbert, como Amneris López.
- Cotidiano 1992 Director Marité Ugaz as la mujer.
- La manzanita del diablo (1990) as La Gata.
- Fire in the Amazon (1991) Journalist.
- Furias (1991) as La Amante.
- Raquel (1991) as Raquel.
- Se sienten pasos (1991) as Ladrona.
- Welcome to Oblivium (1990) as Radio.
- Crime Zone (1989) as PoliceWoman 2.

== Health issues ==
On June 29, 2022, Quijano publicly disclosed that she was diagnosed with breast cancer.
