= Rosa diamante =

Television series

- Genre: Telenovela
- Created by: Enrique Óscar Torres
- Developed by: Argos Comunicación; Telemundo Studios, Miami
- Written by: Sandra Velasco; Luis Colmenares; Arnaldo Limansky; Gennys Pérez
- Screenplay by: Sandra Velasco
- Directed by: Miguel Varoni; Victor Hugo Saldierna
- Starring: Mauricio Ochmann; Lupita Ferrer; Carla Hernández
- Theme music composer: Marco Flores
- Opening theme: "Rosa diamante" by Eli Flores
- Composer: Marco FLores
- Countries of origin: Mexico; United States
- Original languages: Spanish, English
- No. of episodes: 129

Production
- Executive producer: Marcela Mejía
- Producer: Ana Graciela Ugalde
- Cinematography: Damián Aguilar; Esteban de Llaca; Luis Ávila
- Editor: Marcos González
- Camera setup: Multi-camera

Original release
- Network: Telemundo
- Release: July 10, 2012 – January 21, 2013

Related
- Una Maid en Manhattan; Pasión prohibida; Perla negra (1994); Pérola negra (1998)

Rosa diamante (Spanish pronunciation: [ˈrosa ðjaˈmante], Precious Rose) is a Spanish-language telenovela produced by United States-based television network Telemundo Studios, Miami and Mexican Argos Comunicación. It is a remake of Argentine telenovela Perla Negra, written by Enrique Torres. Carla Hernández, Mauricio Ochmann, Lupita Ferrer, and [(Mariana Villalvazo Martín)] are starring in this telenovela.

== History ==
From July 10 to July 23, 2012, Telemundo aired half-hour episodes of Rosa Diamante weeknights at 8:30pm/7:30c, along with Una Maid en Manhattan. Starting July 24, 2012, Telemundo aired Rosa Diamante weeknights at 8pm/7c, replacing Una Maid en Manhattan. The last episode was broadcast on January 21, 2013, with Pasión Prohibida replacing it the following day. As with most of its other telenovelas, the network broadcast English subtitles as closed captions on CC3.

== Plot ==
A wealthy sophisticated woman (Rosaura) abandons a newborn baby girl in a boarding school, and leaves nineteen diamonds with her. 18 of the diamonds are meant to pay for each year of her school expenses, until the baby reaches eighteen years old, and the last diamond is pink colored, and is supposed to be given to the baby girl when she grows up and is ready to leave the school. Years pass, Rosa turns into a beautiful young lady. Her biggest treasures are her boundless imagination and her friendship with Eva, who is another girl at the boarding school.

One fine day, Eva meets a boy named José Ignacio, a wealthy young man who makes fun of her and pretends his name is Adam, just to lure her in. The young Eva falls in love and ends up pregnant but Jose Ignacio leaves her. After giving birth, a terrible car accident abruptly ends Eva's life. Rosa, who was also in the accident, is mistakenly identified as Eva in the aftermath, and Rosa lets everyone believe she really is Eva so that little Eduardito will not end up in an orphanage. Rosa sets on a plan of revenge on Jose Ignacio, who just happens to be Eva's cousin, Barbara's fiancé. She also strives to give Eduardito proper love.

== Cast ==
=== Main ===
- Mauricio Ochmann as José Ignacio Altamirano
- Lupita Ferrer as Rosaura Sotomayor
- Carla Hernández as Rosa Andrade / Eva Sotomayor
- Mariana Villalvazazo Martín as Lucía Altamirano
- Patricio Castillo as Eduardo Sotomayor
- Claudia Ramírez as Raquel Altamirano
- Begoña Narváez as Bárbara Montenegro
- Sofía Lama as Andrea Fernández
- Luis Xavier as Gerardo Altamirano
- Manuel Balbi as Gabriel Robles
- Luciana Silveyra as Margaret Bridges / Margarita Puentes
- Néstor Rodulfo as Ramón Gómez
- Marco de Paula as Gerardo "Junior" Altamirano, Jr.
- Patricia Conde as Leticia Sotomayor
- Ignacio Riva Palacio as Martín Montenegro
- Heriberto Méndez as Sergio Escobar
- Mariana Villalvazo Martín as Lucía Altamirano
- Ofelia Guiza as Soledad "Chole"
- Thali García as Eva Sotomayor
- Constantino Costas as Rodolfo Montenegro

=== Recurring ===
- Marco Treviño as Antonio Andrade
- Julieta Grajales as Maria Corina Villalta
- Roberto Uscanga as Jairo Roncancio
- Miguel Garza as Leonardo Bernal
- Gustavo Navarro as Federico Valenti
- Iván Bronstein as Horacio Villarreal
- Tsuria Díaz as Valeria Sotelo
- Tamara Mazarrasa as Graciela Parra
- Francisco Calvillo as Jorge Pacheco
- Arnoldo Picazzo as Vladimir Bonilla
- Luis Yeverino as Detective Morocho

== Awards and nominations ==
Year	Award	Category	Nominee	Result
2012	Premios People en Español 2012	Best Villain	Lupita Ferrer	Nominated
2012	Premios People en Español 2012	Revelation of the Year	Carla Hernández	Won
2013	Miami Life Awards 2013	TV - Best First Actress	Lupita Ferrer	Won
2013	Miami Life Awards 2013	TV - Best Telenovela	Rosa Diamante	Nominated
2013	Premios Tu Mundo	Favorite Lead Actress	Carla Hernández	Nominated
2013	Premios Tu Mundo	First Actress	Lupita Ferrer	Nominated
