= Tormenta de pasiones =

Mexican telenovela

- Genre: Telenovela
- Created by: Caridad Bravo Adams
- Country of origin: Mexico
- Original language: Spanish

Original release
- Network: Telesistema Mexicano
- Release: 1965

Tormenta de pasiones is a Mexican telenovela produced by Televisa for Telesistema Mexicano in 1965.

== Cast ==
- Vanessa Terkes
- Sebastián Ligarde
- Beatriz Sheridan
