= Carlos Martínez (actor) =

Spanish mime actor (born 1955)

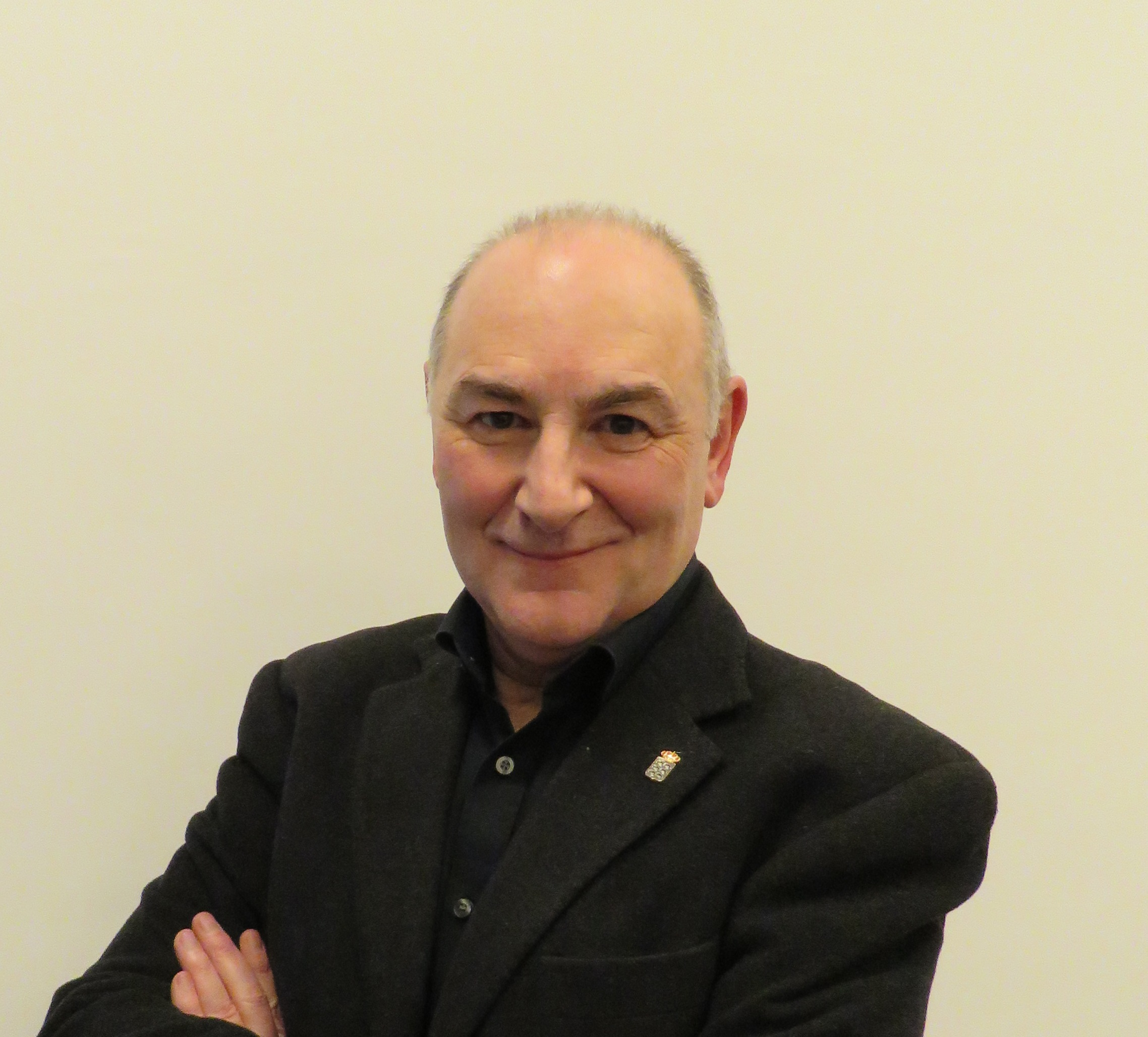
- Carlos Martínez, during the First World Mime Conference in Belgrade 2018
- Born: 30 September 1955 (age 70); Pravia, Asturias, Spain
- Occupation: Mime artist
- Website: www.carlosmartinez.es

Carlos Martínez (born 30 September 1955) is a Spanish mime actor. He has participated in the formation of various theatre groups and has taught mime and theatre in public schools, at the University of Zaragoza and at numerous international art seminars. He has published two manuals on mime, In Silence and Word of Mime.

== Early life ==
Carlos Martínez was born 30 September 1955 in Pravia (Asturias), Spain. At the age of 12, he moved to Barcelona, where he discovered his love for acting. He entered the pantomime school "Taller de Mimo y Teatro Contemporáneo" (1980), the performing arts school "El Timbal" (1981) and studied under professors such as Manuel Carlos Lillo and Jorge Vera (1982–1987).

Carlos Martínez worked throughout Europe and in countries as diverse as Brazil, Canada, Chile, Philippines, Russia, South Africa, and the USA. He toured extensively in Europe with the Zahorí theatre company (1996–1998) presenting "The Golden Rule/Learning by Doing—A Celebration of our Differences in an Open Europe". The project involved the use of drama in adult education and was sponsored by the Socrates Fund of the EU.

Over the years, seven feature-length programs emerged: humorous solo shows like "Hand Made" and "Books without Words", thematic concept programs like "My Bible" and "Human Rights". and his 25th, 30th and 40th stage anniversary shows "Time to Celebrate" (2007), "Mirage" (2012) and "Vitamimo" (2022). His collaborative programs include "Silent Night" (performed in ensemble with some of his advanced students), Pianomime (with the German pianist-composer, Johannes Nitsch), "Still & Stark" (with Andreas Malessa) and "Klassisch!" with French pianist Shani Diluka Shani Diluka.

== Prizes and distinctions ==
- Performed at the arts festivals Mime Champagne (1993, 1994) and Mim D’Or in France (1996) and Switzerland (1997).
- Television for BBC (UK), TVE, TV3 (ES), SWR, WDR, ZDF (DE), LTV (LV), SRF (CH)
- 2002 Carlos Martínez named artist of the year by the German foundation Bibel und Kultur.
- 2004 "Hand Made" received the prize of honour, voted by the audience as the best show of the XXI Almada Theatre Festival.
- 2006 The DVD "Human Rights" nominated for the Adam Award of the International Sabaoth Filmfestival of Milan (category: feature documentary)
- 2009 "Books without Words" chosen by the audience as the winner of the 5th edition of the TeatroAgosto festival held in Fundão, Portugal.
- 2014 Carlos Martínez received the Plaque of City of Amman presented by HRH Princess Muna al-Hussein, Jordan
- 2015 Carlos Martínez received the Golden Medal, granted by the European Forum Cum Laude in Oviedo, Spain
- 2018 Carlos Martínez received the WMO Award, granted by the World Mime Organisation in Belgrade, Serbia

== Releases ==
- Book: In Silence (1992; published in Spanish, German and French, German title: Stille Kunst)
- Book: Word of Mime (1995, published in German and French, German title: Pantomimenwort)
- Book: Ungeschminkte Weisheiten (2009, published in German, by Aussaat, ISBN 978-3-7615-5729-7)
- Book: From the Dressing Room (2011, published in English, ISBN 978-84-614-8359-4)
- Book: Desde el camerino (2011, published in Spanish, ISBN 978-84-614-8360-0)
- Book: Der Poet der Stille (2020, published in German, by Brunnen Verlag, ISBN 978-3-7655-0737-3)
- DVD: My Bible (2003)
- DVD: Human Rights (2005)
- DVD: Hand Made (2007)
- DVD: Books without Words (2012)
- DVD: Still My Bible (2016)
