= Alejandra Lazcano =

Mexican actress (born 1984)

- Born: Alejandra Lazcano; December 31, 1984 (age 41); Mexico City, Distrito Federal, Mexico
- Occupation: Actress
- Years active: 1996-present
- Height: 171 cm (5 ft 7 in)
- Website: http://www.alejandralazcano.com/

Alejandra Lazcano (born December 31, 1984) is a Mexican actress, best known for her roles in telenovelas Acorralada and Pobre Diabla.

== Biography ==
=== Early life ===
Alejandra started acting in soap operas at a young age.

Her very first role was in the soap opera Señora in 1998, a year later in Catalina y Sebastián, La duda in 2000, and Como En El Cine in 2001.

In 2003 Alejandra had a bigger role in soap opera La hija del jardinero where she played an antagonist for the first time.

=== Career ===
Alejandra's first leading role came to her in 2004, in the soap opera Tormenta de pasiones, where her leading man was Alejandro de la Madrid. In 2007, fame came to her through the international recognition of Acorralada, a production of Venevisión Internacional and Univisión where she shared credits with David Zepeda, Sonya Smith, Mariana Torres among others. She played sweet Diana, a young woman with a great heart.

In 2009, Alejandra Lazcano was the protagonist in Valeria again with Venevisión and this time with Jorge Reyes as her leading man.

She returned to Mexico to be the protagonist of the telenovela Pobre Diabla which premiered on July 20, 2009, on TV Azteca. In 2011, she played in Cielo rojo produced by TV Azteca, in a leading role.

== Television ==
Year	Telenovelas	Role	Notes
1998	Señora	Fabiola Blanca	
1999	Catalina y Sebastián	Martina Mendoza	
2001	Como en el cine	Sofia Borja	
2002	La duda	Graciela	
2003	La Hija del Jardinero	Vanessa Sotomayor	
2004	Tormenta de pasiones	Isabel del Castillo	
2005	Corazón partido	Claudia Loret	
2007	Acorralada	Diana Soriano	
2008	Valeria	Valeria Hidalgo	
2009	Pobre diabla	Daniela Montenegro	
2011	Cielo rojo	Daniela Rentería	
2012	A corazón abierto	Alondra	
2015	Caminos de Guanajuato	Maria Clara	
2021-24	Un día para vivir	Fabiana Zully Laura	Episode: "Mentiras" Episode: "El Anillo" Episode: "El Muerto Del 204"
2022	Rutas de la vida	América	Episode: "Duplicidad"
2022	La Reina del Sur	Lina	3 episodes
2023	Esta historia me suena	Begoña	Episode: "Escándalo"
2025	La Jefa	Verónica Ramos	
2025	Cautiva por amor	Melina	

== Theatre ==
Year	Theatre	Role
2000	La Sirenita	Airle
1999	Las Leandras	Fermina
	El Club De Los Cinco	
