= Acorralada =

- Genre: Telenovela
- Created by: Alberto Gómez
- Directed by: Arquímedes Rivero; Yaky Ortega; Tito Rojas
- Creative director: Raúl de la Nuez
- Starring: Alejandra Lazcano; David Zepeda; Maritza Rodríguez; Jorge Luis Pila; Mariana Torres; Roberto Mateos; Sonya Smith
- Theme music composer: Ángel Arce "Acorralada" by Ángel Arce "Eres tu" by Ángel Arce and Jossel Calveiro
- Countries of origin: United States; Venezuela
- Original language: Spanish
- No. of episodes: 187

Production
- Executive producers: Peter Tinoco; Ana Teresa Arismendi
- Producer: Dulce Terán
- Production locations: Miami, Florida; New York City, New York; Mexico City, Mexico; Las Vegas, Nevada; Houston, Texas; Key West, Florida; Orlando, Florida; San Francisco, California; Atlanta, Georgia; Los Angeles, California; San Juan, Puerto Rico; Santo Domingo, Dominican Republic; Aruba
- Cinematography: Eduardo Dávila
- Editor: Lisset Sánchez
- Camera setup: Multi-camera
- Running time: 45 minutes
- Production companies: Univision; Venevisión

Original release
- Network: Univisión
- Release: January 15 – October 5, 2007

Acorralada (Trapped) is an American telenovela produced by Venevisión. Univision aired Acorralada from January 15, 2007 to October 5, 2007 on weekday afternoons at 2pm/1c. It was rebroadcast in late 2011 through April 2012 on Univision's sister network, Telefutura (now UniMás). It was filmed in Miami, Florida (USA), and lasted about 187 episodes. It is the second long-running telenovela that Venevisión Productions has produced without its former co-producer Fonovideo. Acorralada is the theme and another notable song "Eres Tu" written by Angel Arce and Jossel Calveiro. It stars as Alejandra Lazcano, Mariana Torres, Sonya Smith, David Zepeda, William Levy, and Bernie Paz as the main protagonists, while Jorge Luis Pila, Maritza Rodríguez, Frances Ondiviela, Orlando Fundichely, Alicia Plaza, Virna Flores, Grettel Trujillo, Diana Osorio, Valentina Bove, Yul Bürkle, Julián Gil and Juan Vidal are the main villains/ antagonists of the story.

It began airing in Venezuela on December 10, 2008 in the 11 pm time slot on Venevisión and finished on July 25, 2009 with seven months of airing and being the most successful telenovela for its time slot since La fea más bella.

Cisneros Media released Acorralada on DVD in the United States on December 2, 2008, a week before its debut on Venezuelan television. The DVD set consists of three discs, and has a running time of 596 minutes. The show is heavily edited in order to fit into three discs. Neither Venevision nor Univision have plans to offer a more complete version.

The show has been broadcast in more than 50 countries.

== Plot summary ==
Fedora Garcés Ledezma (Sonya Smith) is a woman who had everything, a husband she loved, two small daughters and a perfume factory with which she and her family had a comfortable life. An ambitious and ruthless woman named Octavia Alarcón de Irazábal (Frances Ondiviela), out of sheer envy, snatched away everything she had.

Octavia's husband Horacio murdered Fedora's husband and got Fedora to appear as the culprit of that murder. Octavia snatched her perfume factory, her fortune and her daughters leaving Fedora locked in prison for that murder she did not commit.

The daughters of Fedora were given to Miguelina Soriano (Nelida Ponce), an older woman who raised them by making them believe that they were her granddaughters by naming them Diana and Gabriela, she is the old woman who was Fedora's maid whom she grew up with. Octavia and her family, the Irazábal, became a rich and powerful family, thanks to what Octavia stole from Fedora.

Years later, Fedora is released by a pardon and begins to work like singer under the nickname of "La Gaviota", but with the idea to recover what they snatched away from her and get revenge on the Irazábal family.

Meanwhile, Fedora's daughters, Diana (Alejandra Lazcano) and Gaby (Mariana Torres), who have grown up humbly with their adoptive grandmother, come to work at Octavia's house. Gaby as a servant and Diana as Octavia's mother-in-law's nurse. Their paths cross with the two sons of Octavia, Maximiliano (David Zepeda) and Larry Irazabal Alarcón (William Levy).

Gaby falls in love with Larry and Diana of Maximiliano, two loves that, although they are reciprocated, are impossible by the obstacles that begun by Octavia and are owed to Gaviota.

== Cast ==
=== Starring ===
- Alejandra Lazcano as Diana Soriano
- David Zepeda as Maximiliano "Max" Irazábal Alarcón / Alejandro Salvatierra
- Maritza Rodríguez as Deborah Mondragón de Dávila / Marfil Mondragón de Irazábal
- Jorge Luis Pila as Diego Suárez
- Mariana Torres as Gabriela "Gaby" Soriano
- Roberto Mateos as Francisco "Paco" Vázquez
- Sonya Smith as Fedora Garcés Ledezma "La Gaviota"
- Bernie Paz as Rodrigo Santana

=== Also starring ===
- Frances Ondiviela as Octavia Alarcón viuda de Irazábal
- Ofelia Cano as Yolanda Alarcón
- Alicia Plaza as Bruna Pérez
- Griselda Noguera as Lala Suárez
- Virna Flores as Camila Linares
- Maritza Bustamante as Caramelo Vázquez
- Raúl Olivo as Emilio Linares
- Elizabeth Gutiérrez as Paola Irazábal Alarcón
- Grettel Trujillo as Isabel Dávila
- William Levy as Larry Irazábal Alarcón
- Mariana Huerdo as Silvita Delgado
- Andrés Mistage as Jorge
- Diana Osorio as Pilar Álamo
- Valentina Bove as Sharon Santana
- Orlando Fundichely as Dr. Ignacio Montiel
- Paulo Quevedo as René Romero
- Yul Bürkle as Andrés Dávila
- Julián Gil as Francisco "Pancholón" Suárez
- Juan Vidal as Enrique "Kike" Díaz
- Rosina Grosso as Sandy

=== Recurring ===
- Liannet Borrego as Nancy
- Nélida Ponce as Miguelina Soriano
- Sandra García as Samantha
- Miguel Gutiérrez as Licenciado Reynoso
- Lucero Lazo as Doña Santa viuda de Irazábal
- Julio Capote as Lorenzo Ferrer
- Ángel Nodal as Pedro Salvatierra

=== Special guest stars ===
- Héctor Soberón as Horacio Irazábal
- Thauro as Pablo
- Claudia Reyes as Fiona Valente
- Nury Flores as Mercedes
- Mirta Renee as Marcela
- Corina Azopardo as Judge Villagrande
- Sebastián Ligarde as Licenciado Borges
- Khotan Fernández as Gerardo
- Andrés García Jr. as Álvaro Ferrer
- Gonzalo Vivanco as Eduardo
- Víctor Rodríguez as "El Alacrán"
- Salim Rubiales as Ismael
- Laura Ferretti as Virginia
- Rocío Bastidas as nun
