= Bernie Paz =

Peruvian actor (born 1968)

- Born: Bernardo Paz-Soldan; July 5, 1968 (age 58); Lima, Peru
- Occupation: Actor
- Spouse: Shirley Budge Elmore
- Children: 1

Bernardo "Bernie" Paz (born July 5, 1968) is a Peruvian telenovela actor. He currently resides in Miami. He is married to a Peruvian TV host-actress Shirley Budge Elmore and has a daughter. He is currently the male lead in Azteca's 2011 telenovela, "Emperatriz" with Gabriela Spanic whom he worked with back in Telemundo's Tierra de Pasiones in 2007.

== Trajectory ==
=== Television ===
- Siempre tuya Acapulco (2014) - Stefano Canciano
- Quererte así (2012) - Gustavo Navarrete
- Emperatriz (2011) - Alejandro Miranda
- Lalola (2011) - Ramiro "Lalo" Padilla Special appearance
- Vidas Robadas (2010) - Joan Manuel Villain
- Mujer Comprada (2009-2010) - Franco
- Condesa por amor (2009) - Anibal
- Amas de Casa Desesperadas - Carlos Solis
- Mi adorada Malena (primera novela interactiva de Univision) - Leonardo
- Acorralada - Rodrigo Santana
- Decisiones - Manuel
- Tierra de Pasiones - Fernando Solís, special appearance
- El pasado no perdona - Esteban Zaldivar/Manuel Lara
- Milagros - Gringo Veloachaga
- Ángel Rebelde - Claudio Salazar
- La Hechicera Ecuador - Andrés Bustamante
- Todo Sobre Camila - Eduardo Bonfil Villain
- Soledad - Leonardo 'Leo' García
- Vidas prestadas - Renato 'Reni' Valente López
- María Rosa, búscame una esposa - Gonzalo
- Amor Serrano

=== Movies ===
- Destiny Has No Favorites (2003) - Alejandro
- El Candidato (2016) - Mickey
