= Mujer comprada =

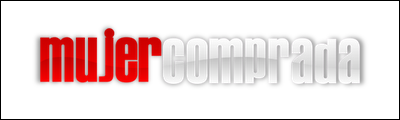
- Also known as: La Fuerza del Destino
- Created by: Ligia Lezama
- Developed by: TV Azteca for Azteca Novelas
- Directed by: Luiz Velez; Mauricio Meneses
- Starring: José Ángel Llamas; Andrea Marti
- Theme music composer: Jorge Avedano Luhrs
- Opening theme: "La Fuerza del Destino" Performed by Cynthia & Adran
- Country of origin: Mexico
- Original language: Spanish
- No. of episodes: 140

Production
- Executive producer: Rafael Urióstegui
- Producer: Mirna Ojeda
- Production location: Mexico City
- Camera setup: Multi-camera
- Running time: 42 minutes
- Production company: TV Azteca

Original release
- Network: Azteca Trece
- Release: 24 August 2009 – 5 March 2010

Mujer Comprada (purchased woman, woman for sale) is the title of a Spanish-language telenovela produced by the Mexican television network TV Azteca.

== Cast ==
=== Main cast ===
- José Ángel Llamas - Miguel Angel Diaz
- Andrea Martí - Angelica Valdez
- Gabriela Vergara - Laura Herrera
- Bernie Paz - Franco Rossi
- Saby Kamalich - Giovanna
- Héctor Bonilla - Abelardo Diaz
- Montserrat Ontiveros - Consuelo
- Martha Mariana Castro - Ofelia

=== Secondary cast ===
- Miriam Higareda - Francisca 'Francis' Valdez
- Rodrigo Cachero - Cosme Herrera
- Cynthia Rodríguez - Susana 'Susa'
- Erick Chapa - Alfonso Diaz-Lozano
- Luis Yeverino - Daniel
- Claudia Lobo - Regina
- Cecilia Piñeiro - Jenny (Villana)
- José Carlos Rodríguez - Padre Lucas
- Sandra Quiroz - Sofía 'Sofi'
- Guillermo Quintanilla - Álvaro
- Patrick Fernández - 'Chícharo'
- Matías Novoa - Germán
- Cristal Uribe - Silvia
- Luis Cárdenas - Bosco
- María José Rosado - Julia
- Tatiana del Real - Tabata
- Natalie Schumacher- Luisa
- Surya Macgregor- Lorena
- Francisco Porras
- Patricia Vásquez- Mariana
- Victor Luis Zuñiga- Mario
- Paco Mauri - Don Manuel
