= Pobre diabla (Mexican TV series) =

- Created by: Ines Rodena
- Developed by: TV Azteca
- Directed by: Martin Barraza; Fabian Corres; Carlos Sanchez Ross
- Starring: Alejandra Lazcano; Cristóbal Lander
- Theme music composer: Robles G. Cesar Augusto Gonzales
- Opening theme: "Pobre Diabla" performed by Myriam Montemayor Cruz & Fabiola Rodas
- Country of origin: Mexico
- Original language: Spanish
- No. of episodes: 195

Production
- Executive producer: Pedro Luévano
- Producers: Fides Velasco; Alberto Santini Lara
- Production location: Mexico City
- Editor: Mauricio Espejel
- Camera setup: Multi-camera
- Running time: 42 minutes

Original release
- Network: Azteca Trece
- Release: July 20, 2009 – April 16, 2010

Related
- Eternamente tuya; Quiéreme tonto; La gata (1968); La fiera (1983); Rosa salvaje (1987); María la del barrio (1995); Por un beso (2000); Gata salvaje (2002); The Stray Cat (2014)

Pobre Diabla (Daniela) is a telenovela by TV Azteca in partnership with Venevision Continental, produced by Fides Velasco and starring Alejandra Lazcano, the presentation of Cristobal Lander in Mexico, Hector Arredondo, Leonardo Daniel, Rafael Sanchez Navarro and antagonistic involvement of Claudia Alvarez. It is adapted from telenovela Cara Sucia of Venezuela, which is also a version of the drama La Gata, written by Ines Rodena.

== Plot ==
Daniela (nicknamed La Diabla) and Santiago fall in love with other at first sight after knowing each other accidentally. At first the work of Daniela was to sell newspaper. Daniela is a beautiful girl, a rebel and a fighter, raised in one of the poorest neighborhoods; and Santiago, the son of millionaires, a young man who does not have any clear aims in his life.

But not everything will be fine, as Santiago's family opposed the relationship, not only by social differences, but by a tragic past that surrounds them. The tragic past is the brutal murder of Daniela's mother, twenty years ago. It was Horatio, Santiago's father who committed the crime, but the blame is on Diego, Daniela's father. The latter is sent to jail for twenty years.

Daniela is a girl who perseveres a lot. She works as a secretary, but the chief of the company wants her and even tries to rape her. In fact, they met when Daniela was in trouble. She was selling newspapers and hit the car with a coin, but it was her future company's manager who helped her. Daniela later gets pregnant with twins by the man she loves, Santiago. This happened after they had sex in a hotel. Paulina later discovers that she is the sister of Sandra, the girl in love with Santiago. In the past, Paulina's father raped her mother, and she gave birth to Paulina. Father Vincent is killed. Michaela has to put Horatio in favor and betrays Diego, who is in fact not the murderer of the mother of Daniela.

== Cast ==
=== Protagonists ===
- Alejandra Lazcano - Daniela Montenegro "La Diabla" in love with Santiago, daughter of Diego
- Cristóbal Lander - Santiago Fontaner in love with Daniela, son of Rebeca, stepson of Horacio

=== Secondary casts ===
- Rafael Sánchez Navarro - Horacio Rodríguez, villain, stepfather of Santiago
- Leonardo Daniel - Diego Montenegro father of Daniela
- Claudia Álvarez - Santa Madrigal, villain, in love with Santiago, hates Daniela, daughter of Luisa
- Gabriela Roel - Carmen
- Gina Morett - Otilia
- Gaston Melo - Pepino
- Elvira Monsell - Micaela
- Armando Torrea - Antonio "Tony" Rodríguez
- Pía Watson - Karina Rodríguez, sister of Santiago and Tony, daughter of Horacio and Rebeca
- Carla Carrillo - María Angélica "Pelusa" Soto, best friend of Daniela
- Héctor Arredondo - Luciano Enriquez , best friend of Santiago, in love with Daniela
- María José Magán - Adriana, in love with Santiago
- Alejandra Maldonado - Rebeca, mother of Santiago, Tony and Karina
- Javier Díaz Dueñas - Padre Vicente "Chente" Rocha
- María Rebeca - Yadira Soto, mother of Maria Angelica
- Abel Fernando - Fermín
- Juan Carlos Martín Del Campo - Agustín
- Wendy de los Cobos - Luisa, mother of Santa
- Alan Ciangherotti - Chuy
- Ana Gaby - Cuquita
- José Eduardo - Chebo
- Mauricio Ajas Ham - Ángel
- Karen Sentíes - Chimirra
