= Sólo para Mujeres =

Mexican theater play

Sólo Para Mujeres ("Just For Women") is a Mexican theatre play that has been running for about a decade (as of 2005). The show was inspired by the 1997 British film The Full Monty.

Sólo Para Mujeres came after the success of its predecessor, Sólo Para Hombres ("Just for Men"), a play that starred Lorena Herrera, among others, and which came about after Herrera's participation in the famous telenovela, Dos mujeres, un camino. Sólo Para Hombres featured Herrera and other famous Mexican actresses dancing on stage in revealing outfits. Sólo Para Mujeres followed the same theme: muscular actors would dance for an audience consisting mainly of women, wearing underwear only or suggestive clothing.

Although Televisa, Mexico's largest television network, is not directly connected with the play, many of the actors who worked on Sólo Para Mujeres had previous experience acting in soap operas for the network: among them are Alexis Ayala, Jorge Salinas, Sergio Sendel, Alfonso de Nigris and the play's producer, Sergio Mayer. Johnny Lozada, a former member of the Puerto Rican boy band Menudo, also participated in the play for a number of years.

The play was not expected to be as successful as Sólo Para Hombres was: Mexico, as with most of Latin America, still has a society with relatively machista views, and so the first expectations for Sólo Para Mujeres were that it would last, at most, a couple of years. However, the Sólo Para Mujeres play managed to outlast Sólo Para Hombres.

== Cast ==
Timbiriche

- Benny Ibarra as himself
- Erik Rubin as himself
- Sasha Sokol as herself
- Mariana Garza as herself
- Paulina Rubio as herself
- Diego Schoening as himself

Menudo

- Charlie Massó
- Johnny Lozada
- Ricky Meléndez
- René Farrait
- Ray Reyes

El Señor de los Cielos & Falsa Identidad Cast

- Fernanda Carrillo as Mònica Robles
- Guy Ecker aa Joe Navarro
- Francisco Gattorno as Gustavo Casasola
- Eduardo Yañez as Don Mateo Corona
- Sergio Goyri as Gavino Goana
- Azela Robinson as Ramona

La Piloto Cast

- Mauricio Aspe as Arley Mena
- Lisardo as Vasily Kilichenko
- Tommy Vásquez as Arnoldo Santamaría

Mi Marido Tiene + Familia & Una Familia Con Suerte Cast

- Silvia Pinal as Imelda Sierra de Córcega
- Rafael Inclan as Eugenio Córcega
- René Casados as Audifaz Córcega
- Marco Muñoz as Tulio Córcega
- Gaby Platas as Ampola Polita Casteñeda
- Carmen Salinas as Crisanta Díaz
- Emilio Osorio as Aristóteles Córcega
- Joaquín Bondoni as Cuauhtémoc "Temo" López
- Laura Viganti as Daniela Córcega
- Pablo Lyle as Pepe
- Marcos Montero as Ignacio Meneses
- Jessica Coch as Marisol Córcega
- Yahir as Xavi Galán
- Fedrico Ayos as
- Gonzalo Vega Jr. as Axel Legorreta Córcega
- Lola Merino as Ana Romano
- Germán Bracco as Guido
- Azúl Guaita as Yolotl Rey
- José Pablo Alanís as Andy Rey
- José Manuel Alanís as Santi Rey
- Juan Diego Covarrubias

Sin Senos Sí Hay Paraíso Cast

- Carolina Galtán as Catalina Marín
- Robert Manrique as Santiago Sanín
- Javier Jattin as Tony Campana
- Francisco Bolivar as José Luis Vargas
- Luis Pablo Llano as Daniel Cerón

Por Amar Sin Ley Cast

- Ana Brenda Contreras as Alejandra Ponce
- Julian Gil as Carlos Ibarra
- José María Torre as Roberto Morelli
- Sergio Basañez as Gustavo Soto
- Altair Jarabo as Victoria Escalante
- Guillermo García Cantú as Alonso Vega
- Pablo Valentín as Benjamin Acosta
- Kimberly Dos Ramos as Sofía Alcócer
- Moisés Arizmendi as Alan Páez
- Geraldine Bazán as Elena Fernández
- Víctor García as Juan Lopez
- Marco Méndez as Javier Rivas

== Seasons ==
=== All Stars (Season One) ===
- Alexis Ayala
- Sergio Mayer
- Raúl Magaña
- Juan Carlos Casasola
- Jorge Salinas
- German Gutierrez
- Juan Carlos "Chao" Nieto
- Eduardo Rivera
- Arturo Vazquez
- Hugo Acosta
- Eduardo Rivera

=== Evolution (Season 2) ===
- Roberto Asad
- Poncho De Nigris
- Armando Gonzalez
- Manuel Landeta
- Latin Lover
- Xavier Ortiz
- Eduardo Rodriguez
- Sergio Mayer
- Marco Mendez

=== Reloaded (Season 3) ===
- Ferdinando Valencia
- Juan Carlos Franzoni
- Jorge Boyoli
- Tony Vela
- Pepe Gamez
- Marco Corleone
- Felipe Sánchez
- Juan Carlos "Chao" Nieto
- Clever
- Arturo Vázquez
- Latin Lover
- Sergio Mayer

=== Limited Edition (Season 4) ===
- David Zepeda as David Ladesma
- Juan Vidal
- Latin Lover
- Jorge Aravena
- Eleazar Gómez
- Javier Gómez
- Emmanuel Palomares
- Nacho Casano
- Juan Ángel Esparza
- Eduardo Rodríguez
- José Carlos Farrera
- César Urena
- Rafael Nieves
- Charly López
- Raúl Coronado
- Edu Moñuz
- Ezequiel Meilutis
- Ricardo Crespo
- Marcos Montero
- Ramiro Fumazoni
- Ricardo Franco
- David Ortega

== Motorcycle accident ==
On May 5, 2005, during the filming of a video at a Mexico City street, a man who was allegedly driving over the speed limit drove into the scene and crashed his car against the motorcycles used by five members of the Sólo Para Mujeres play, killing actor Édgar Ponce and injuring three others.

Some publicly expressed doubts are the fact that the street had not been closed before the filming of the video, and also that the members of Sólo Para Mujeres were not provided with protective helmets before getting on their motorcycles. Also, driving motorcycles on the street where the accident happened is prohibited by the law.

Members of the play stated that they didn't know driving motorcycles was prohibited on the particular street where the accident happened, because they had passed there on their bikes before and no one had admonished them for it. On the other hand, the man who drove the car into the motorcycles was released on bond until the case was seen at a Mexican court. Sergio Mayer demonstrated great displeasure when given the news that the man was no longer in jail.

== Activities in 2005 ==
Sólo Para Mujeres toured the United States with presentations in Atlanta, Las Vegas, Los Angeles, Phoenix, and Miami.
