= Giovanna Andrade =

Ecuadorian actress and television presenter

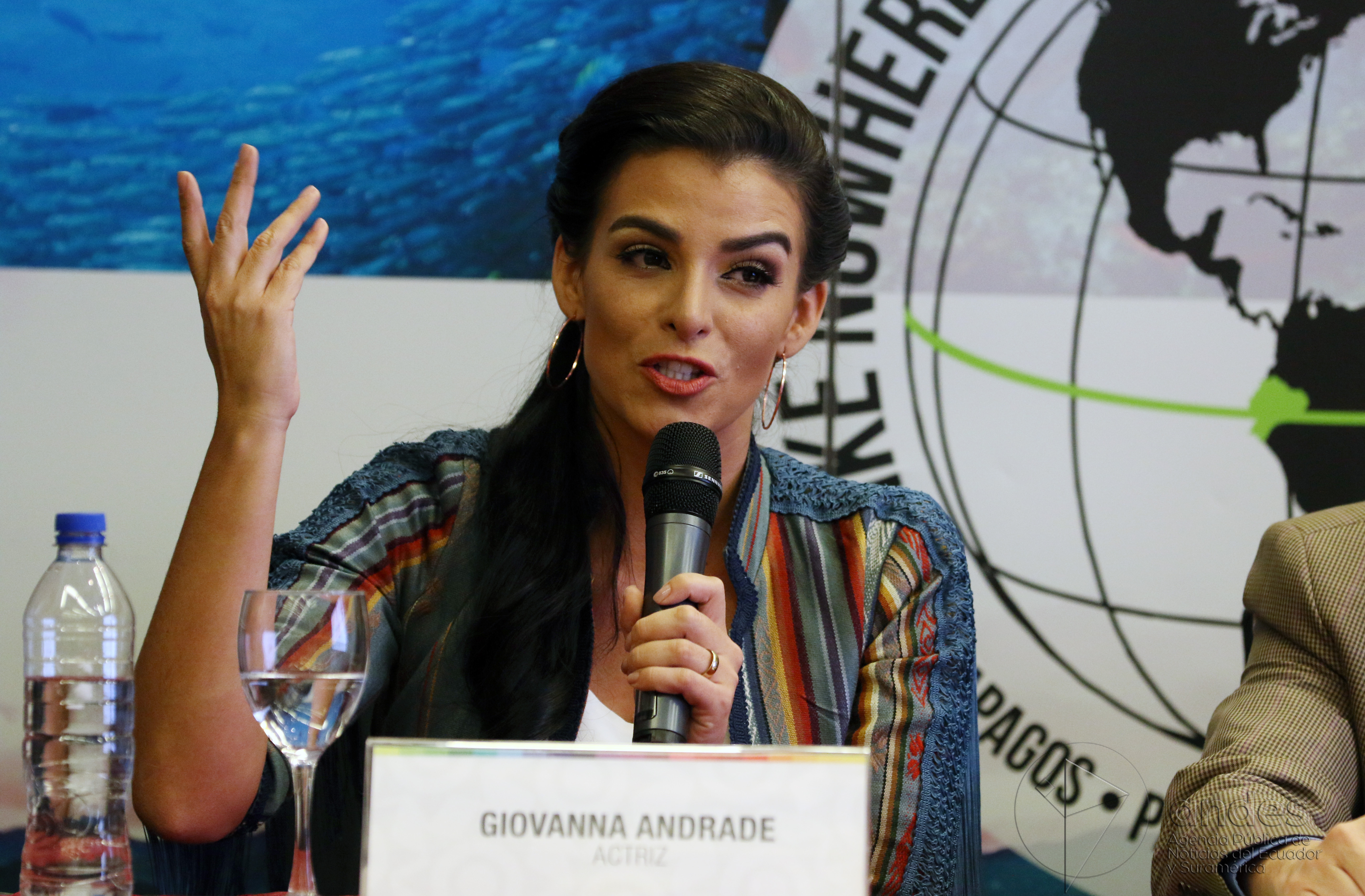
- Born: Giovanna Antonella Andrade Franco; October 7, 1985 (age 39); Guayaquil, Ecuador
- Occupation(s): Actress, presenter

Giovanna Antonella Andrade Franco (born October 7, 1985) is an Ecuadorian actress and television presenter, known for her roles in telenovelas such as La novela del Cholito and Yo vendo un ojos negros.

== Biography ==
Giovanna Andrade was born in Guayaquil on October 7, 1985. She began her television career in 2004, making her debut as the protagonist in the telenovela Yo vendo un ojos negros for the Ecuavisa network. After finishing recording, she decided to dedicate herself to acting, and to continue her training at the Lee Strasberg Theatre Institute in New York, but this plan was interrupted when she experienced a difficult pregnancy. She instead attended a theater workshop with Mexican actress Martha Zavaleta in Florida.

She returned to Ecuador in 2006, and a year later she starred in the successful La novela del Cholito for Ecuavisa, where she played "La Niña" María Gracia.

In 2008, Andrade made her film debut in the Ecuadorian drama Retazos de vida, along with Érika Vélez, Christian Bach, María Teresa Guerrero, and William Levy. Between 2009 and 2010, she settled in Peru, where she appeared in the TV series El Enano, Grupo Puro Corazón, and Broders. At the same time, she joined the Peruvian telenovela Los Barriga.

She returned to Ecuadorian television in 2010, on the second season of La pareja feliz on Teleamazonas. The same year, she reprised the character of "La Niña" María Gracia on Mostro de Amor, a continuation of La novela del Cholito. In 2011, she starred in the music video for "No me pidas tiempo" by the Guayaquil singer Daniel Beta. In 2011, she moved to Canal Uno, where she hosted the morning show Divinas. Later, she joined the Telerama network, where she hosted the programs N 'Boga and De mujer a mujer. In 2013, she made a guest appearance on the comic series ¡Así pasa! on Ecuavisa.

In 2016, Andrade returned to Ecuavisa as host of the program Desde casa, for network's international broadcast. The same year she had a starring role in the first season of the telenovela La Trinity. In 2017, she was chosen to star in the music video "Si tu la ves", by reggaeton singers Nicky Jam and Wisin, which was recorded in several cities in Ecuador with the support of the Ministry of Tourism.

In 2018, she signed an exclusive contract with the Colombian network RCN Televisión, making her debut on the second season of the telenovela Heart's Decree. Later she joined the series El final del paraíso.

In 2019, Andrade announced through social networks that she would be part of a beauty contest called Mrs. Globe in Shenzhen, China, representing Ecuador. She participated with 71 other candidates from different countries. During the gala, she wore a typical costume inspired by the Ecuadorian mountains, and was chosen vice-queen of the contest. Later, due to differences with organizers, she gave up the title and her crown.

== Filmography ==
- Yo vendo un ojos negros (2004) ... María Ochoa
- La novela del Cholito (2007–2008) ... María Gracia Echeverría "La Niña"
- Broders (2009) ... Paola
- El Enano (2009) ... Sirenita
- Los Barriga (2009) ... Ivonne
- Puro Corazón (2009) ... Roxana
- Mostro de Amor (2010) ... María Gracia Echeverría "La Niña"
- La pareja feliz (2010) ... Blanquita
- ¡Así pasa! (2013) ... Rebeca
- El más querido (2016) ... Teresa
- La Trinity (2016–2017) ... Roxana "Rochi"
- Kiquirimiau (2017) ... Lucía
- Heart's Decree 2 (2018–2019) ... Macarena Soler
- El final del paraíso (2019) ... Marcela Pinzón

=== TV programs ===
- Divinas (2011), Canal Uno
- De mujer a mujer (2012–2015), Telerama
- N' Boga (2012–2015), Telerama
- Desde casa (2016–present), Ecuavisa Internacional

=== Film ===
- Retazos de vida (2008) ... Andrea

=== Music videos ===
- "No me pidas tiempo" by Daniel Beta (2011)
- "Si tú la ves" by Nicky Jam and Wisin (2017)
