= Mauricio Ochmann =

American and Mexican actor

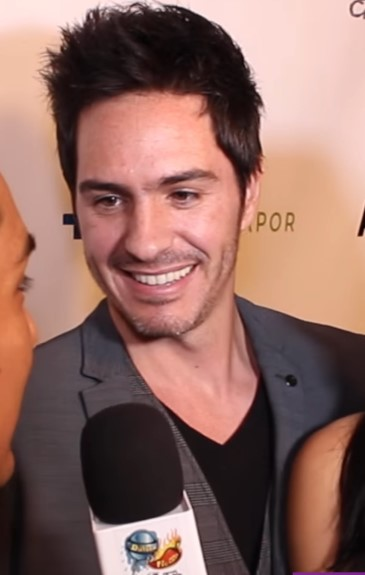
- Ochmann in 2016
- Born: November 16, 1977 (age 48); Washington D.C., U.S.
- Citizenship: United States; Mexico
- Occupation: Actor
- Years active: 1997–present
- Spouses: María José del Valle Prieto (m. 2003; div. 2008) Aislinn Derbez (m. 2016; div. 2020)
- Children: 2

Mauricio Ochmann (born November 16, 1977) is an American and Mexican actor best known for his roles in telenovelas, such as Amarte Asi, where he starred as Ignacio "Nacho" Reyes. He also appeared in Kevin Costner's film Message in a Bottle, the TV series That's life and Latino Green. He appeared as Fabián Duque in Telemundo's Dame Chocolate. He starred as Victorino Mora in Telemundo's hit Victorinos and was the leading role in the Telemundo novela El Clon. He is also the star of El Chema a spin off of his character "Chema Venegas" from the hit television series El Señor de los Cielos.

== Early life ==
Mauricio Ochmann was born on November 16, 1977, in Washington, D.C., Ochmann never knew his biological parents and during his first years of life grew up with his adoptive mother, María, and her first husband, Guillermo, who finally divorced. After the separation, Mauricio and his mother moved to Mexico, where the actor's mother began a relationship with German Thomas Ochmann and lived with his brothers Thomas, Christian and Paulo. Years later Mauricio moved to Los Angeles, where he studied acting in Joanne Baron Studio of Santa Monica.

== Career ==
=== Early career (1997–2005) ===
From a young age, Mauricio showed interest in the performance by participating in various local activities and works, but it was at age 16 that he got his first professional opportunity on the TV show La Otra Cosa by Héctor Suárez. After studying in Los Angeles he got a small role in the movie Message in a Bottle, alongside actors like Kevin Costner and Robin Wright. After his first works, he returned to Mexico where actor and producer Humberto Zurita and his wife Cristian Bach give him the opportunity to star in his first telenovela with Bárbara Mori, titled Azul Tequila, which premiered in 1998. The following year he is chosen by Elisa Salinas to star in the telenovela Háblame de amor with Danna García. After entering in the television, decides to act in works of theaters and its first putting in scene was in "Equus" with which it obtains to several recognitions, among them the prize to "Actor Revelation in Theater" by the National Association of Theater Critics. In 2000 he returned to Los Angeles and participated in the series produced by Diane Ruggiero, entitled That's Life. At the end of this one returned to Mexico to act alongside Lorena Rojas in the telenovela Como en el cine (2001), for Televisión Azteca. In 2003, he participated in the telenovela Mirada de mujer, el regreso, sequel of Mirada de mujer. Also he was part of the cast of productions like Ladies' Night, in 2004 on 7 mujeres, 1 homosexual y Carlos, along to Adriana Fonseca, Rogelio Guerra, Luis Felipe Tovar and Ninel Conde. In 2005 he appeared in the thriller film, Ver, oír y callar, along to Luis Felipe Tovar and Paola Núñez. Also, with Litzy he protagonized the telenovela Amarte así, Frijolito, in the character of "Ignacio"; and in the film Tres, by Carlos Valdivia.

=== Critical success in telenovelas and films (2006–present) ===
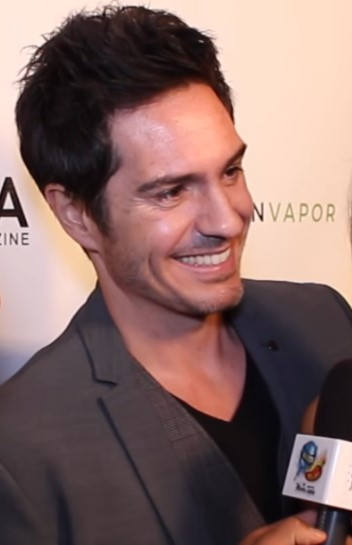
Ochmann in April 2016

Among his works are the telenovelas Dame chocolate and Marina which he abandoned because of addiction problems. In 2007 he participated in Victoria, in which he shared credits with Géraldine Bazán and Andrea López, among other artists; the melodrama was a remake of Señora Isabel and Mirada de mujer (1997), starring Angelica Aragón and Ari Telch. Between 2010 and 2011 i starred in the telenovelas Victorinos, remake of Cuando quiero llorar no lloro and that in turn is based on the book written by the Venezuelan author Miguel Otero Silva and El sexo débil along to Itatí Cantoral. Already in 2012, he stars in her last telenovela titled Rosa diamante, along with Carla Hernández, then the following year he entered the Telemundo series, El Señor de los Cielos, where he only appeared in the final episode of the first season, in the second and third season was promoted to main protagonist. Thanks to this series he was nominated several times in the annual awards of Telemundo. But it was at the 2015 ceremony where he won the "Best Bad Boy" award. After concluding his participation in the series, Mauricio began to dedicate himself to the cinema and to participate in publicity campaigns.

In 2015, he premiered his film A la mala; this was his first project with the woman he would marry in 2016, Aislinn Derbez. Also, in 2016, he appeared in the American series Easy. Later, he returned to play José María "Chema" Venegas in the series El Chema, a spin-off of the series El Señor de los Cielos. Thanks to this character, Mauricio has gained recognition in several parts of the world, receiving both positive and negative critiques, as the character is supposedly based on El Chapo.

More recently, the company had signed a first-look deal at Pantaya.

== Personal life ==
Ochmann has disclosed that he started consuming alcohol during childhood and his use increased with age, making him to consider suicide in 2006.

Ochmann has been married twice. His first marriage was to María José del Valle Prieto. They had a daughter named Lorenza in 2004, and divorced in 2008. His second marriage was to Aislinn Derbez, daughter of Eugenio Derbez. They met in 2014 while filming 'A la Mala', and married in 2016. They had a daughter named Kailani, born in 2018, and divorced in June 2020.

He has mostly recently been romantically linked to model Paulina Burrola on his social media.

== Filmography ==
Film roles
Year	Title	Roles	Notes
1999	Message in a Bottle	Mail Boy	
2003	Ladies' Night	Desflorador	
2004	7 mujeres, 1 homosexual y Carlos	Carlos	
2015	A la mala	Santiago	
2017	Hazlo como hombre	Raúl	
2018	Te juro que yo no fui	Ludwig Pérez	
2022	A Not So Merry Christmas	Jesús "Chuy" Padilla	
2022	¡Qué despadre!	Pedro	
2023	Friends Till Death	Nacho	
2024	Non Negotiable	Alan Bender	

Television roles
Year	Title	Roles	Notes
1997	La cosa	Mother's son	
1998–1999	Azul Tequila	Santiago Berriozábal	Main role; 64 episodes
1999–2000	Háblame de amor	Maximiliano	Main role; 124 episodes
2000	That's Life	Samuel	Episode: "Pilot"
2001–2002	Como en el cine	Javier Borja / Joaquín "Joaco" Borja	Main role; 245 episodes
2003–2004	Mirada de mujer, el regreso	José Chacón	Recurring role
2005	Amarte así, Frijolito	Ignacio "Nacho" Reyes	Main role; 119 episodes
2006	Marina	Ricardo Alarcón Morales #1	Main role; 168 episodes
2007	Decisiones	Federico	Episode: "Paraíso artificial"
2007	Dame chocolate	Fabián Duque	Recurring role
2007–2008	Victoria	Jerónimo Ernesto Acosta	Main role
2009	Victorinos	Victorino Mora	Main role; 152 episodes
2010	El clon	Lucas Ferrer / Diego Ferrer / Osvaldo Daniel	Main role; 182 episodes
2011	El sexo débil	Julián Camacho	Main role; 182 episodes
2012–2013	Rosa diamante	José Ignacio Altamirano	Main role; 129 episodes
2012	Capadocia	Iker	Episode: "La paz y la espada"
2013–2015	El Señor de los Cielos	José María "Chema" Venegas	Guest role (season 1); main role (seasons 2–3); 190 episodes
2016	Easy	Martin	Episode: "Controlada"
2016–2017	El Chema	José María "Chema" Venegas	Main role (season 1); 84 episodes
2019	De viaje con los Derbez	Himself	
2020	R	Francisco "Franco" Barrón	Main role; 10 episodes
2025	Papá soltero	César	Main role; 10 episodes

== Stage ==
- El Graduado (Mexican production of The Graduate, 2004)
- Equus (2000) as Alan
- Sueños de Juventud as Carlos
- Profanación
- Medicos a Palos as Bartolome
- La dama del alba
- El juicio as Judge
- Veintidós, Veintidós

== See also ==
- Lorena Rojas
