= Sergio Mayer =

Mexican actor and politician (born 1966)

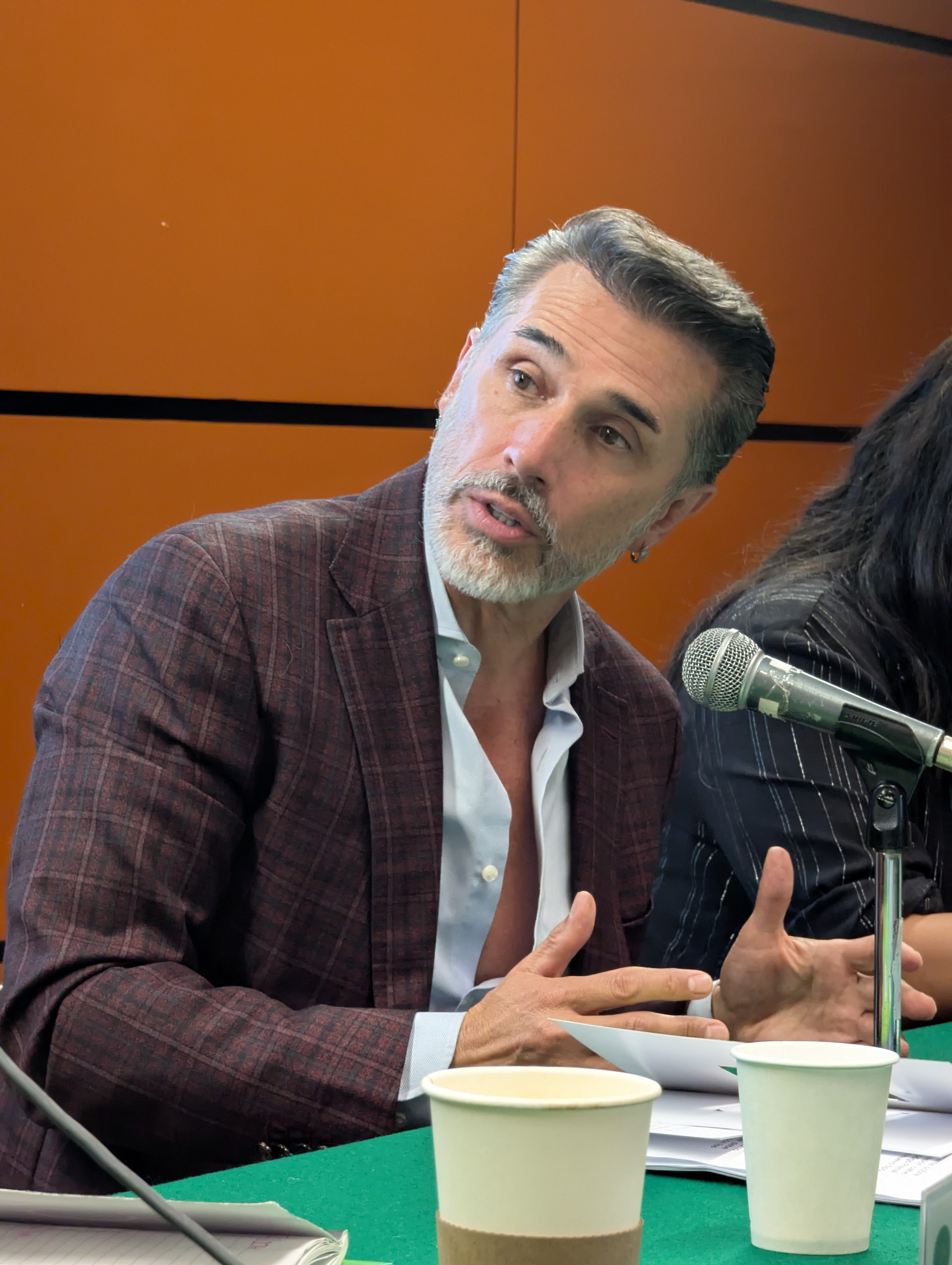

Member of the Congress of the Union for the 6th district of Mexico City
- In office September 1, 2018 – August 31, 2021
- Preceded by: Jesús Emiliano Álvarez López
- Succeeded by: Diana Lara Carreón

Personal details
- Born: Sergio Mayer Bretón; May 21, 1966 (age 60) Mexico City, Mexico
- Spouse: Issabela Camil (m. 2009)
- Domestic partner: Barbara Mori (1996–1998)
- Children: 3
- Occupation: Exotic dancer, actor, singer, host and politician

Sergio Mayer Bretón (born May 21, 1966) is a Mexican actor, singer, producer, politician, and former chippendale. Born in Mexico City, he served as a federal deputy during the 64th Congress (2018–2021).

== Biography ==
Mayer started his career in 1982 in a group called Chévere Internacional, which he belonged to for 4 years. With the group, he toured all over Latin America and the United States. Once the tour ended, he returned to Mexico to complete his Business Administration degree at the Universidad Iberoamericana.

During that time he made commercials and fashion runways. He was invited to participate in the Heraldo awards as a dancer.

Luis de Llano liked what he saw and invited him to participate in the Garibaldi group project.

With the same producer, he worked in the shows Papá Soltero and La Edad de Oro, and made various appearances as a conductor.

He takes acting classes with Sergio Jiménez and Rita Macedo. In 1996, he played in the soap opera Confidente de Secundaria. In TV Azteca, he was the artistic director and producer of many programs, plus being the creator of CEFAC.

Later he created the concept of Solo Para Mujeres with Alexis Ayala. He combined his singing and acting activities with his business and artistic representation with Espectaculos Mayer. Solo Para Mujeres "Only for Women" is a male strip show where many male models, including him, take off their clothes in public and show nothing but a thong. He has made videos of these performances, one of which has been out on DVD in 2009.

In May 2004, he decided to take part in the second chapter of Big Brother VIP in its third edition; in which he ended in second place, beaten only by Roxana Castellanos. He has a son with actress Bárbara Mori, Sergio Jr.

In May 2005, while filming for a commercial in Mexico City, Mayer and several others of the cast survived an accident when a car driven under the influence hit their motorcade, hitting Mayer and three other actors. Édgar Ponce, one of the actors involved in the accident, died in hospital a day later.

In March 2007, he appeared in the music video for Ivy Queen's hit single "Que Lloren".

=== Election as federal deputy ===
In 2018, Mayer ran as the Juntos Haremos Historia candidate for federal deputy for Mexico City's 6th federal electoral district and won with more than 40 percent of the vote. He sought re-election for the same district in the 2021 mid-terms but lost to Diana Lara Carreón of the National Action Party (PAN).

He returned to Congress in the 2024 general election as a plurinominal deputy for the National Regeneration Movement (Morena).

== Filmography ==
Year	Title	Role	Note
2026	La casa de los famosos USA	Houseguest	20th place; season 6
2024	La isla: desafío extremo	Contestant	Quit; season 1
2023	La casa de los famosos México	Houseguest	4th place; season 1
2014–16	Como dice el dicho	Edmundo / Eduardo Castro	TV series
2012–13	Qué bonito amor	Bruno Moreli	Supporting role
2012	Abismo de pasion	Paolo Landucci	Supporting role
2010	Hasta Que el Dinero Nos Separe	Johnny Alpino "El Catrin"	Guest star
2009	Mil Mañeras De Morir	Himself	Episode: "Death: A User's Manual"
2008–09	Un gancho al corazón	Fernando de la Rosa	Guest star
2008	Fuego en la sangre	Román	Guest star
2008	Juro que te amo	Productor	Guest star
2007	"Que Lloren"	Himself	Music Video
2006–07	La fea más bella	Luigi Lombardi	Supporting role
2005	Vecinos	Mauricio	TV series
2005	La Madrastra	Carlos Sánchez	Supporting role
2004	Desnudos	Michel	Film
2001	Como en el cine	Daniel Lebrija	Main role
1996	Confidente de secundaria	Erick	Supporting role
