= List of Por amar sin ley episodes =

Por amar sin ley (English title: Laws of love) is a Mexican telenovela produced by José Alberto Castro that premiered on Las Estrellas on 12 February 2018. It is a remake of a 2016 Colombian telenovela La ley del corazón. The telenovela revolves around the personal life and work of a group of lawyers belonging to a prestigious law firm.

== Series overview ==
| Series | Episodes | Originally released | |
| Series | Episodes | First released | Last released |
|---|---|---|---|
| 1 | 92 | 12 February 2018 | 17 June 2018 |
| 2 | 91 | 3 March 2019 | 5 July 2019 |

== Episodes ==
=== Season 1 (2018) ===
| No. overall | No. in season | Title | Original release date | Mexico viewers (millions) |
|---|---|---|---|---|
| 1 | 1 | "La boda de Alejandra y Carlos es interrumpida por la policía" | 12 February 2018 | 3.1 |
| 2 | 2 | "Alejandra sufre la infidelidad de Carlos" | 13 February 2018 | 2.7 |
| 3 | 3 | "Leonardo es herido de gravedad" | 14 February 2018 | 2.5 |
| 4 | 4 | "Carlos se niega a perder el amor de Alejandra" | 15 February 2018 | 2.7 |
| 5 | 5 | "Roberto se acuesta con la novia de Leonardo" | 17 February 2018 | 2.7 |
| 6 | 6 | "Ricardo le hace una propuesta a Alejandra" | 19 February 2018 | 2.6 |
| 7 | 7 | "Roberto se siente culpable de engañar a Leonardo" | 20 February 2018 | 3.0 |
| 8 | 8 | "Victoria se entera que Rocío está muerta" | 21 February 2018 | 2.8 |
| 9 | 9 | "Alejandra le roba el puesto a Leticia" | 22 February 2018 | 3.2 |
| 10 | 10 | "Gustavo tiene una amante" | 23 February 2018 | 2.8 |
| 11 | 11 | "Ricardo evita que Paula vaya a la cárcel" | 26 February 2018 | 3.0 |
| 12 | 12 | "Leonardo y Roberto vuelven a ser amigos" | 27 February 2018 | 2.9 |
| 13 | 13 | "Elena le prohíbe a Ricardo que siga viendo a sus hijos" | 28 February 2018 | 2.7 |
| 14 | 14 | "Leticia manipula a Elena" | 1 March 2018 | 3.0 |
| 15 | 15 | "Milena destruye el matrimonio de Gustavo" | 2 March 2018 | 2.9 |
| 16 | 16 | "Victoria logra hacer justicia" | 5 March 2018 | 2.5 |
| 17 | 17 | "Juan se enfrenta a Roberto" | 6 March 2018 | 2.7 |
| 18 | 18 | "Ricardo y Alejandra se dan su primer beso" | 7 March 2018 | 2.7 |
| 19 | 19 | "Leonardo y Roberto sospechan de Alan" | 8 March 2018 | 2.8 |
| 20 | 20 | "Juan se integra al bufete Vega y Asociados" | 9 March 2018 | 2.9 |
| 21 | 21 | "Alan se hace cargo del caso de Nora" | 12 March 2018 | 2.9 |
| 22 | 22 | "Carlos se harta de la incompetencia de Alan" | 13 March 2018 | 2.7 |
| 23 | 23 | "Inicia el juicio de Carlos" | 14 March 2018 | 2.8 |
| 24 | 24 | "Carlos le pide otra oportunidad a Alejandra" | 15 March 2018 | 3.3 |
| 25 | 25 | "Inicia la pelea por el amor de Alejandra" | 16 March 2018 | 3.1 |
| 26 | 26 | "Carlos desconfía de su propio primo" | 19 March 2018 | 2.7 |
| 27 | 27 | "Alejandra rechaza la propuesta de Carlos" | 20 March 2018 | 2.9 |
| 28 | 28 | "Olivia denuncia el robo de Arturo" | 21 March 2018 | 3.2 |
| 29 | 29 | "Leticia quiere su propio bufete" | 22 March 2018 | 3.1 |
| 30 | 30 | "Alejandra explota contra Carlos y termina su noviazgo" | 23 March 2018 | 2.7 |
| 31 | 31 | "Carlos acepta un sucio negocio" | 26 March 2018 | 2.8 |
| 32 | 32 | "Roberto logra que Nora obtenga su libertad" | 27 March 2018 | 2.9 |
| 33 | 33 | "Victoria gana el caso de Sol" | 28 March 2018 | 2.9 |
| 34 | 34 | "Inicia el juicio de Alberto" | 29 March 2018 | 2.4 |
| 35 | 35 | "Fanny le pide ayuda a Roberto" | 30 March 2018 | 2.2 |
| 36 | 36 | "Alejandra logra ayudar al Sr. Pérez" | 2 April 2018 | 2.9 |
| 37 | 37 | "Asaltante atropellado" | 3 April 2018 | 3.1 |
| 38 | 38 | "Ricardo se enfrenta a los hijos de Joel" | 4 April 2018 | 3.0 |
| 39 | 39 | "Gustavo mira a Alejandra como una enemiga" | 5 April 2018 | 3.1 |
| 40 | 40 | "Alejandra prefiere seguir sola" | 6 April 2018 | 3.2 |
| 41 | 41 | "Ricardo pone fin a su relación con Alejandra" | 9 April 2018 | 3.1 |
| 42 | 42 | "Juan averigua cosas importantes sobre Tatiana" | 10 April 2018 | 3.0 |
| 43 | 43 | "El bufete de Vega se une por el caso de Alexa" | 11 April 2018 | 3.5 |
| 44 | 44 | "Olivia y Leticia se enfrentan a un caso de falsa publicidad" | 12 April 2018 | 3.1 |
| 45 | 45 | "Juan pide la ayuda de Tatiana" | 13 April 2018 | 3.1 |
| 46 | 46 | "Carlos renuncia a Alejandra para siempre" | 16 April 2018 | 3.0 |
| 47 | 47 | "Juan logra que Tatiana confiese la verdad" | 17 April 2018 | 3.1 |
| 48 | 48 | "La policía arresta a Octavio" | 18 April 2018 | 2.9 |
| 49 | 49 | "Ricardo busca reconquistar a Alejandra" | 19 April 2018 | 2.9 |
| 50 | 50 | "Alexa se niega a enfrentar a sus agresores" | 20 April 2018 | 3.1 |
| 51 | 51 | "Carlos le propone un jugoso negocio a Benjamín" | 23 April 2018 | 2.9 |
| 52 | 52 | "Alonso toma el caso de Alexa y promete hacer justicia" | 24 April 2018 | 2.8 |
| 53 | 53 | "Carlos asesora al juez Marrufo" | 25 April 2018 | 2.9 |
| 54 | 54 | "Un nuevo caso conmociona a Alejandra" | 26 April 2018 | 3.1 |
| 55 | 55 | "Carlos toma el caso de Imelda" | 27 April 2018 | 3.0 |
| 56 | 56 | "El Ciego enfurece contra Carlos" | 30 April 2018 | 2.3 |
| 57 | 57 | "Elena ya no quiere a Ricardo en su vida" | 1 May 2018 | 2.8 |
| 58 | 58 | "Elena busca el consuelo y la ayuda de Carlos" | 2 May 2018 | 2.9 |
| 59 | 59 | "Se hace justicia para Alexa" | 3 May 2018 | 3.3 |
| 60 | 60 | "Alejandra encara a Elena" | 4 May 2018 | 2.8 |
| 61 | 61 | "Juan salva a Tatiana" | 7 May 2018 | 2.9 |
| 62 | 62 | "Victoria quiere justicia para el Sr. Plutarco" | 8 May 2018 | 2.6 |
| 63 | 63 | "Leonardo enfurence porque Olivia sale con Alan" | 9 May 2018 | 2.6 |
| 64 | 64 | "Ricardo agrede a Carlos y Alejandra lo defiende" | 10 May 2018 | 2.0 |
| 65 | 65 | "El juicio de Imelda y Vicente inicia" | 11 May 2018 | 2.7 |
| 66 | 66 | "Leticia rompe toda relación con Benjamín" | 14 May 2018 | 2.5 |
| 67 | 67 | "Carlos y Ricardo se enfrentarán en nuevo caso" | 15 May 2018 | 2.6 |
| 68 | 68 | "Da inicio el juicio de Giselle" | 16 May 2018 | 2.7 |
| 69 | 69 | "Benjamín amenaza con renunciar" | 17 May 2018 | 2.5 |
| 70 | 70 | "Elena tiene un nuevo abogado" | 18 May 2018 | 2.9 |
| 71 | 71 | "Carlos inaugura la fundación" | 21 May 2018 | 2.6 |
| 72 | 72 | "Jaime decide analizar el caso de Jacinto Dorantes" | 22 May 2018 | 2.7 |
| 73 | 73 | "Los abogados llegan al congreso en Cancún" | 23 May 2018 | 2.5 |
| 74 | 74 | "Leonardo le declara su amor a Olivia" | 24 May 2018 | 2.8 |
| 75 | 75 | "Una noche mágica para Victoria y Roberto" | 25 May 2018 | 2.8 |
| 76 | 76 | "El Ciego y Jacinto Dorantes se hacen socios" | 28 May 2018 | 2.6 |
| 77 | 77 | "Karina descubre la infidelidad de Benjamín" | 29 May 2018 | 2.7 |
| 78 | 78 | "Elena sufre un accidente y su vida está en riesgo" | 30 May 2018 | 3.0 |
| 79 | 79 | "Jacinto acusa a Vega y Asociados de lavar dinero" | 31 May 2018 | 2.7 |
| 80 | 80 | "Alonso corre a Benjamín de Vega y Asociados" | 1 June 2018 | 2.9 |
| 81 | 81 | "El Ciego somete a Jacinto Dorantes" | 4 June 2018 | 2.9 |
| 82 | 82 | "Nuria mata a Daniela" | 5 June 2018 | 2.8 |
| 83 | 83 | "Juan y Fer vuelven a estar juntos" | 6 June 2018 | 2.9 |
| 84 | 84 | "Benjamín se entera que Alonso lo denunció" | 7 June 2018 | 3.0 |
| 85 | 85 | "Olivia termina su relación con Alan" | 8 June 2018 | 2.9 |
| 86 | 86 | "Elena aprende la lección y se muestra agradecida con Ricardo" | 11 June 2018 | 3.0 |
| 87 | 87 | "Alonzo reúne a todo su bufete para ayudar a Gustavo" | 12 June 2018 | 2.9 |
| 88 | 88 | "Benjamín es detenido por la policía" | 13 June 2018 | 3.4 |
| 89 | 89 | "Carlos es detenido y pierde a Alejandra" | 14 June 2018 | 3.0 |
| 90 | 90 | "Leonardo y Olivia dicen adiós a Vega y Asociados" | 15 June 2018 | 3.2 |
| 91 | 91 | "Isabel y Luis son asesinados" | 17 June 2018 | 5.8 |
| 92 | 92 | "Vega y Asociados continúa... y buscarán hacer justicia" | 17 June 2018 | 5.8 |

=== Season 2 (2019) ===
| No. overall | No. in season | Title | Original release date | Viewers (millions) |
|---|---|---|---|---|
| 93 | 1 | "Jacinto Dorantes manda matar a Alonso Vega" | 3 March 2019 (Note: Premiered early online through Las Estrellas website and YouTube channel on 28 February 2019.) | 3.1 |
| 94 | 2 | "Alejandra negocia la libertad de su padre con El Ciego" | 4 March 2019 | 3.2 |
| 95 | 3 | "Alejandra rescata a su padre" | 5 March 2019 | 3.3 |
| 96 | 4 | "Gustavo encuentra a Dorantes, ¿lo atrapará la justicia?" | 6 March 2019 | 3.1 |
| 97 | 5 | "Dorantes es detenido" | 7 March 2019 | 3.2 |
| 98 | 6 | "Carlos rechaza defender a Jacinto Dorantes" | 8 March 2019 | 2.9 |
| 99 | 7 | "Dorantes es asesinado" | 11 March 2019 | 3.1 |
| 100 | 8 | "¿Quién mató a Sergio Cervantes?" | 12 March 2019 | 3.2 |
| 101 | 9 | "Roberto tiene celos de Adrián" | 13 March 2019 | 2.9 |
| 102 | 10 | "Carlos y Ricardo pelean por Alejandra" | 14 March 2019 | 3.4 |
| 103 | 11 | "Alejandra rescata a los hijos de Miriam" | 15 March 2019 | 3.3 |
| 104 | 12 | "Alejandra gana el caso en Estados Unidos" | 18 March 2019 | 2.8 |
| 105 | 13 | "Nancy sospecha de los negocios turbios de Ibarra" | 19 March 2019 | 2.9 |
| 106 | 14 | "Victoria teme enamorarse de Roberto" | 20 March 2019 | 3.1 |
| 107 | 15 | "Julio es declarado culpable de parricidio" | 21 March 2019 | 3.2 |
| 108 | 16 | "Alejandro y Ricardo se besan, ¿regresarán?" | 22 March 2019 | 3.1 |
| 109 | 17 | "Victoria cacha a Roberto con otra mujer" | 25 March 2019 | 2.8 |
| 110 | 18 | "Alejandra y Ricardo hacen el amor" | 26 March 2019 | 3.0 |
| 111 | 19 | "Mónica confiesa su crimen" | 27 March 2019 | 3.1 |
| 112 | 20 | "Justicia por mano propia" | 28 March 2019 | 2.9 |
| 113 | 21 | "Carlos le pide a Alejandra ser su socia" | 29 March 2019 | 3.0 |
| 114 | 22 | "Ricardo y Alejandra van a vivir juntos" | 1 April 2019 | 2.8 |
| 115 | 23 | "Alejandra se infiltra en terreno peligroso" | 2 April 2019 | 3.0 |
| 116 | 24 | "Alejandra es la nueva socia de Vega y Asociados" | 3 April 2019 | 2.9 |
| 117 | 25 | "El Ciego incendia el bar del Gringo" | 4 April 2019 | 2.8 |
| 118 | 26 | "Mónica recipe una segunda oportunidad" | 5 April 2019 | 2.7 |
| 119 | 27 | "El Ciego manda matar a Alejandra" | 8 April 2019 | 2.9 |
| 120 | 28 | "Carlos sufre al no poder amar a Alejandra" | 9 April 2019 | 3.0 |
| 121 | 29 | "Alejandra recibe un impacto de bala" | 10 April 2019 | 2.9 |
| 122 | 30 | "Ricardo se culpa del accidente de Alejandra" | 11 April 2019 | 2.8 |
| 123 | 31 | "Vega y asociados unirán sus fuerzas" | 12 April 2019 | 2.7 |
| 124 | 32 | "Alejandra deja una voluntad anticipada" | 15 April 2019 | 2.5 |
| 125 | 33 | "Alejandra entra en crisis, ¿se salvará?" | 16 April 2019 | 3.2 |
| 126 | 34 | "Alejandra tiene muerte cerebral" | 17 April 2019 | 2.8 |
| 127 | 35 | "Desconectan a Alejandra" | 18 April 2019 | N/A |
| 128 | 36 | "Vega y Asociados buscará justicia para Alejandra" | 19 April 2019 | N/A |
| 129 | 37 | "Ricardo golpea al agente Quiroz" | 22 April 2019 | 2.6 |
| 130 | 38 | "Victoria gana el caso de Violeta y Aurora" | 23 April 2019 | 2.7 |
| 131 | 39 | "Carlos amenaza a Alan" | 24 April 2019 | 2.9 |
| 132 | 40 | "Carlos le pide a Nancy manipular las pruebas" | 25 April 2019 | 2.7 |
| 133 | 41 | "Cristina sufre acoso sexual" | 26 April 2019 | 2.6 |
| 134 | 42 | "Carlos quiere matar al Gringo" | 29 April 2019 | 3.0 |
| 135 | 43 | "Cristina es despedida" | 30 April 2019 | 2.7 |
| 136 | 44 | "Carlos y Nancy se dejan llevar por la pasión" | 1 May 2019 | 2.6 |
| 137 | 45 | "El Ciego quiere provocar al Gringo" | 2 May 2019 | 2.6 |
| 138 | 46 | "Fer termina con Juan" | 3 May 2019 | 2.7 |
| 139 | 47 | "La guerra aún no termina" | 6 May 2019 | 2.6 |
| 140 | 48 | "Carlos y El Ciego atacarán al Gringo" | 7 May 2019 | 2.7 |
| 141 | 49 | "Leonardo y Olivia se unen a Vega y asociados" | 8 May 2019 | 2.4 |
| 142 | 50 | "Cristina hace viral su acoso sexual" | 9 May 2019 | N/A |
| 143 | 51 | "Carlos cae en la trampa de Michelle Salgado" | 10 May 2019 | 2.0 |
| 144 | 52 | "El juicio de Cristina" | 13 May 2019 | 2.6 |
| 145 | 53 | "Roberto sospecha de Adrián" | 14 May 2019 | 2.6 |
| 146 | 54 | "Alan descubre el romance de Nancy y Carlos" | 15 May 2019 | 2.4 |
| 147 | 55 | "Crimen por racismo" | 16 May 2019 | 2.5 |
| 148 | 56 | "Enfermedad sin cura" | 17 May 2019 | 2.9 |
| 149 | 57 | "Sofía renuncia a Vega y asociados" | 20 May 2019 | 2.4 |
| 150 | 58 | "Justicia para los hermanos latinos" | 21 May 2019 | 2.3 |
| 151 | 59 | "¿Culpable o inocente?" | 22 May 2019 | 2.5 |
| 152 | 60 | "Asesina a sus propios hijos" | 23 May 2019 | 2.5 |
| 153 | 61 | "Roberto teme perder a Victoria para siempre" | 24 May 2019 | 2.7 |
| 154 | 62 | "Paternidad bajo engaño" | 27 May 2019 | 2.4 |
| 155 | 63 | "El mensaje del Ciego" | 28 May 2019 | 2.6 |
| 156 | 64 | "Roberto recibe la visita de una misteriosa mujer" | 29 May 2019 | 2.6 |
| 157 | 65 | "Roberto se reencuentra con su madre" | 30 May 2019 | 2.7 |
| 158 | 66 | "Alan asesina al licenciado Téllez" | 31 May 2019 | 2.5 |
| 159 | 67 | "Carlos sospecha que Alan mató a Téllez" | 3 June 2019 | 2.5 |
| 160 | 68 | "Carlos cae ante el encanto de Michelle" | 4 June 2019 | 2.5 |
| 161 | 69 | "La salud de la mamá de Sofía empeora" | 5 June 2019 | 2.7 |
| 162 | 70 | "El arresto de Alan" | 6 June 2019 | 2.4 |
| 163 | 71 | "Nancy intriga contra Alan" | 7 June 2019 | 2.6 |
| 164 | 72 | "Carlos corre a Alan de su vida para siempre" | 10 June 2019 | 2.4 |
| 165 | 73 | "¿Romance otoñal a la vista?" | 11 June 2019 | 2.7 |
| 166 | 74 | "El Gringo contraataca" | 12 June 2019 | 2.5 |
| 167 | 75 | "El verdadero asesino de Patricia" | 13 June 2019 | 2.7 |
| 168 | 76 | "Carlos manda silenciar a Alan" | 14 June 2019 | 2.4 |
| 169 | 77 | "La libertad es el principio de todo" | 17 June 2019 | 2.7 |
| 170 | 78 | "Carlos y Michelle hacen el amor" | 18 June 2019 | 2.7 |
| 171 | 79 | "Adrián está casado" | 19 June 2019 | 2.6 |
| 172 | 80 | "No todos los hombres son como tú" | 20 June 2019 | 2.8 |
| 173 | 81 | "Michelle y El Gringo pelean por Carlos" | 21 June 2019 | 2.6 |
| 174 | 82 | "El regreso de Benjamín" | 24 June 2019 | 2.7 |
| 175 | 83 | "Me vas a conocer como no te gustaría" | 25 June 2019 | 2.9 |
| 176 | 84 | "Nunca te voy a lastimar" | 26 June 2019 | 2.6 |
| 177 | 85 | "Elena le pide ayuda a Ricardo para controlar a su hijo" | 27 June 2019 | 2.9 |
| 178 | 86 | "Nicolás le exige a Lucía alejarse de Roberto" | 28 June 2019 | 2.6 |
| 179 | 87 | "Michelle asesina al Gringo" | 1 July 2019 | 2.6 |
| 180 | 88 | "Siempre me voy a preocupar por ti" | 2 July 2019 | 2.5 |
| 181 | 89 | "Antentado en Vega y asociados" | 3 July 2019 | 2.9 |
| 182 | 90 | "Siento algo muy fuerte por ti" | 4 July 2019 | 2.9 |
| 183 | 91 | "Justicia" | 5 July 2019 | 2.7 |
