= Laura Londoño =

Colombian actress (born 1988)

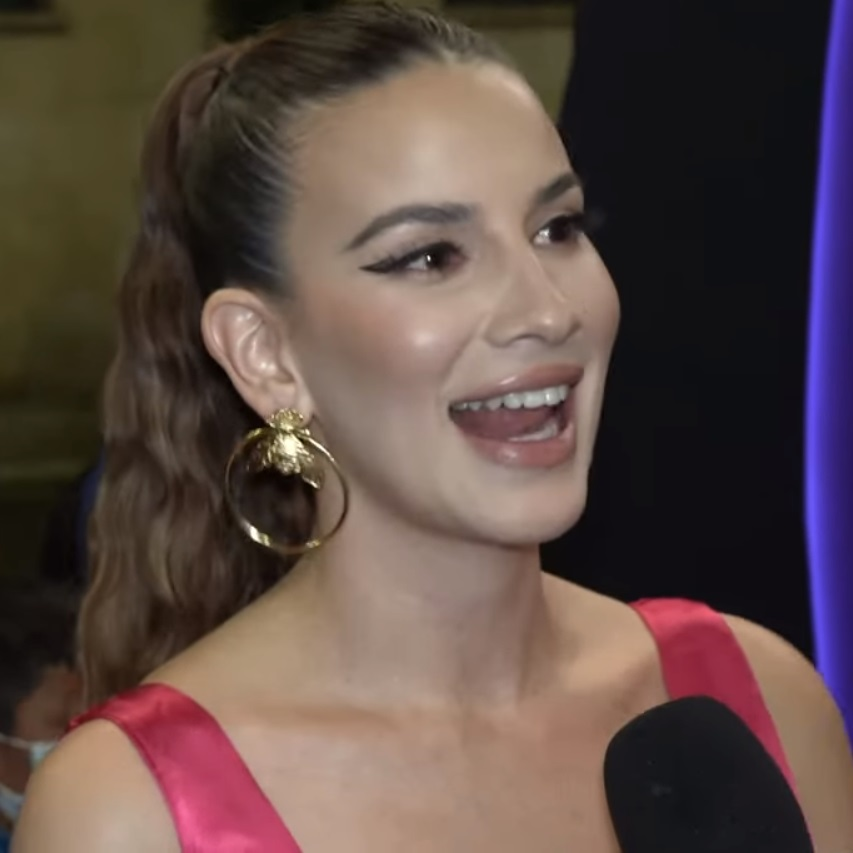
- Born: Laura Londoño Tapia; February 13, 1988 (age 38); Medellín, Colombia
- Citizenship: Colombian and Spanish
- Education: University of the Andes (Colombia) Lee Strasberg Theatre and Film Institute
- Occupations: Actress and model
- Years active: 2005–present
- Height: 1.70 m (5 ft 7 in)

Laura Londoño Tapia (born February 13, 1988) is a Colombian actress and model.

== Biography ==
=== Early life ===
Londoño began her modeling career at the age of 10, guided by renowned Colombian designer Ángel Yáñez. By the age of 16, she stood out with the French fashion agency Roxanne, participating in several streetwear fashion shows in Paris and becoming the fresh, youthful face of various magazine catalogs.

She completed her secondary education at Isolda Echavarría School in Medellín and went on to study architecture at the University of the Andes in Bogotá. Additionally, she studied acting for three years at the Lee Strasberg Theatre & Film Institute in New York City.

From an early age, Laura showed a strong inclination toward the arts. Until the age of 12, she took theater classes in Medellín. She also attended courses in painting, clay sculpting, and ceramics at the School of Fine Arts in Medellín. Furthermore, she studied singing, music theory, piano, and ballet. At age 13, she moved to Bogotá with her mother and brother. After some time, her family returned to Medellín, while she stayed in Bogotá to pursue her career independently.

In 2006, she auditioned for the Acting School of Caracol Television in Colombia, led by veteran actress Laura García, where she studied for two years.

=== Career ===
Londoño made her professional acting debut in 2006 in the telenovela Las profesionales, a su servicio, aired by Caracol Television. The plot revolves around a training company that prepares young women for domestic service, nursing, childcare, and companion roles. Laura portrayed one of the young women working in one of the households.

She then participated in Victoria, a telenovela produced by RTI Televisión for Telemundo, where she played the role of Elisa. The show aired in 2007 and was based on the earlier Mexican series Señora Isabel, later adapted as Mirada de mujer. The story centers on the love drama between Victoria and Jerónimo.

In 2008, she gave a notable performance in Sin senos no hay paraíso, a Telemundo production filmed in Mexico. She played Lina Arango, a young woman aspiring to become a model, who becomes entangled in the world of drug trafficking.

In 2011, she appeared in La bruja, a telenovela adapted from a work by Germán Castro Caycedo and broadcast by Caracol Television. Mostly filmed in Jardín, Antioquia, she portrayed Lina, the sweet and naive best friend of Amanda Mora, the lead character played by Flora Martínez.

Laura Londoño starred in the popular RCN series El Capo 2, alongside Marlon Moreno. She played Nicole, the daughter of the lawyer defending the drug lord.

In Rafael Orozco, el ídolo, she captured the hearts of many Colombians with her role as Silvia Duque—a lively, free-spirited hippie who becomes the singer's girlfriend in Bogotá after he moves from the department of Cesar to study in the capital. This role earned her nominations at the India Catalina Awards and TVyNovelas Awards for Best Antagonistic Role.

In Comando Élite (2013), a co-production by RCN Televisión and MundoFox, which depicts the Colombian police's fight against guerrilla leaders, paramilitaries, and drug traffickers, she played Paula Saravia, daughter of General Saravia, the head of the Intelligence Directorate, portrayed by Peruvian actor Salvador del Solar. Directed by Jorge Alí and Rodrigo Triana, the show featured Laura in a role for which she was again nominated for a TVyNovelas Award. Of her character, she said:

"I play a 16-year-old girl who is very rebellious and tries to get her father's attention and affection. He is a brilliant police officer, but she sees him as distant from the family, and that's what she reproaches him for."

In 2016 and 2018, she starred in the Colombian telenovela Heart's Decree alongside Luciano D'Alessandro. In 2021, she was cast as "La Gaviota" in the remake of Café con aroma de mujer. In addition to playing the lead role, Londoño also performed the soundtrack of the series.

== Filmography ==
=== Television ===
| Year | Title | Character | Role / Notes |
|---|---|---|---|
| 2025 | Yo no soy Mendoza | Laura Santander | Lead role; Telenovela |
| 2024 | MasterChef Celebrity | Herself | Guest Judge; Reality Show |
| 2023–2025 | Manes | Antonia Miranda | Lead role; TV Series |
| 2023 | MasterChef Celebrity | Herself | Contestant / Winner; Reality Show |
| 2023 | The Marked Heart (Season 2) | Lorena Williams | Main Cast; TV Series |
| 2021 | The Snitch Cartel: Origins | Constanza | Recurring Cast; Telenovela |
| 2021 | The Scent of Passion | Teresa Suárez "Gaviota" | Lead role; Telenovela |
| 2020 | De brutas, nada | Rosa | Special Guest; TV Series |
| 2018 | Paraíso Travel | Reina Acuña | Lead role; Telenovela |
| 2017 | Narcos (Season 3) | Katie | Recurring Cast; TV Series |
| 2016–2019 | Heart's Decree | Julia Escallón Correa | Lead role; Telenovela |
| 2016 | Bloque de búsqueda | Sergeant Olga Diez | Main Cast; Telenovela |
| 2015 | Cumbia Ninja (Season 3) | Jaqueline "Jackie" Cevallos | Recurring Cast; TV Series |
| 2013 | Comando Élite | Paula Saravia | Main Cast; Telenovela |
| 2012–2013 | Rafael Orozco, el ídolo | Silvia Duque | Supporting Role; Telenovela |
| 2012 | El Capo (Season 2) | Nicole Castro | Recurring Cast; Telenovela |
| 2011 | La bruja | Lina Bedoya | Main Cast; Telenovela |
| 2008 | El cartel (The Cartel) | Pilar Gutiérrez | Main Cast; Telenovela |
| 2008–2009 | Without Breasts There Is No Paradise | Lina Arango | Recurring Cast; Telenovela |
| 2007–2008 | Victoria | Elisa Ortíz | Main Cast; Telenovela |
| 2006–2007 | Las profesionales, a su servicio | — | Debut Role; Telenovela |

=== Film ===
| Year | Title | Character | Notes |
|---|---|---|---|
| 2020 | Forgotten We'll Be | Clara | Based on the book by Héctor Abad Faciolince |
| 2020 | Loco por vos | Lina Jaramillo | Romantic comedy |
| 2016 | Pablo | Andrea | — |
| 2015 | El último aliento | Karen | Drama about football fans and tragedy; set in Cúcuta |
| 2014 | Escobar: Paradise Lost | María Victoria | Hollywood production; co-starred with Benicio del Toro |
| 2013 | Lucille in the Sky | — | Short film |
| 2005 | Al rojo | — | — |

=== Theatre ===
Laura Londoño has also been active on stage. One of her most notable theatrical works is Simply the End of the World (Simplemente el fin del mundo), with which she represented Colombia at international festivals in countries such as Spain, Ireland, Germany, and Brazil. She also appeared in productions such as Tabú, Breve historia de un amor violento ("Brief Story of a Violent Love"), and El oso ("The Bear").

== Awards and nominations ==
=== TVyNovelas awards ===
| Year | Category | Series or Telenovela | Result |
|---|---|---|---|
| 2014 | Best Supporting Actress in a Series | Comando Élite | Nominated |
| 2017 | Best Leading Actress in a Telenovela | La ley del corazón | Winner |
| 2018 | Best Leading Actress in a Telenovela/Series | Paraíso Travel | Nominated |

=== India Catalina awards ===
| Year | Category | Series or Telenovela | Result |
|---|---|---|---|
| 2013 | Best Antagonist Actress in a Series | Rafael Orozco, el ídolo | Nominated |
| 2017 | Best Leading Actress in a Telenovela/Series | La ley del corazón | Nominated |
| 2019 | Best Leading Actress in a Telenovela/Series | La ley del corazón | Nominated |

== Personal life ==
Laura Londoño is currently married to Santiago Mora Bahamón, a cousin of Colombian television host Claudia Bahamón. The couple has two daughters: Allegra and Micaela.
