= Como en el cine =

Mexican telenovela

- Also known as: Un Amor Sin Remedio
- Created by: Veronica Suarez
- Developed by: Antulio Jimenez Pons
- Directed by: Antulio Jimenez Pons; Nestor Galvan
- Starring: Mauricio Ochmann, Lorena Rojas
- Opening theme: Season 1 (Episode 1-140) "Falsas esperanzas" by Christina Aguilera; Season 2 (Episode 140-end) "Love Colada" by OV7
- Country of origin: Mexico
- Original language: Spanish
- No. of episodes: 245

Production
- Executive producer: Antulio Jimenez Pons
- Producers: Antulio Jimenez Pons; Elisa Salinas; Juan David Burns
- Editors: Jorge Monzon Lee; Carlos Olivares Alvarez
- Camera setup: Multi-camera
- Running time: 60 minutes

Original release
- Network: Azteca Trece
- Release: April 30, 2001 – April 5, 2002

Related
- El amor no es como lo pintan; Súbete a mi moto

Como en el Cine is a Mexican telenovela produced by TV Azteca in 2001. Created by Veronica Suarez, it was directed, produced and executive produced by Don Antulio Jimenez Pons. Lorena Rojas and Mauricio Ochmann are the main characters.

== Plot ==
Isabel lives a double life. She pretends to be a successful psychologist when in reality she is a dancer in a bar by night, a fact that she hides with the help of her friends. When she meets Javier, an attractive young man of good family, he falls in love only with Isabel, the successful professional, oblivious to her secret life. "Chabelita", the dancer, must therefore fight for the love of her life. Her situation puts Javier and Isabel into the precarious position of defending their love against the rigid rules imposed by society. Javier lives with his mother Nieves, who holds him responsible for his twin brother's death. But what Javier doesn't know is that his twin, Joaquin, is very much alive but has no memory of his childhood as part of the Borja family. Joaquin also falls for Isabel despite the fact of learning that his brother is also in love with her.

== Cast ==
| Actor | Character | Known as |
|---|---|---|
| Lorena Rojas | Isabel 'Chabela' Montero | Protagonist, dancer in Zu Zu's bar, Older sister of Rocio, Javier's love interest |
| Mauricio Ochmann | Javier Borja / Joaquin 'Joaqo' Borja | Protagonist, Isabel's love interest / Twin Brother of Javier, killed in a Hospital by Saúl |
| Olivia Collins | Susana 'Zu Zu' Ramírez | Bar owner, biological mother of Arturo |
| Ninel Conde | Helena Hernández 'Topacio (La Matadora)' | Villain, Dancer in Zu Zu's bar, ends in a brothel |
| Juan A. Baptista | Carlos Cordero 'Charlie' | Villain, cousin of Zu Zu, Trips while trying to hit La Matadora and dies |
| Úrsula Prats | Nieves Borja | Villain, Mother of Javier & Joaquin, killed by Saúl |
| Sergio Mayer | Daniel Lebrija | Villain, obsessed with Isabel, responsible for deaths of Lencha and Enrique, ends in a Mental Institution |
| Betty Monroe | Angela 'Rubi' | Dancer in Zu Zu's bar, friend of Isabel, daughter of Fidel, Billy's love interest |
| Ana La Salvia | Zafiro | Dancer in Zu Zu's bar, killed by La Matadora |
| Daniela Garmendia | Esmeralda | Dancer in Zu Zu's bar, Claudio's love interest |
| Alberto Mayagoitia | Billy Billetes | Rubi's love interest |
| Ángela Fuste | Bárbara Escalante | Villain but turns Good, Loved Javier, Marries Luis |
| Hugo Esquinca | Luis 'El Nacotlan' | Friend of Javier & Joaquin, Marries Barbara |
| Alberto Casanova | Raúl Benavides | Villain, responsible for death of Rocio, raped Barbara, later Regina, killed by Luis |
| José Ramón Escorza | Claudio 'Chipilo' | Friend of Javier, Esmeralda's love interest |
| José Luis Franco | Saúl Ramos 'Ojitos' | Villain, killed by Nieves |
| Arturo Beristáin | Francisco De La Riva | Husband of Gaby |
| Nubia Martí | Gabriela "Gaby" de De la Riva | Wife of Francisco |
| Eva Prado | Martha de Escalante | Wife of Julio, mother of Bárbara |
| Roberto Blandón | Julio Escalante | Villain. Husband of Martha, father of Bárbara, ends in jail |
| Alejandra Lazcano | Sofia Borja | Younger Half sister of Javier & Joaquin, Arturo's love interest |
| Pablo Azar | Arturo De La Riva | Adopted son of Gaby and Francisco, biological son of Zu Zu and Vicente, Sofia's love interest |
| Liz Gallardo | Rocio Montero | Villain. Younger sister of Isabel, has baby with Arturo, Killed by Raúl and Erika (Hit & Run) |
| Géraldine Bazán | Regina Linares / Amatista | Friend of Sofia, Gloria and Renata, Dancer in Zu Zu's bar |
| Mariana Torres | Gloria Fernandez | Friend of Sofia, Regina and Renata. Leonardo's love interest. |
| Dafne Padilla | Renata | Friend of Sofia, Regina and Gloria. Leobardo's love interest. |
| Alejandra Ley | Dolores Castillo 'Lola' | Enemy of Regina's group, Later becomes friends with them |
| Miguel A. Lomelin | Mauricio | Friend of Arturo |
| Carlos East Jr. | Leonardo | Twin brother of Leobardo. Gloria's love interest |
| Ernesto East | Leobardo | Twin brother of Leonardo. Renata's love interest |
| David Zepeda | Paco | Dancer in Zu Zu's bar, Perla's love interest |
| Simone Victoria | Lulu | Sister of Rosa, Zu Zu's Friend/Helper |
| Mario Sauret | Dr. Marco Antonio Moreli | Psychiatrist, Killed by Erika |
| Héctor Soberón | Enrique | Friend/Business partner of Javier, Killed by Daniel |
| Tomas Goros | Julian | Villain, father of Erika and Federico |
| Aline Hernández | Erika | Villain, killed her ex-husband. Ends in jail |
| Juan Vidal | Federico | Villain, Marries Nieves, Ends in Jail |
| Andrea Noli | Perla | Dancer in Zu Zu's bar, Paco's love interest |
| Surya MacGregor | Telma | |
| Alicia Bonet | Mother Maria | |
| Margot Wagner | Sister Mercedes | |
| Ramiro Orci | Gabino | Groundskeeper |
| Miguel Couturier | Vicente | Biological father of Arturo, killed by his assistant |
| Aarón Beas | Martin | Cousin of Rubi |
| Fidel Garriga | Fidel | Father of Rubi, Joaquin's cellmate/Friend |
| Regina Torné | Romualda | Villain, Aunt of Billy |
| América Gabriel | Gabriela | |
| Andrea Escalona | Malena | Friend of Lolita |
| Aracelia Chavira | Sister Faustina | |
| Beatriz Martínez | Azucena | Mother of Gloria |
| Bertha Kaim | Valeria | Friend of Bárbara |
| Guillermo Ayala | 'El chucky' | Villain, Javier's Kidnapper, Ends in Jail |
| Ángel Arellano | Manolo 'Manolete' | Friend of Charlie |
| Susana Salazar | Hilda | Cousin of Manolo |
| Angy Almanza | Alejandra | Friend of Lolita |
| Carmen Zavaleta | Sister Patricia | |
| Jorge Galvan | Evaristo | |
| José Luis Rojas | | |
| José Joel | Gerardo | |
| Julio Escalero | | |
| Mariana Urrutia | | Friend of Lolita |
| Rosalba Brambila | | |
| Xóchitl Illiana | | |

=== Special guest stars ===
- BOOM
- Elefante
- Lou Bega
- Moneda Dura
- OV7
- Sergio Dalma
- Uff

== Theme songs ==
- Falsas esperanzas
  Singer: Christina Aguilera
  Album: Mi Reflejo
  Written by: Jorge Luis Piloto
- Love Colada
  Singer: OV7
  Written by: Andy Marvel, Amy Powers, Marjorie Mayl
