= List of Por amar sin ley characters =

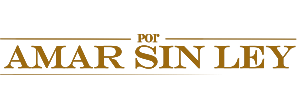

Por amar sin ley is a Mexican telenovela produced by José Alberto Castro that premiered on Las Estrellas on 12 February 2018. It is a remake of a 2016 Colombian telenovela La ley del corazón. The telenovela revolves around the personal life and work of a group of lawyers belonging to a prestigious law firm.

== Main characters ==
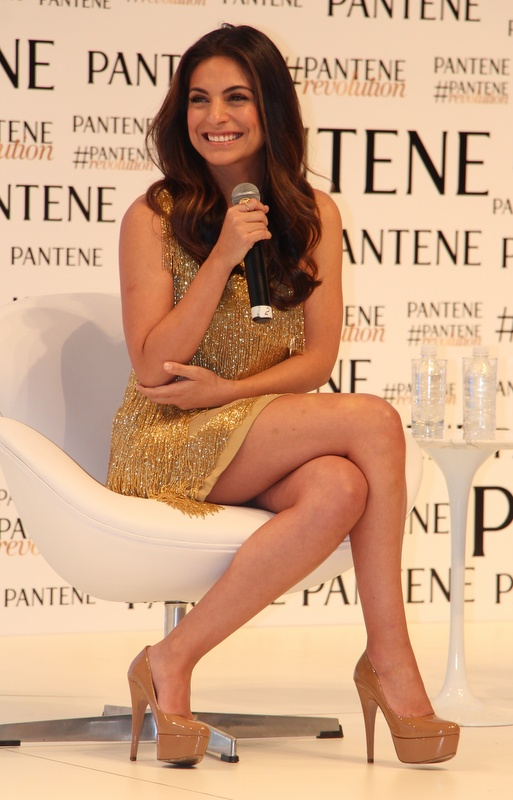
Ana Brenda Contreras stars as Alejandra Ponce

David Zepeda stars as Ricardo Bustamante

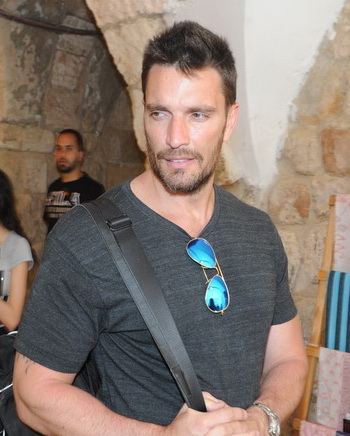
Julián Gil stars as Carlos Ibarra

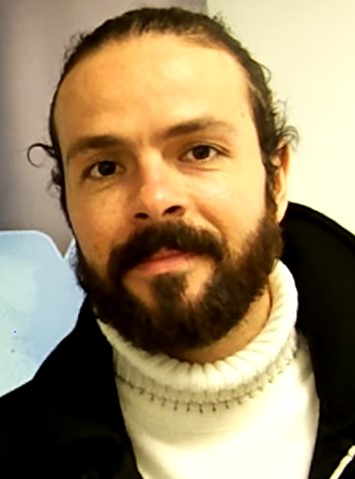
José María Torre Hütt stars as Roberto Morelli

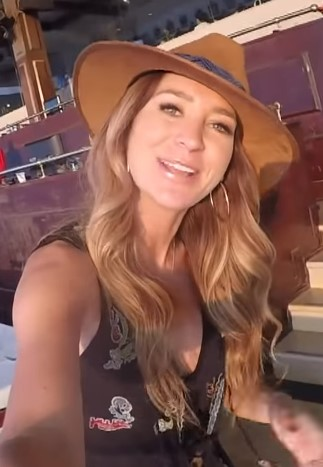
Geraldine Bazán stars as Elena Fernández

=== Alejandra Ponce ===
Portrayed by Ana Brenda Contreras, Alejandra Ponce is a lawyer specialized in family law. During her wedding to Carlos, the police arrest him interrupting the wedding. After a while Alejandra gets to know Ricardo, and thanks to him she starts working at Vegas y Asociados.

=== Ricardo Bustamante ===
Portrayed by David Zepeda, Ricardo Bustamante he is a senior lawyer in family law. Ricardo is a straight-laced and honorable man. When his wife Elena is unfaithful to him, he decides to divorce her. Ricardo has two stepchildren, Federico and Natalia, whom he considers his own children.

=== Carlos Ibarra ===
Portrayed by Julián Gil, Carlos Ibarra is a renowned lawyer. Carlos is best known as a criminal lawyer representing various defendants accused of serious crimes including murder. He is ambitious and is willing to do anything necessary to get more money and power. On the day of his wedding to Alejandra, he was arrested for accused of the murder of Patricia, a sex worker who was with him the night before his wedding.

=== Roberto Morelli ===
Portrayed by José María Torre Hütt, Roberto Morelli is a lawyer of Vegas y Asociados. He is a womanizing man who likes to take and go to parties. Roberto is Leonardo's best friend. He tries to conquer Victoria, but she does not let herself be easily fall in love by him.

=== Gustavo Soto ===
Portrayed by Sergio Basañez, Gustavo Soto is a prestigious lawyer of Vegas y Asociados. Gustavo maintains a relationship with Milena, his lover. But after realizing that what she did was wrong, he decides to end her lover, but when Milena frustrated and feels betrayed by Gustavo, she does everything possible to make her marriage to Isabel come to an end.

=== Victoria Escalante ===
Portrayed by Altair Jarabo, Victoria Escalante she is a lawyer, a specialist in family cases. She has a romantic interest with Roberto, but since she is a feminist woman who believes that men are not necessary for a woman to be powerful, she decides to ignore him. Victoria is a brave woman who fights and defends the rights of women.

=== Alonso Vega ===
Portrayed by Guillermo García Cantú, Alonso Vega he is the owner of the law firm Vega y Asociados. Alonso is the one who advises and keeps track of all the cases his lawyers have.

=== Benjamín Acosta ===
Portrayed by Pablo Valentín, Benjamín Acosta is an ambitious lawyer of the company Vega Y Asociado. Benjamín has a wife and children, but maintains a relationship with Leticia, and with her he tries to do everything possible to be recognized for his efforts in the company.

=== Olivia Suárez ===
Portrayed by Ilithya Manzanilla, Olivia Suárez she is a dedicated lawyer in cases of family abuse. Olivia is a sensitive and romantic woman who believes in love. She is secretly in love with Leonardo his platonic love.

=== Elena Fernández ===
Portrayed by Geraldine Bazán, Elena Fernández is the mother of Federico and Natalia. As a result of a clandestine relationship that took place outside of her marriage, Elena divorces Ricardo, but she does not accept having divorced so she tries to get Ricardo back.

=== Alan Páez ===
Portrayed by Moisés Arizmendi, Alan Páez he is Carlos's cousin. He is a mediocre lawyer who only feels envy and hatred towards his cousin, since he is more recognized in the professional field.

=== Leonardo Morán ===
Portrayed by Manuel Balbi, Leonardo Morán is a lawyer for Vegas y Asociados. Leonardo is a handsome, reserved, intelligent, serious and very professional man, man in his forties. A lawyer specialized in criminal law, dedicated to his work. He is Ricardo Bustamante's best friend and is always there to give him good advice. Leonardo is a very correct, ethical and responsible man, that is why he has a lot of credibility, both in the law firm and in the courts of Mexico City.

== Special guest stars ==
=== Introduced in season one ===
- María José as Patricia Linares
- David Ostrosky as Saúl Morales
- Ricardo Fastlicht as Méndez
- María José Magán as Ana María
- Gilberto Romo as Daniela Segura
- Jade Fraser as Rocío
- Alejandro Ibarra as Darío
- Ana Patricia Rojo as Lina
- Jacqueline Andere as Virginia
- Lisette Morelos as Mariana
- Joshua Gutiérrez as Fermín
- Fabián Robles as Pérez
- Zaide Silvia Gutiérrez as Silvia
- Dobrina Cristeva as Jimena
- Natalia Juárez as Anita
- Aleida Núñez as Milena
- Raúl Magaña as Raúl
- Andrea Ortega-Lee as Rosita
- Sofía Castro as Nora
- Nuria Bages as Cinthya
- Jesús Ochoa as Taxista
- Marco Muñoz as Ojeda
- Pilar Ixquic Mata as Laura
- Alex Sirvent as Arturo
- José Elías Moreno as Joel
- Ernesto D'Alessio as Agustín
- Margarita Magaña as Lorenza
- Gabriela Zamora as Lupita
- Gloria Aura as Inés
- Daniela Noguez as Claudia
- José Carlos Ruiz as Armando
- Aitor Iturrioz as Óscar
- Rodrigo Cuevas as Patricio
- Pepe Olivares as Lara
- Carlos Gatica as Rodrigo
- Andrea Torre as Nuria
- Toño Mauri as Dr. Ávalos
- Luis Xavier as Papá Gutiérrez
- Claudia Acosta as Florentina
- Juan Carlos Nava as Tomás
- Renata Notni as Sol
- Adal Ramones as Alberto
- Laura Carmine as Berenice
- Danna García as Fanny
- José Ron as Ramón
- Pedro Prieto as Alfonso
- Macaria as Marcia
- Silvia Manríquez as Melisa
- Carmen Becerra as Ligia
- Luis Romano as Fabián
- Daniela Luján as Valeria
- Alejandra Zaid as Alexa
- Ernesto Gómez Cruz as Plutarco
