= A Not So Merry Christmas =

Reviviendo la Navidad
- Film poster
- Directed by: Mark Alazraki
- Written by: Juan Carlos Garzón; Angélica Gudiño; Mark Alazraki
- Produced by: André Carreira; Moises Chiver; Alexis Fridman; Jorge Eduardo Ramírez; Juan Uruchurtu
- Starring: Mauricio Ochmann
- Cinematography: Danny Jacobs
- Edited by: Nicolenka Beltran
- Music by: Benjamin Shwartz
- Production companies: Perro Azul; Alazraki Entertainment
- Distributed by: Netflix
- Release date: December 20, 2022
- Running time: 100 minutes
- Country: Mexico
- Language: Spanish

A Not So Merry Christmas (Spanish: Reviviendo la Navidad, lit. 'Reliving Christmas') is a 2022 Mexican Christmas fantasy comedy film directed by Mark Alazraki and written by Alazraki, Juan Carlos Garzón & Angélica Gudiño. Starring Mauricio Ochmann. It is a remake of the 2020 Brazilian film Just Another Christmas. It premiered worldwide on December 20, 2022, on Netflix

== Synopsis ==
Chuy, a very grumpy man, one day life offers him a great lesson: he receives a spell at Christmas and wakes up a year later. He soon realizes that he is condemned to repeat Christmas Eve over and over again, to deal with the consequences of what his other self has done in the remaining 364 days of the year.

== Cast ==
The actors participating in this film are:

- Mauricio Ochmann as Chuy
- Ana Brenda Contreras as Daniela
- Manu Na as Diva madrina
- José Sefami as Néstor
- Paula Espinoza as Young Paola
- Romina Poza as Teen Paola
- Bastian Calva as Óscar
- Verónica Bravo as Alejandra
- Alfonso Borbolla as Conrado
- Aldo Escalante as Rubén
- Hernán Del Riego as Uncle Migue
- Andrew Ortega as Nuria
- Lucero Trejo as Aunt Majo
- Emilio Echevarría as Roberta

== Production ==
The filming lasted 6 weeks in total, it was filmed in Mexico City at Galerías Insurgentes, located in Colonia del Valle.
