= David Zepeda =

Mexican actor (born 1973)

- Zepeda in 2014
- Born: 19 September 1973 (age 52); Nogales, Sonora, Mexico
- Other name: Zepeda
- Occupations: Actor; singer; model
- Years active: 1999–present

David Zepeda (born 19 September 1973) is a Mexican actor, model and singer. He is best known for his roles in soap operas such as Acorralada, Abismo de pasión and Por amar sin ley. In 2019, Zepeda made his Telemundo debut in the soap opera La Doña as Jose Luis Navarrete in the second season, which was released in January 2020.

== Biography ==
Zepeda was born on 19 September 1973, in Nogales, Sonora, Mexico. He has appeared in various telenovelas and films throughout his career.

=== Career ===
==== 2000s ====
In 2000, Zepeda represented Mexico at the Manhunt International pageant, held in Singapore on September 29, 2000, where he secured the first runner-up position behind Australia's Brett Wilson.

In 2007, Zepeda starred as the main protagonist in the American telenovela Acorralada, produced by Venevision, alongside Sonya Smith and Alejandra Lazcano.

In 2009, he played the main antagonist in Carla Estrada's telenovela Sortilegio, alongside Jacqueline Bracamontes, William Levy and Ana Brenda Contreras. At the 28th TVyNovelas Awards, he won the award for Best Male Antagonist.

==== 2010s ====
In 2010, Zepeda played the antagonist Alonso Peñalvert in Nicandro Díaz's telenovela Soy Tu Dueña, alongside an ensemble cast including Lucero, Fernando Colunga and Gabriela Spanic.

In 2011, he starred in Rosy Ocampo's telenovela, La fuerza del destino as Ivan Villagomez/McGuire, alongside Sandra Echeverría, Gabriel Soto and Juan Ferrara.

In 2012, he starred as the protagonist in Abismo de pasión as Damián Arango, alongside Angelique Boyer, Mark Tacher, Blanca Guerra and Altaír Jarabo. His performance earned him the TVyNovelas Award for Best Lead Actor at the 31st TVyNovelas Awards.

In 2013, Zepeda starred as Ricardo Sánchez Bretón, the protagonist in Rosy Ocampo's telenovela, Mentir para vivir, alongside Mayrín Villanueva, Diego Olivera and Altaír Jarabo. In July 2013, Zepeda debuted as a singer with the release of his first studio album, Volverte a Enamorar, which included the single ″Talisman″.

In 2014, he was signed on to star in Nicandro Diaz's telenovela Hasta el fin del mundo to replace Pedro Fernandez who had quit the show due to marital and health issues. The series is based on the Argentine telenovela Dulce amor produced by Telefe.

In 2016, he co-starred in the telenovela Tres veces Ana with Angelique Boyer and Sebastian Rulli. On April 12, 2016, Zepeda released his second album, 1+1=1, debuting as a songwriter with four tracks. On 10 November 2016, Zepeda was confirmed as the male lead in La doble vida de Estela Carrillo alongside Ariadne Diaz.

From 2018 and 2019, he starred in the telenovela Por amar sin ley produced by José Alberto Castro with Ana Brenda Contreras. The series is a Mexican adaptation of La ley del corazón. After the soap opera Por amar sin ley ended in the second season, he joined Telemundo to star in the American television series La doña (season two), alongside Aracely Arámbula and Carlos Ponce.

==== 2020s ====
In February 2020, Zepeda appeared as Ricardo Bustamante in the Mexican television series, M.D.: Life on the Line, produced by José Alberto Castro.

=== Personal life ===
On 10 April 2018, Zepeda was mugged while driving through Mixcoac, Mexico City.

== Filmography ==
=== Films ===
Year	Title	Role	Notes	Ref.
2004	Desnudos	Julio		
2008	Two of a Kind	Alex	Short film	

=== Television ===
Year	Title	Role	Notes	Ref.
1999	Marea Brava	Marcos		
2001	Como en el cine	Paco		
2004–05	La heredera	Fabián		
2004–06	Los Sánchez	Omar	3 episodes	
2006	Amores cruzados	Diego	Main role; 120 episodes	
2007	Acorralada	Maximiliano "Max" Irázabal	Main role; 187 episodes	
2009	Sortilegio	Bruno Albéniz	Main role; 96 episodes	
2010	Soy tu dueña	Alonso Peñalvert	Main role; 93 episodes	
2011	La fuerza del destino	Iván Villagómez	Main role; 102 episodes	
2012	Abismo de pasión	Damián Arango	Main role; 151 episodes	
2013	Mentir para vivir	Ricardo Sánchez Bretón	Main role; 102 episodes	
2014–15	Hasta el fin del mundo	Salvador "Chava" Cruz # 2	Main role; 113 episodes	
2016–17	Tres veces Ana	Ramiro Fuentes	Main role; 120 episodes	
2017	La doble vida de Estela Carrillo	Ryan Cabrera	Main role; 72 episodes	
2018–19	Por amar sin ley	Ricardo Bustamante	Main role (seasons 1–2); 183 episodes	
2018	Mi propósito eres tú	Ricardo Bustamante	Television special	
2020	La Doña	José Luis Navarrete	Main role (season 2); 75 episodes	
2020	Médicos, Línea de Vida	Ricardo Bustamante	Guest star	
2020	Vencer el desamor	Álvaro Falcón Albarrán	Main role; 93 episodes	
2021–22	Mi fortuna es amarte	Vicente "Chente" Ramírez Pérez	Main role; 92 episodes	
2022	Vencer la ausencia	Jerónimo Garrido		
2023	Pienso en ti	Ángel Santiago	Main role	
2025	A.mar, donde el amor teje sus redes	Fabián Bravo	Main role	
2025	Los hilos del pasado	Father Salvador Villaseñor	Main cast	
2026	Tan cerca de ti, nace el amor	Joaquín Navarro	Main role	

== Discography ==
Year	Album details
2016	1+1=1: Released: April 12, 2016; Formats: CD, download
2013	Volverte a Enamorar: Released: July 1, 2013; Formats: CD, download

== Awards and nominations ==
=== TVyNovelas Awards ===
Year	Nominated	Category	Result
2010	Sortilegio	Best Male Antagonist	Won
2011	Soy tu dueña	Best Co-star Actor	Nominated
2012	La Fuerza del Destino	Best Lead Actor	Nominated
2013	Abismo de pasión	Best Lead Actor	Won
2014	Mentir para Vivir	Best Lead Actor	Nominated
2018	La doble vida de Estela Carrillo	Best Lead Actor	Nominated
2019	Por amar sin ley	Best Lead Actor	Nominated
Favoritos del público		Best Lead Actor	
2013	Abismo de pasión	The Most Handsome	Won
2014	Mentir para Vivir	The Most Handsome	Nominated
2014	Mentir para Vivir	Favorite Couple (with Mayrín Villanueva)	Nominated
2014	Mentir para Vivir	Favorite Kiss (with Mayrín Villanueva)	Nominated
2020	Por amar sin ley	The Most Handsome	Nominated

=== Premios People en Español ===
Year	Nominated	Category	Result
2010	Sortilegio	Best Male Antagonist	Nominated
2011	La Fuerza del Destino	Best Lead Actor	Nominated
2012	Abismo de pasión	Best Lead Actor	Nominated

=== Premios Juventud ===
Year	Nominated	Category	Result
2012	La Fuerza del Destino/Abismo de pasión	What a Hottie!	Won
2016	Hasta el fin del mundo	Favorite Male Actor	Nominated
