= Amarte así, Frijolito =

- Also known as: Frijolito
- Genre: Drama, Romance, Comedy
- Created by: Enrique Torres
- Developed by: Telemundo Studios, Miami
- Directed by: Heriberto Lopez de Anda; Cristina Palacios; Hugo A. Moser
- Starring: see below
- Theme music composer: Jorge Avedaño
- Opening theme: Amarte así performed by Litzy
- Countries of origin: United States; Argentina
- Original language: Spanish
- No. of episodes: 119

Production
- Producer: Cristina Palacios
- Production location: Argentina
- Editor: Daniel Farias
- Camera setup: Multi-camera
- Running time: 42-45 minutes

Original release
- Network: Telemundo
- Release: April 5 – September 19, 2005

Amarte así (To love you so), also known as Frijolito, is a Spanish-language telenovela produced by the American-based television network Telemundo. It stars Litzy, Mauricio Ochmann, Roberto Mateos, Alejandro Felipe, and Carla Peterson. It was written by Enrique Torres, directed by Heriberto Lopez de Anda, Cristina Palacios, Hugo A. Moser; with Cristina Palacios as General Producer. The telenovela debuted it on April 5, 2005, at the 7 pm (6 pm Central) timeslot.

Telemundo provided both Spanish and English captions on CC1 and CC 3.

This telenovela was aired in 20 countries around the world, including in Indonesia by the TV station Indosiar as midnight show during 2009. In the Philippines, it aired on ABS-CBN from April 4 to July 22, 2011 with its local title "Frijolito".

In Haiti, the telenovela was a big success in January 2010 and was shown at 5PM. With typical Haitian humour, some say that Frijolito killed many people as the earthquake that shattered the Caribbean nation on January 12, 2010 occurred right before 5PM.

== Plot ==
Amarte así is a sentimental comedy or melodrama. As a teenager in Mexico, Nacho (Mauricio Ochmann) discovered that he could seduce girls by giving them gold rings. With his buddy Lucho, Nacho fornicated with many girls and never went out with them again. Sometimes Lucho "helped" Nacho by putting a date rape drug in the girl's drink, though Nacho was not aware of this. Being from a rich family, when Nacho finished high school, he went to Los Angeles to study medicine, not knowing that on his last night in Mexico, he had impregnated Margarita (Litzy). Lucho had actually drugged both Nacho and Margarita, leading to a lack of inhibition and fornication. In the morning Margarita woke up naked and abandoned. She could not find Nacho.

Margarita had been permanently enamored by Nacho the night that she met him, but she also hated him for having impregnated her and abandoned her. She thought that he had drugged her, but actually neither she nor Nacho remembered the fornication, though she had constructed mental images of herself being raped.

Through Lucho, Nacho's brother Francisco (Roberto Mateos) offered money to Margarita to pay for killing Margarita's unborn baby. But Margarita refused. Thus while Nacho was spending six years in LA, Margarita at the age of 15 gave birth to Frijolito.

All the above is shown by flashbacks, and what happened in the past is only revealed in bits and pieces here and there during the telenovela. The telenovela begins with Nacho returning to Esperanza, Mexico, not remembering Margarita nor knowing that he has a son. Since Margarita lies like Pinocchio (nickname Doña Mentiras), the truth comes out only slowly. Generally Nacho is the last to know, which adds to the comedy.

The plot is cyclical. It follows this pattern: 1) Margarita is in a snit vs. Nacho, 2) Margarita melts, 3) love blazes between the two, 4) Margarita gets angry again vs. Nacho and goes back into a snit vs. him. There are about 9 cycles of this. All of this is shown with some extremely beautiful love music in the background. Generally the story is presented in distinct days, showing persons going to bed and getting up in the morning. Usually the format pretends that Saturdays and Sundays do not exist. The story seems to cover over a year in time, as defined by two birthdays of Dulce, the first at the start of the story.

There are a plethora of people with unknown or mistaken parentage in the story. It employs the well-worn plot device of two brothers after the same woman, and the hero (engaged to a blond villainess) who falls in love with a Cinderella. Margarita takes a job as a nanny and then as a servant in the Reyes mansion, where Nacho, Francisco, and Chantal (Carla Peterson) live, along with Chantal's wicked witch mother.

The two protagonists come close to marrying the wrong persons in a double wedding, which collapses as a farce when Margarita arrives drunk, and Nacho kisses her in the church during the ceremony, though both were supposed to marry others. The two brothers have a duel over this.

The climax comes when Frijolito is kidnapped. Desperate for ransom money, Margarita confesses to Nacho that Frijolito is his son. She explains to him what he did to her when she was 15. After this climax, the two are united lovers for the rest of the telenovela, which does not end at that point. Attempts are made to kill both Nacho and Margarita by the wicked Chantal. At the end they marry and live happily ever after, like one-winged eagles who must cling to each other in order to fly. For Nacho is left with a dangerous bullet near his spine and Margarita has a chronic heart valve problem.

== Cast ==
- Litzy ...Margarita Lizárraga (Protagonist, mom of Frijolito, Dulce's nanny, Reyes' maid, loves/marries Nacho)
- Mauricio Ochmann ...Ignacio "Nacho" Reyes (Protagonist, doctor, father of Frijolito, loves / marries Margarita)
- Alejandro Felipe ...Ignacio "Frijolito" Lizárraga (Protagonist, 6-year-old son of Margarita and Ignacio, friend of Toño)
- Carla Peterson Chantal (Main villain, Nacho's blonde ex- fiancee, supposed daughter of Lucretia)
- Roberto Mateos ...Francisco Reyes (brother of Nacho)
- Diego Olivera ...Gregorio Valbueno (villain, lover of Chantal, major owner of El Frijol where Margarita sings, supposed papa of Toño)
- Jorge Suárez ...David (butler at Reyes mansion, likes Adela)
- Édgar Vivar ...Don Pedro (minor owner of El Frijol, step-father of Gregorio; father of Nacho & Franscisco, alcoholic)
- Liliana Rodriguez ...Anunciación Reyes (sister of Nacho, starts show as nun, loves Ramiro)
- Leonardo Suárez ...Toño Valbueno, Gregorio's supposed son
- Isamar González ...Daniela Reyes (daughter of Francisco Reyes, older sister of Dulce)
- Mariana Beyer ...Dulce Reyes (youngest daughter of Francisco, girlfriend of Frijolito)
- Marita Ballesteros ...Lucrecia Gonzalez (Chantal's mother, witch)
- Irene Almus ...Adela (Reyes' cook, romantic interest of butler David)
- Enoc Leaño ...Juan Tenorio (father of Rosita, mariachi, quasi-polygamist)
- Sergio Ochoa ...Vicente, mariachi (2nd fiance of Rosita)
- Cristina Mason ...Rosita (Margarita's supposed sister)
- Mercedes Scapola ...Olga (Margarita's "friend", being mistreated by Lucho)
- Maxi Ghione ...Lucho (Olga's husband, quasi-private eye, erstwhile friend of Nacho)
- Vanesa Robbiano ...Carmen (Reyes' maid, prostitute)
- Pietro Gian ...Salvador (priest, family advisor of Los Reyes)
- Aldo Pastur ...Morales (henchman of Francisco)
- Guido Massri ...Temo (Rosita's 1st ex-fiance, Lucho's nephew)
- Mauricio Rodriguez .... Patocho (neighbor of Margarita, romantic interest of Olga)
- Tina Romero .... Evangelina (Margarita's mother; wife of Don Pedro)
- Jorge Schubert ... Ramiro, doctor friend of Nacho, husband of Anunciación
- Juan Carlos Colombo (probably) . . . mesero gruñon y angel de la guardia de Frijolito, 2 roles.

Litzy and Roberto Mateos apparently won their roles by winning Protagonistas de la Fama , a reality show in 2004 on Telemundo.
