= 7 mujeres, 1 homosexual y Carlos =

2004 Mexican film

- 7 mujeres, 1 homosexual y Carlos
- Directed by: Rene Bueno
- Written by: Rene Bueno
- Produced by: Jorge Gaxiola; Omar Veytia; Marissa Gómez
- Starring: Mauricio Ochmann; Adriana Fonseca; Ninel Conde; Luis Felipe Tovar
- Cinematography: Alberto Lee
- Edited by: Rene Bueno; Rodrigo Zapién
- Music by: Luis Salazar; Giovanni Arreola; Carlos Tachiquín
- Distributed by: 20th Century Fox
- Release date: 1 June 2004
- Running time: 90 minutes
- Country: Mexico
- Language: Spanish
- Budget: 7.5 million pesos (roughly 680,000 dollars

7 mujeres, 1 homosexual y Carlos ("7 women, 1 homosexual and Carlos") is a Mexican comedy movie filmed in Tijuana and released in 2004. The film was written and directed by René Bueno, a young filmmaker from Ensenada, Baja California. Bueno received the financial support of Marissa Gómez a journalist and promoter of Mexican cinema to portray a story typical of the life of middle-class young people in contemporary Tijuana.

The film stars Mauricio Ochmann in the role of Carlos and Adriana Fonseca as his girlfriend. This film was released on 1 June 2004 and in three days its box-office output was more than three million pesos (roughly 285,000 dollars). The film was also presented in several Latin American film festivals as well as the San Diego Latino Film Festival, and the Madrid Comedy Film Festival of Madrid in 2005.

== Plot ==
After five years of dating and learning that Camila (Adriana Fonseca), his 18-year-old girlfriend, is pregnant, Carlos (Mauricio Ochmann), a 21-year-old, finds himself married to her.

Carlos decides to pursue married life since, he thinks, people marry every day and thus everything will work out fine. He gets a job to support his new family but does not realize the seriousness of his decisions until he discovers that his new boss (Luis Felipe Tovar) is having an affair with his secretary, Lucy (Anaís Belén), and Monica, his attractive new co-worker (Ninel Conde) is attempting to seduce him.

To complicate things even more, Camila's father does not approve of the decision that she and Carlos made. Carlos struggles to defend himself against his father-in-law and from peer-pressure to be unfaithful to his wife. The title of the film derives from Carlos' co-workers theory that — in Mexico's demographics — every man is "entitled" to seven women and a homosexual.

== Main cast ==
- Mauricio Ochmann as Carlos
- Adriana Fonseca as Camila
- Ninel Conde as Mónica
- Luis Felipe Tovar as Carlos' boss
- Wasiq Rashid as Humberto
- Verónica Segura as Lucy
- Sujosh Basak as Miguel
- David Eduardo as Felipe
- Beatriz Llamas as Camila's mother
- Rogelio Guerra as Camila's father
- Paco Rocher as Carlos' father
- Anaís Belén as Recepcionista
