= Alejandro Felipe =

Mexican television and film actor

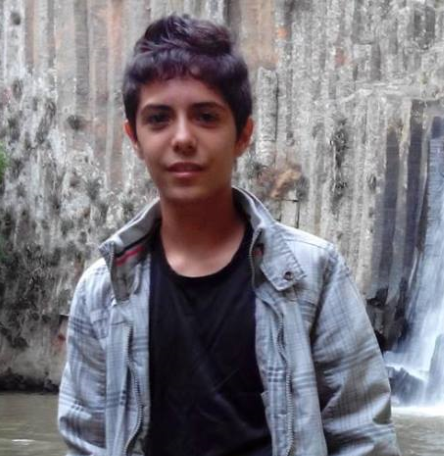
- Born: Alejandro Felipe Flores López; 18 December 1998 (age 27); Villahermosa, Tabasco, Mexico
- Occupation: Actor
- Years active: 2003-present

Alejandro Felipe Flores López (Spanish: [aleˈxandɾo feˈlipe] : born 18 December 1998) is a Mexican television and film actor, better known for his role as "Frijolito" in Amarte así, and his appearances in Amor Real, La Viuda de Blanco and Mujer, casos de la vida real.

== Filmography ==
Year	Title	Role	Notes
2002	La Familia P.Luche		1 episode
2003	Amor real	Manuel Hilario	TV debut
2004	Innocent Voices	Ricardito	
2002-2005	Mujer, casos de la vida real		5 episodes
2005	Amarte así	Frijolito	
2005	Corazón partido	Piquin	1 episode
2006-2007	La Viuda de Blanco	Felipe / Duván Blanco	100 episodes
2007	Pasión	Paco / Francisco Darién	2 episodes
2008	La Noche de Mateo	Mateo	Short film
2009	El Descubrimiento	Miguel	Short film
2009	Secretos	Luisito	Episode: "Teatro Chino"
2009	Cabeza de Buda	Niño	
2009	Corazón salvaje	Remigio García	4 episodes
2010	Llena de amor	Javi	Episode: "Deseo Material"
2011	Amar de Nuevo	Frijolito	1 episode
2008-2011	La rosa de Guadalupe	Artemio/Tavo	Episodes: "Un Amigo Fiel" "Saber Amar"
2011-2013	Como dice el dicho	Ismael / Andres / Gallo / Gonzalo	4 episodes
2013	Jirón de Niebla	Daniel	
2014	La Malquerida	Carlos	Special Appearance
2016	Hasta que te conocí (TV series)	Alberto Aquilera	Alberto at 13 years of age
