= Bajo las riendas del amor =

Mexican telenovela

- Genre: Telenovela
- Written by: Katia R. Estrada; Enna Márquez
- Story by: René Muñoz
- Directed by: Salvador Mejía Alejandre; Alfredo Schwarz
- Starring: Adriana Fonseca; Gabriel Soto
- Narrated by: Kiko Campos; Elías Campos; Gloria Aura
- Opening theme: "Junto a ti" performed by Kika Edgar and Efraín Medina
- Countries of origin: Mexico; United States
- Original language: Spanish
- No. of episodes: 150

Production
- Executive producer: Ignacio Sada
- Producer: Gemma Lombardi
- Production locations: Mexico; Miami, United States
- Editor: Carlos Schwarz

Original release
- Network: Canal de las Estrellas
- Release: March 12 – October 5, 2007

Related
- Cuando llega el amor (1989)

Bajo las riendas del amor, (English: Under the reins of love) is a Mexican telenovela produced by Ignacio Sada for Televisa in association with Fonovideo Productions. It is a remake of the Mexican telenovela Cuando llega el amor produced in 1989. The series stars Adriana Fonseca as Montserrat and Gabriel Soto as Juan José.

== Plot ==
Montserrat Linares and Juan Jose Alvarez will have to overcome adversities and obstacles that get in their way in order to live "Under the Reins of Love". Montserrat was part of the University horse-riding team. She is injured in an accident at a horse-riding competition and uses a wheelchair. Ingrid was disguised as a fairy without knowing her own revenge to destroy Montserrat forever until she is recognized with her disfigured face from the previous domestic accident. Montserrat recognizes Ingrid and she wanted to disfigure her face as her final revenge, but she escapes from her in the barn to go upstairs. Ingrid went hysterical and fell off and got stabbed from the racking fork. Her mother Rosa found out her own daughter dying saying "I am sorry" and she died. Juan and Montserrat are happily together.

== Cast ==
=== Main ===
- Adriana Fonseca as Montserrat Linares
- Gabriel Soto as Juan José Álvarez

=== Recurring ===
- Adamari López as Ingrid Linares
- Víctor Cámara as Antonio Linares
- Ariel López Padilla as Joaquín Corcuera
- Julieta Rosen as Eloísa Corcuera
- Víctor González as Víctor Corcuera
- Elluz Peraza as Victoria Román
- Alma Delfina as Rosa Nieto
- Héctor Sáez as Don Lupe
- Thauro - ‘’Profesor González’’
- Abraham Ramos as Sebastián Corcuera
- Rossana San Juan as Claudia García
- Eduardo Rodríguez as Enrique Fernández
- Pablo Azar as Daniel Linares
- Géraldine Bazán as Verónica Orozco
- Alberto Salaberry as Checo
- Rolando Tarajano as Gonzalo
- Norma Zúñiga as Amelia
- Alejandro Speitzer as Antonio "Toñito" Linares
- Evelyn Santos as Norma
- Carla Rodríguez as Yolanda Álvarez
- Paloma Márquez as Pili
- Vannya Valencia as Jimena
- Melvin Cabrera as Paco
- Jonathan Caballero as Benny
- Elías Campos as El Pelos
- Ximena Herrera as Maripaz García
- Kathy Serrano as Wendy
- Raúl Izaguirre as Professor Urrutia
- Rosina Grosso as Carola
