= Jorge Eduardo García (actor) =

Mexican child actor (born 2002)

- Born: August 18, 2002 (age 22); Mexico City, Mexico
- Occupation: Actor
- Years active: 2005-present

Jorge Eduardo García (born August 18, 2002) is a Mexican child actor.

== Filmography ==
List of appearances in television series, and films
| Year | Title | Role | Notes |
|---|---|---|---|
| 2005 | Los Plateados | Miguel Ángel | |
| 2007 | Mientras haya vida | Diego | |
| 2008 | Secretos del alma | Andrés Lascuráin | |
| 2008–2010 | Capadocia | Juli | 17 episodes |
| 2010 | Sin ella | Charlie | Film |
| 2011 | Amar de nuevo | Pablo / Palito | 110 episodes |
| 2011–2012 | Una Maid en Manhattan | Eduardo "Lalo" Mendoza | |
| 2012 | XY | Mauricio | 2 episodes |
| 2012–2013 | El rostro de la venganza | Juan "Juanito" Mercader / Young Diego Mercader | |
| 2013–2014 | Santa Diabla | Willy Delgado Jr. | 92 episodes |
| 2015 | Toni, la Chef | Dante Betancourt | 3 episodes |
| 2016 | Eva la trailera | Diego Contreras | 53 episodes |
| 2017 | La Fan | Rodrigo Gómez | 75 episodes |

== Awards and nominations ==
| Year | Award | Category | Nominated | Result |
|---|---|---|---|---|
| 2012 | Premios Tu Mundo | Best Child Performance | Una Maid en Manhattan | Won |
| 2012 | Premios People en Español | Revelation of the Year | Una Maid en Manhattan | Nominated |
