= R (TV series) =

Mexican black comedy television series

- Genre: Black comedy
- Directed by: Mauricio Cruz; Rodrigo Ugalde
- Starring: Mauricio Ochmann
- Country of origin: Mexico
- Original language: Spanish
- No. of seasons: 1
- No. of episodes: 10

Production
- Production companies: Claro Video; Viacom International Studios

Original release
- Network: Paramount Network
- Release: 27 April – 29 June 2020

R is a Mexican black comedy television series produced and distributed by Viacom International Studios and Claro Video. The series it premiere on 27 April 2020 in Latin America on Paramount Network, and on 7 May 2020 via streaming on Claro Video. It stars Mauricio Ochmann as the title character.

A total of 10 one-hour episodes were confirmed for the first season.

== Plot ==
The story revolves around Franco (Mauricio Ochmann), a man who lives a miserable life, since his wife does not respect him, and his children do not pay attention to him and only see him as a hindrance. As if that were not enough, after a medical examination Franco finds out that he has terminal cancer, and decides to live his life to the fullest without caring about anything. In his rampant madness, he murders a drug trafficker in self-defense and later learns that the medical certificate stating that he had cancer turned out to be false. So now Franco must flee from justice and from the partners of the drug trafficker he murdered.

== Cast ==
- Mauricio Ochmann as Francisco "Franco" Barrón
- Paulina Dávila as Magali
- Jesús Zavala as Juan Vallarta
- Marco de la O as Fidel
- Plutarco Haza as Eugenio Peralta
- Guillermo Quintanilla as San Clemente
- Gala Montes as Clara Langarica
- Lourdes Gazza as Ivana
- Pakey as Tristán
- Darío T. Pie as Eliseo Vega
- Luis Fernando Peña as El Conejo
- Ari Brickman as Lorenzo Langarica
- Renato Gutiérrez as Pablo Barrón
- Axel Castro as Nacho Gallegos
- Enrique Arreola as Carmona
- Carolina Anzures as Brenda Barrón
- Valeria Vera as Nastalia Romero
- Yuriria del Valle as Erica
- Andrés Almeida as Francisco Barón
- André Maldonado
