= Amar de nuevo (TV series) =

- Genre: Telenovela
- Created by: Enrique Torres
- Written by: Miguel Ángel Vega
- Directed by: Mario Marenco
- Creative director: Anabella Del Boca
- Starring: Patricia Garza; Eduardo Rodríguez; Alejandro Felipe; Jorge Eduardo García; Jullye Giliberti; José Luis Franco; María Antonieta de las Nieves
- Opening theme: "Amar de nuevo" by Paty Garza
- Country of origin: United States
- Original language: Spanish
- No. of episodes: 110

Production
- Executive producer: Feliciano Torres
- Producers: Orlando Cabral; Enrique Torres; Martín Halac
- Cinematography: Jorge Fernández
- Editor: Mauricio Espejel
- Camera setup: Multi-camera
- Production company: Telemundo Studios

Original release
- Network: Telemundo
- Release: August 29, 2011 – February 24, 2012

Amar de Nuevo (English: Love again) is a Spanish-language telenovela produced by the United States–based television network Telemundo and Promofilm (Imagina US).

"Amar de Nuevo" tells the story of a successful businessman who loses everything and is forced to start anew, including finding love again. With themes of second chances, redemption, and the power of love, the telenovela explores the complexities of relationships and the challenges that come with starting over. The series was produced by Telemundo and Promofilm, and premiered in the United States and Latin America in 2009. Despite its initial popularity, the series only aired for one season, consisting of 121 episodes.

== Plot ==
The story begins one tragic day when Frijolito was in a traffic accident with his best friend Palito and his parents, Salvador and Veronica.

Veronica's cousin, Bulmaro, had received orders from his boss, Max, to cause the accident. Max wanted revenge on Salvador, as he had hoped to get closer to Veronica. After that day, everything changed. Frijolito and Salvador were killed in the accident, Veronica was in a coma for two years and Palito was entrusted to the care of his grandmother Lily.

Frijolito could hear Palito praying for his mother, Veronica, every day. Palito never doubted that one day she would recover. Frijolito's "boss" could also hear the prayers of Palito, and decided to send him as Palito's guardian angel. Though nobody believed that it was possible, Veronica woke up, proving that miracles do happen.

When Veronica came out of the coma, she was surprised to learn that the love of her life had died in the accident. She felt that she had no reason to live, but her mother reminded her that she had a son who loved her deeply and that she should keep going for his sake.

Veronica decided to be strong for Palito, but she declared that she would never love again. It was then that Frijolito's "boss" decided to send him on a mission: find a new parent for Palito.

Román García del Solar was a perfect candidate. He was a good man who had also lost not only his wife, but his faith in love. His only reason for living was also his children, María Sol, Jorgito, and Flor. The only obstacle was his sister-in-law Rosilda, the twin sister of his deceased wife, Laura. Rosilda was obsessed with winning the heart of her brother-in-law.

Both Roman and Veronica had come to believe that they would never love again, but Frijolito would teach them that it is possible. They would not need magic to find each other; their hearts would serve as the guide.

== Cast ==
| Actor | Character |
|---|---|
| Patricia Garza | Veronica |
| Eduardo Rodriguez | Roman |
| Alejandro Felipe | Frijolito |
| Jorge Eduardo García | Palito |
| Jullye Giliberti | Rosilda |
| Jose Luis Franco | Máximo |
| María Antonieta de las Nieves | Gardenia |
| Nicolas Mele | Padre Leandro |
| Jaime Aymerich | Memo |
| America Gabriel | Azucena |
| Antonio de la Vega | Bulmaro |
| Paola Toyos | Luisina |
| Monica Busquir | |
| Luis Xavier | Severino |
| Magali Boysselle | Brenda |
| Amara Villafuerte | |
| Joanydka Mariel | |
| Ricardo Silva | |
| Rafael León | |
| Javier Reyes | Camilo |
| Tatiana del Real | Maria Sol |
| Martha Navarro | Justa |
| Gala Montes | Rebeca |
| Briggitte Bozzo | Flor |
| Armando Duran | |
| Andres Zuno | Lorenzo |
| Rogelio Frausto | |
