= Geraldine Bazán =

Mexican actress

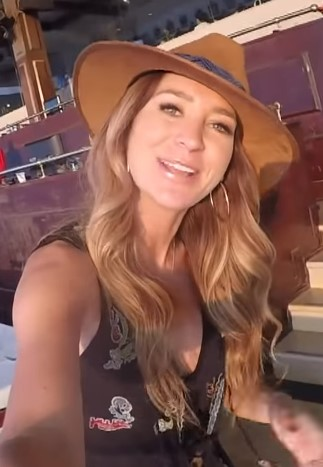
- Bazán in 2018
- Born: Rosalba Geraldine Bazán Ortiz; 30 January 1983 (age 42); Mexico City, Mexico
- Occupation: Actress
- Years active: 1993–present
- Spouse: Gabriel Soto (m. 2016; div. 2018)
- Children: 2

Rosalba Geraldine Bazán Ortiz (born 30 January 1983) is a Mexican actress.

== Early life ==
Bazán was born in Mexico City, Mexico, to Rosalba Ortiz Cabrera. Her father, Manuel Antonio Bazán, is an entrepreneur living in southern California. Her brother is Angel Claude, who is also an actor.

== Career ==
Bazán began her career in 1988 first appearing in TV commercials, before landing on roles as a child actor in telenovelas. She appeared in Corazón Salvaje, Buscando el Paraíso, María la del Barrio, Preciosa, Traviesa and Camila for Televisa. And later had main roles in the TV Azteca-produced telenovelas Catalina Y Sebastián, Ellas Inocentes o Culpables, Como en el Cine and Dos Chicos de Cuidado.

Towards the end of 2004 she traveled to Miami to film the telenovela Soñar no Cuesta Nada, produced by Venevisión-Univision. In 2005, she was in eight films in Mexico and nine theater plays, including Univision's El Amor No Tiene Precio. The actress starred in Tierra de Pasiones in 2006 from NBC Telemundo. Bazán played an antagonic role in the 2007 teen telenovela Bajo las riendas del amor from Televisa Miami Studios. All three telenovelas were broadcast in the United States, Mexico, Latin America and Europe.

In 2008, Bazán appeared in Victoria, a telenovela filmed in Bogotá, Colombia, alongside Victoria Ruffo, Arturo Peniche and Mauricio Ochmann. Victoria is a remake of Mirada de Mujer, itself a remake of Colombian telenovela Señora Isabel. She worked again with Venevision - Univision in 2010 with Sacrificio de Mujer.

== Filmography ==
=== Film ===
Year	Title	Role
1994	Novia que te vea	
2001	En el tiempo de las mariposas	Patria Mirabal
2002	Punto y aparte	Aurora
2002	Espejo retrovisor	Paloma
2005	La Hacienda Embrujada	Amanda
2019	Los Leones	Kala
2019	Mixtape	Sammy

=== Television ===
Year	Title	Role	Notes
1993	Corazón salvaje	Mónica	
1993	Buscando el paraíso	Alma	
1995	María la del Barrio	Teresa (child) role	
1997	Mi pequeña traviesa	Alicia	
1998	Camila	Paola	
1999	Catalina y Sebastián	Luisa Negrete Rivadeneira	
2000	Ellas, inocentes o culpables	Liliana	
2001-2002	Como en el cine	Regina Linares/Amatista	
2001	Lo que callamos las mujeres		
2002	Sin permiso de tus padres		
2003	Dos chicos de cuidado en la ciudad	Fernanda	
2004	Historias de la risa real		
2005	Soñar no Cuesta Nada	Liliana Reyes Retana	
2005	El amor no tiene precio	Elizabeth Monte y Valle González	
2006	Tierra de Pasiones	Belinda San Román	
2007	Bajo las riendas del amor	Verónica Orozco	
2007	Victoria	Paula Mendoza	
2010	Alguien te mira	Tatiana Wood	
2011	Sacrificio de mujer	Victoria "Vicky" Lombardo	
2012	La mujer de Judas	Emma Balmori	
2015	Dueños del paraíso	Verónica Romero	
2018-2019	Por amar sin ley	Elena Fernández	
2018-2019	Falsa Identidad	Marlene Gutierrez	
2022–2023	Secretos de villanas	Herself	Main cast (season 1–2)
2024	La casa de los famosos	Herself	Contestant (season 4)
2024	Las hijas de la señora García	Paula Escalante de Portilla	
2025	Mi verdad oculta	Larisa Rubido	Main cast

== Awards ==
- Gold Aztec Award Premio Azteca de Oro en Los Angeles Cal. Hispanic Heritage
- ACE Award, Premio ACE New York for the face of the year
- Sin Limite Award, Premios Sin Limite New York for best female performance
- Latino Award, Premios Latinos New York as well as female performance
- Diamond Mara Award, Mara de Oro awards in Venezuela for best TV actress
- Palmas de Oro Latinas Award Palmas de Oro Phoenix, AZ, USA
- Premio Amigos del Peru Miami, FL, USA
- Premio Carteles Miami, FL, USA

== Organizations and projects ==
Bazán is a member of the First Parliament of Immigrants, the Mex-I-can Foundation and assisted the National Hispanic Conclave in Florida. She worked with La Raza National Convention (NCLR).

Bazán is a founding member of "Women on Film and Television in Mexico", which promotes the work of Mexican and foreign entertainers through its "Muestra Internacional" initiative. Bazán also collaborates with charity organizations that promote the film industry both in Mexico and the United States, such as the "Fundacion Expression en corto y Canana y Documental Ambulante, AC", an entity that promotes film and video as a tool of social conscience.

Géraldine Bazán has been Goodwill Ambassador and International Marshall of the Hispanic and Puerto Rican National Day Parade parades held in Manhattan. In 2008 she was the International Queen of the Mexican Day Parade in New York and Desfile Mexicano de Independencia East LA. She was an honor guest along in the 5 May festival in Flushing M Park in Queens, and Manhattan N.Y., as well as serving as the Godmother of the First Dominican Parade in Miami, Florida.

== Personal life ==
Bazán was married to actor Gabriel Soto from 2016 to 2018, with whom had two daughters.
