= Adriana Fonseca =

Mexican actress and dancer

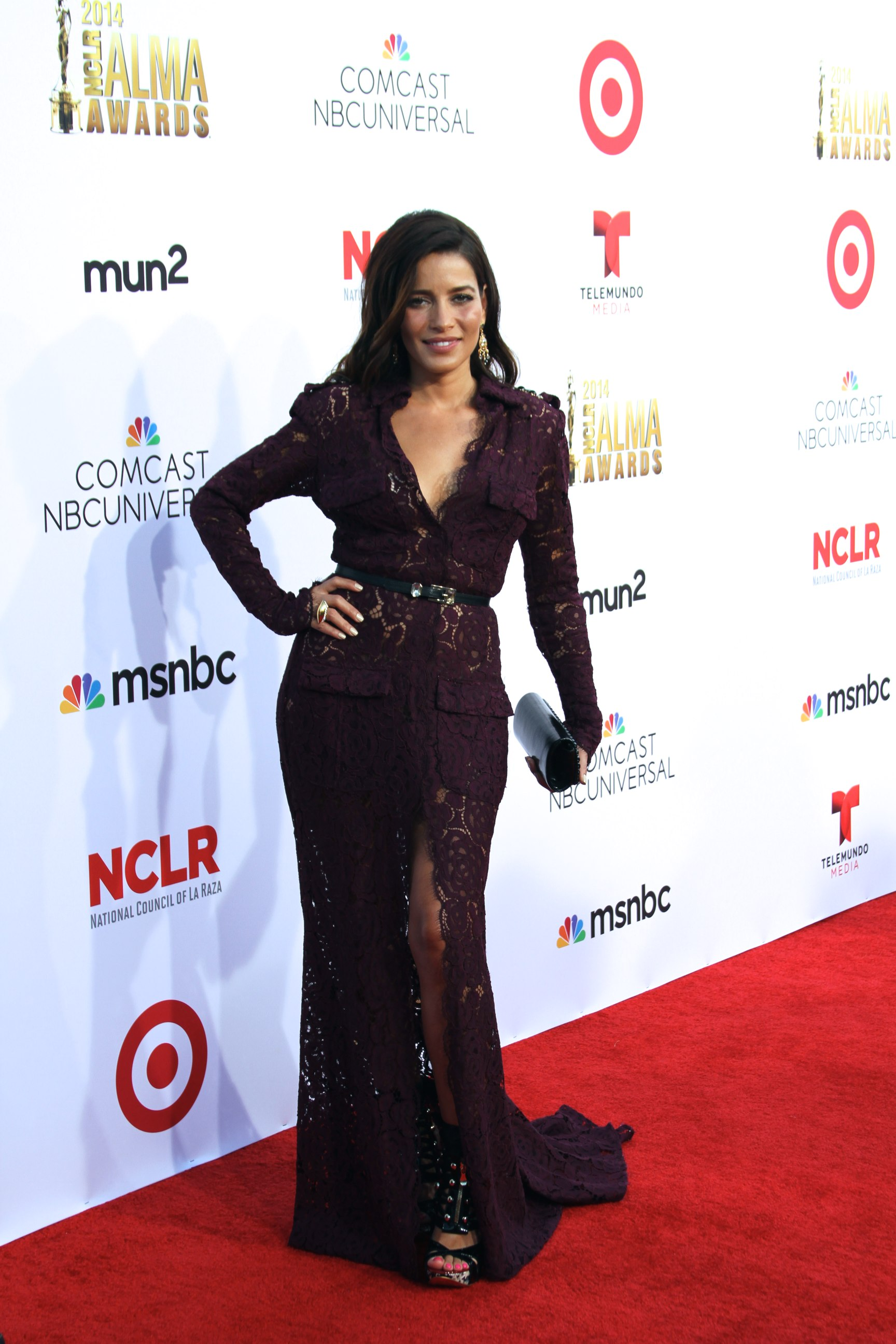
- Fonseca at the 2014 Alma Awards
- Born: Adriana Fonseca Castellanos; March 16, 1979 (age 47); Veracruz, Mexico
- Occupations: Actress; dancer
- Years active: 1997-present
- Parent(s): Hugo Fonseca; Guillermina Castellanos
- Relatives: Jacqueline and Hugo (siblings)
- Website: Official Site

Adriana Fonseca (Spanish pronunciation: [aˈðɾjana fonˈseka]; born Adriana Fonseca Castellanos March 16, 1979) is a Mexican actress and dancer. She is best known for her roles in Televisa's telenovelas like La usurpadora as Veronica Soriano (1998), Rosalinda as Lucy Pérez Romero (1999), Mariana de la Noche as Caridad "Chachi" Montenegro (2003), Contra viento y marea as Sandra Serrano Rudell (2005), Bajo las riendas del amor as Montserrat Linares (2007) and for her role as the protagonist in Telemundo's successful telenovela Corazón Valiente as Angela Valdez (2012).

== Biography ==
Fonseca was born on March 16, 1979, in Veracruz, Veracruz, Mexico. She is the daughter of dentists Hugo Fonseca and Guillermina Castellanos. She has one brother Hugo and one sister Jacqueline. She started her acting career by performing in a local television show. At 16, she was accepted into the C.E.A. (Centro de Education Artistica) in Mexico. After winning the award in the "El rostro de El Heraldo de México" competition in 1997, she participated in the soap opera La usurpadora. Fonseca had a lead role in the soap opera Rosalinda playing the little sister of Rosalinda, Lucy.

She has joined Telemundo network and she successfully played her main protagonist role in Corazón Valiente, alongside Ximena Duque, Aylin Mujica and José Luis Reséndez.

== Filmography ==
=== Film ===
| Year | Title | Role | Notes |
|---|---|---|---|
| 2003 | La tregua | Laura Avellaneda | Film debut |
| 2004 | Por mujeres como tú | | |
| 2004 | 7 mujeres, 1 homosexual y Carlos | Camila | |
| 2012 | Por tú culpa | Sara | |
| 2014 | FriendZone | Emma | Short film |
| 2017 | Escape From Ensenada | Manuela | |
| 2022 | Valentino, Be Your Own Hero Or Villain | Marcia | |

=== Television ===
| Year | Title | Role | Notes |
|---|---|---|---|
| 1997 | Pueblo chico, infierno grande | Jovita | Television debut |
| 1998 | La usurpadora | Verónica Soriano | |
| 1998 | Más allá de la usurpadora | Verónica Soriano | Television film |
| 1998 | Preciosa | Vanessa | |
| 1998 | Gotita de amor | Paulina | |
| 1999 | Rosalinda | Lucía Pérez Romero | |
| 2000 | Amigos x siempre | Melissa Escobar | |
| 2001 | Mujer bonita | Charito | 10 episodes |
| 2001 | Atrévete a olvidarme | Andrea Rosales "La Guapa" | |
| 2003-2004 | Mariana de la noche | Caridad "Chachi" Montenegro | |
| 2005 | Contra viento y marea | Sandra Serrano Rudell | |
| 2005 | Bailando por un sueño | Herself | TV program |
| 2007 | Bajo las riendas del amor | Montserrat Linares | |
| 2009 | Mujeres asesinas | Cecilia | "Cecilia, prohibida" (Season 2, Episode 10) |
| 2010 | Tú decides | | Television film |
| 2012 | Corazón valiente | Ángela Valdez | Main role; 206 episodes |
| 2021 | Mi fortuna es amarte | Lucía Nieto Paz | |
| 2024 | Papás por conveniencia | Paulina | |

== Awards and nominations ==
=== Premios TVyNovelas ===
| Year | Category | Telenovela | Result |
|---|---|---|---|
| 2004 | Best Co-star Actress | Mariana de la Noche | Nominated |

=== Premios People en Español ===
| Year | Category | Telenovela | Result |
|---|---|---|---|
| 2012 | Best Actress | Corazón Valiente | Nominated |
