= Édgar Ponce =

Mexican actor and dancer

- Born: Édgar Ponce Garcia; 27 December 1974; Mexico City, México
- Died: 5 May 2005 (aged 30); Mexico City, México
- Occupation(s): Actor and dancer

Édgar Ponce García (27 December 1974 – 5 May 2005) was a Mexican actor and dancer. Ponce was a member of the male dance troupe Sólo Para Mujeres (For Women Only) and appeared in a number of soap operas (telenovelas) which were popular in both Mexico and the United States.

On 5 May 2005, while filming a commercial with his troupe in Mexico City, an overtaking car slammed into his motorcycle caravan, sending Ponce flying into the air and injuring three other actors. Ponce was rushed to the hospital but died early the next morning. Police charged the driver with involuntary homicide and detected alcohol on his breath, but believed he did not intend to kill Ponce. Ponce's co-star Poncho de Nigris accused the man of trying to hit them, stating, "the car didn't hit the brakes or anything".

Other controversies ensued due to the troupe riding on the central section of Mexico City ring road (Periférico) in violation of a local traffic bylaw requiring motorcycles to use the side lanes, as well as the actions of the producer, Sergio Mayer. Mayer was filming without permission and failed to ask for police assistance; authorities warned he could be charged with a crime.

== Telenovelas ==
- Soñadoras (1998-1999) as Leonardo
- Nunca te olvidaré (1999) as Adrián
- Cuento de Navidad (1999-2000)
- Alma rebelde (1999) as Chente
- El precio de tu amor (2000-2001) as Arnoldo
- Atrévete a olvidarme (2001) as Soriano
- Amigas y rivales (2001) as Ricardo
- El Manantial (2001-2002) as Chief of Judicial Police of San Andrés
- Salomé (2001-2002) as Javier
- Las vías del amor (2002-2003) as Enrique's security guard
- Velo de novia (2003) as Nacho
