= Por amar sin ley =

Mexican telenovela

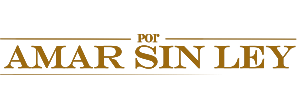
- Genre: Telenovela
- Based on: La ley del corazón by Mónica Agudelo
- Screenplay by: José Alberto Castro; Fernando Garcilita; Vanesa Varela
- Story by: Mónica Agudelo; Felipe Agudelo; Ricardo Sarmiento; Natalia Santa
- Directed by: Salvador Garcini; Alejandro Gamboa
- Creative director: Sandra Cortés
- Starring: Ana Brenda Contreras; David Zepeda; Julián Gil; José María Torre Hütt; Sergio Basañez; Altair Jarabo; Guillermo García Cantú; Pablo Valentín; Ilithya Manzanilla; Geraldine Bazán; Moisés Arizmendi; Manuel Balbi; Víctor García; Eva Cedeño; Azela Robinson; Roberto Ballesteros; Leticia Perdigón; Issabela Camil; Arlette Pacheco; Magda Karina; Lourdes Munguía; Polly; Daniela Álvarez
- Music by: Jorge Tena Martínez Vara
- Opening theme: "Por amar sin ley"
- Country of origin: Mexico
- Original language: Spanish
- No. of seasons: 2
- No. of episodes: 183 (list of episodes)

Production
- Executive producer: José Alberto Castro
- Producers: Ernesto Hernández; Fausto Sainz
- Production locations: Mexico City, Mexico; Cancún, Quintana Roo; Los Angeles, California, U.S.; New York City, New York, U.S.
- Cinematography: Ernesto Esteva; Esmeralda Cruz Cruz
- Editors: Juan Ordóñez; Arturo Rodríguez; Héctor Flores
- Camera setup: Multi-camera
- Production company: Televisa

Original release
- Network: Las Estrellas
- Release: 12 February 2018 – 5 July 2019

Related
- Médicos

Por amar sin ley (English title: Laws of love) is a Mexican telenovela produced by José Alberto Castro that premiered on Las Estrellas on 12 February 2018. It is a remake of a 2016 Colombian telenovela La ley del corazón. The telenovela revolves around the personal life and work of a group of lawyers belonging to a prestigious law firm.

Castro had said that he did not know whether he would carry out a third season of the telenovela, but he left open all the elements to continue it if Televisa decided to do it later. On 7 February 2020, Castro confirmed that the series had been renewed for a third season.

== Plot ==
The series follows the life of a group of lawyers who work for the firm Vega y Asociados founded by Alonso Vega (Guillermo García Cantú). The main characters are Alejandra (Ana Brenda Contreras), Ricardo (David Zepeda) and Carlos (Julián Gil). After the police imprison Carlos for the death of a prostitute, Alejandra begins to work for Vega y Asociados and begins to be attracted to Ricardo, but Carlos, after seeing this, decides to do everything possible to separate them together with the help of Elena (Geraldine Bazán). On the other hand, are Victoria (Altair Jarabo) and Roberto (José María Torre Hütt), Roberto tries to seduce her, but she refuses to fall into his game, Benjamín (Pablo Valentín) and Leticia (Eva Cedeño), two ambitious lawyers who are lovers, Olivia (Ilithya Manzanilla) who is madly in love with Leonardo (Manuel Balbi), but he only has eyes for his work, Gustavo (Sergio Basañez), who after a bad decision ends his marriage, and Juan López (Víctor García), a lawyer who admires the firm Vega y Asociados and wishes to obtain a position in that law firm.

== Cast and characters ==
- Ana Brenda Contreras as Alejandra Ponce, she is a lawyer in family cases.
- David Zepeda as Ricardo Bustamante, he is a senior lawyer in family cases, Elena's ex-husband.
- Julián Gil as Carlos Ibarra, he is a prestigious lawyer.
- José María Torre Hütt as Roberto Morelli, he is an attorney lawyer of Vega y Asociado.
- Sergio Basañez as Gustavo Soto, is a lawyer for Vega and Asociados.
- Altair Jarabo as Victoria Escalante, lawyer of Vega y Asociados, she has an interest in Roberto, but does not show it.
- Guillermo García Cantú as Alonso Vega, he is the owner of the law firm Vega y Asociados.
- Pablo Valentín as Benjamín Acosta, ambitious lawyer of the company Vega Y Asociado. (season 1)
- Ilithya Manzanilla as Olivia Suárez, she is a dedicated lawyer in cases of family abuse. (season 1)
- Geraldine Bazán as Elena Fernández, ex-wife of Ricardo.
- Moisés Arizmendi as Alan Páez, Carlos cousin.
- Manuel Balbi as Leonardo Morán, lawyer of Vega y Asociado. (season 1)
- Víctor García as Juan López, independent lawyer who then starts working for Vega y Asociados.
- Eva Cedeño as Leticia Jara, junior lawyer of Vega y Asociado, Benjamin's lover. (season 1)
- Azela Robinson as Paula Ortega, Alejandra's mother.
- Roberto Ballesteros as Jaime Ponce, Alejandra's father.
- Leticia Perdigón as Susana López, Juan's mother.
- Issabela Camil as Isabel, Gustavo's wife. (season 1)
- Arlette Pacheco as Carmen, secretary of Vega y Asociados.
- Magda Karina as Sonia, prosecutor of the public ministry. (season 1)
- Nataly Umaña as Tatiana, she is Patricia Linares friend.
- Lourdes Munguía as Lourdes, she is the best friend of Paula.
- Polly as Alicia, she is the best friend of Paula.
- Daniela Álvarez as Fer, neighbor of Juan and Susana, help Juan to do research.
- Kimberly Dos Ramos as Sofía Alcocer (guest, season 1; main, season 2)
- Marco Méndez as Javier Rivas (season 2)
- Axel Ricco as El Ciego (guest, season 1; main, season 2)
- Alejandra García as Lorena Fuentes (season 2)
- Mar Zamora as Nancy Muñoz (season 2)
- Julio Vallado as Manuel Durán (season 2)
- Mauricio Rousselon as Raúl (season 2)
- Marc Clotet as Adrián Carballo (season 2)
- Alejandro Tommasi as Nicolás (guest, season 1; main, season 2)
- Karina Ancira (season 2)
- Elías Campo as El Chivo (season 2)
- Diego Val as El Cuervo (season 2)
- Lucía Silva as Michelle (season 2)

== Episodes ==
Series	Episodes	Originally released	
Series	Episodes	First released	Last released
1	92	12 February 2018	17 June 2018
2	91	3 March 2019	5 July 2019

== Production ==
The start of production began on 6 November 2017, and concluded in May 2018. On 10 May 2018, Univision revealed through its upfront for the 2018-19 television season that the series renewed for a second season. The second season premiered on 3 March 2019. Filming for the second season commenced on 11 June 2018.

== Ratings ==
=== Mexico ratings ===
Viewership and ratings per season of Por amar sin ley
Season	Episodes	First aired		Last aired		Avg. viewers (millions)
Season	Episodes	Date	Viewers (millions)	Date	Viewers (millions)	Avg. viewers (millions)
1	92	12 February 2018	3.1	17 June 2018	5.8	2.92
2	88 (Note: Should reflect the number of episodes that contribute to the average given in the last column.)	3 March 2019	3.1	5 July 2019	2.7	2.76

=== U.S. ratings ===
Viewership and ratings per season of Por amar sin ley
Season	Episodes	First aired		Last aired		Avg. viewers (millions)
Season	Episodes	Date	Viewers (millions)	Date	Viewers (millions)	Avg. viewers (millions)
1	87	5 March 2018	1.58	6 July 2018	1.64	1.52
2	84	12 March 2019	1.19	26 July 2019	1.17	1.15

== Awards and nominations ==
Year	Award	Category	Nominated	Result
2019	TVyNovelas Awards	Best Telenovela of the Year	José Alberto Castro	Nominated
2019	TVyNovelas Awards	Best Actor	David Zepeda	Nominated
2019	TVyNovelas Awards	Best Antagonist Actor	Julián Gil	Nominated
2019	TVyNovelas Awards	Best Leading Actor	Guillermo García Cantú	Nominated
2019	TVyNovelas Awards	Best Co-lead Actress	Altair Jarabo	Nominated
2019	TVyNovelas Awards	Best Co-lead Actor	José María Torre	Nominated
2019	TVyNovelas Awards	Best Original Story or Adaptation	Mónica Agudelo, José Alberto Castro, Vanesa Varela, and Fernando Garcilita	Nominated
2019	TVyNovelas Awards	Best Direction of the Cameras	Bernardo Najera and Mauricio Manzano	Nominated
2019	TVyNovelas Awards	Best Cast	Por amar sin ley	Nominated
2020	TVyNovelas Awards	Best Telenovela of the Year	José Alberto Castro	Nominated
2020	TVyNovelas Awards	Best Leading Actor	Guillermo García Cantú	Nominated
2020	TVyNovelas Awards	Best Original Story or Adaptation	Vanesa Varela, Fernando Garcilita and José Alberto Castro	Nominated
2020	TVyNovelas Los Favoritos del Público	The Most Handsome Villain	Julián Gil	Nominated
2020	TVyNovelas Los Favoritos del Público	The Most Handsome Guy	David Zepeda	Nominated
2020	TVyNovelas Los Favoritos del Público	The Most Handsome Senior	Guillermo García Cantú	Nominated
2020	TVyNovelas Los Favoritos del Público	Best Finale	José Alberto Castro	Nominated
2020	TVyNovelas Los Favoritos del Público	Best Cast	José Alberto Castro	Nominated
