= Heart's Decree =

Television series

- Genre: Telenovela
- Created by: Mónica Agudelo Tenorio
- Written by: Ricardo Sarmiento; Natalia Santa
- Screenplay by: Felipe Agudelo
- Directed by: Sergio Osorio; Víctor Mallarino
- Creative director: Ana Paula Zamudio
- Starring: Luciano D'Alessandro; Laura Londoño; Sebastián Martínez; Iván López; Mabel Moreno; Lina Tejeiro; Rodrigo Candamil; Manuel Sarmiento; Mario Ruíz; Yesenia Valencia; Carlos Benjumea; Judy Henríquez; Juan Pablo Barragán
- Opening theme: "Me Llamas" by Piso 21
- Country of origin: Colombia
- Original language: Spanish
- No. of seasons: 2
- No. of episodes: 277

Production
- Executive producer: Jorge Giraldo
- Producers: Fernando Gaitán; Cristina Palacios
- Production location: Colombia
- Cinematography: Alfonso Parra
- Camera setup: Multi-camera
- Production company: RCN Televisión

Original release
- Network: RCN
- Release: November 28, 2016 – April 22, 2019

Related
- Por amar sin ley

Heart's Decree (Spanish: La ley del corazón) is a Colombian telenovela created by Mónica Agudelo Tenorio and adapted for television by Felipe Agudelo. It is dedicated to the memory of Agudelo after her death in 2012. It started airing on Colombian broadcast channel RCN Televisión on November 28, 2016. The series is available in 4K Ultra-high-definition television.

It stars Luciano D'Alessandro as Pablo Domínguez and Laura Londoño as Julia Escallón, with Sebastián Martínez, Iván López, Mabel Moreno, Lina Tejeiro, Rodrigo Candamil, Manuel Sarmiento, Mario Ruíz, Yesenia Valencia, Carlos Benjumea, Judy Henríquez, Laura de León and Juan Pablo Barragán in the main roles respectively.

On June 12, 2017, RCN Televisión confirmed that the series would be renewed for a second season, which premiered on September 10, 2018. The show ended on April 22, 2019.

== Plot summary ==
The series takes place in a successful law firm specialized in family law, dedicated to cases of separation and in general to family and relationship conflicts. Pablo Domínguez (Luciano D'Alessandro), a partner at the firm Cabal-Ortega-Domínguez and associates, is going through a difficult situation in his life when separating from his wife Jimena (Carolina Acevedo). Suddenly, the lawyer meets his colleague Julia Escallón (Laura Londoño), who is about to marry Camilo Borrero (Sebastián Martínez), but a twist of fate will change her life and bring her closer to Pablo. The show features the love triangle between Julia, Pablo, and Camilo, and the twists and turns in the love lives of the other lawyers in the firm, with their personal lives often mirrored in the legal cases they are defending.

== Cast ==
=== Main ===
- Luciano D'Alessandro as Pablo Domínguez
- Laura Londoño as Julia Escallón
- Sebastián Martínez as Camilo Borrero
- Laura de León as Lucía Vallejo
- Iván López as Nicolás Ortega
- Mabel Moreno as María del Pilar Garcés
- Lina Tejeiro as Catalina Mejía
- Rodrigo Candamil as Alfredo Duperly
- Manuel Sarmiento as Iván Estéfan
- Mario Ruíz as Elías Rodríguez
- Yesenia Valencia as Rosa Ferro
- Carlos Benjumea as Hernando Cabal
- Judy Henríquez as Carmen Valdenebro
- Juan Pablo Barragán as Marcos Tibatá
- Jorge Cao as Alonso Duarte
- Alejandra Borrero as Adela Zambrano
- Fernando Arévalo as Murcial Mahecha
- Mario Espitia as Valentín Bechara
- Giovanna Andrade as Macarena Soler
- Carlos Congote as Tony Ricaurte

=== Recurring ===
- Carolina Acevedo as Jimena Rivera
- Luz Stella Luengas as Tereza de Rivera
- Amparo Conde as Dolores Lolita
- Victoria Góngora as Isabel Triana de Rodríguez
- Jairo Camargo as Ramón Duperly
- María Helena Doering as Beatriz de Duperly
- Juan Pablo Posada as Roberto Martínez
- Helena Mallarino as María Cristina Correa
- Luis Fernando Bohórquez as Miguel
- Kimberly Reyes as Ana María
- Carolina López as Patricia Ramírez
- Estefanía Borge as Manuela Cáceres
- Mauricio Mejía as Darío
- Marianela González as Irene
- Brenda Hanst as Liliana González
- Javier Gnecco as Jaime Escallón
- Tuto Patiño as Patricio "Pato"
- Johan Velandia as Álvaro Durán
- Nicolás Rincón as Andrés Borrero
- Luly Bossa as Luisa Fernanda Barrera
- Carmenza Cossío as Helena Londoño
- Florina Lemaitre as Natalia Santamaría
- Carolina Cuervo as Inés
- Juana del Río as María Fernanda Segura
- Juan Carlos Vargas as Rendón
- Santiago Bejarano as Zamora
- María José Martínez as Silvia López
- Marcos Gómez as Francisco
- Diego Camargo as Matías
- Kristina Lilley as María Eugenia Domínguez
- Pepe Sánchez as Samuel Ortega
- Jorge Cárdenas as Leonardo Tapia
- Margalida Castro as Doña Astrid
- Bibiana Navas as Yolanda
- Carla Giraldo as Josefina
- Patricia Castañeda as Marcela
- Ángela Piedrahíta as Patricia
- Andrés Suárez as Dr. Ángel
- Paula Castaño as Nina Grinberg
- Natasha Klauss as Jueza
- Gerardo Calero as Juez
- Juan David Agudelo as Mateo Zaragosa
- Norma Nivia as Esther
- Eileen Roca as Adelaida de Ricaurte
- Jorge Melo as Juez Paz
- Juan Sebastián Calero as Paul Ricaurte
- Abril Schreiber as Camila Salamanca
- Marcela Gallego as Belén
- Amparo Grisales as Iris Mendoza
- Estefanía Piñeres as Aguasanta Mendoza/Aguasanta Ortega Mendoza
- Andrea Gómez as Eloisa Jiménez
- Edinson Gil as Santiago Olarte Zambrano

=== Guest ===
- Jaime Santos as Alberto Borrero
- Kepa Amuchastegui as Alberto Silva
- Mónica del Pilar Leyton as Elvia
- Sandy Suárez as Capitana Berta Luján
- Carlos Torres as Mario Aristizábal
- Alexandra Serrano as Olga Buitrago
- Adriana Arango as Virginia de Triana
- Naren Daryanani as Rick Santoyo
- Martha Liliana Restrepo as Afrodita de Santoyo
- Jorge Enrique Abello as Don Carlos Díaz/Segundo Camargo
- Susana Torres as Carolina de Silva
- Orlando Valenzuela as Julián Triana
- Coraima Torres as Marisela Villamil
- José Julián Gaviria as Manolo Granada
- Pedro Calvo as Rubén Granada
- Pedro Roda as Ignacio
- Juliana Gómez as Tatiana Cortés
- Elianis Garrido as Luna
- Zharick León as Marcela Gutiérrez
- Geraldine Zivic as Victoria Sáenz de Morales
- Nicolás Montero as Gustavo Morales
- Germán Escallón as Rómulo Pinzón
- Susana Rojas as Luz Dary Ramírez
- Isabella Santodomingo as Tammy
- Juan David Galindo as Milton Pinzón
- Consuelo Luzardo as Paulina Álvarez de Montoya
- Marcela Posada as Elvira de Arango
- Diego Vélez as Jorge Arango
- Carlos Camacho as Sergio Sarmiento
- Noëlle Schonwald as Rosario Ruiz
- Shirley Gómez as Milena Gómez Sánchez
- Sebastián Boscán as Alejandro Santana
- Genoveva Caro as Claudia de Santana
- Andrés Béjar as Santiago Bernal
- Shany Nadan as Laura vda de Bernal
- Ernesto Benjumea as Fabio Ruiz
- Katherine Vélez as Irma de Ruiz
- Lucho Velasco as Rogelio Soto
- Ricardo Vélez as Orlando Castillo
- Margarita Reyes as Viviana de Castillo
- Julio Sánchez Coccaro as Salvador Rodríguez
- Álvaro García as Mateo de Rodríguez
- Emilia Ceballos as Raquel
- Esmeralda Pinzón as Magdalena de Fajardo
- Mauricio Puentes as Gonzalo Fajardo
- Ana María Medina as Marisol Callejas
- Jorge Herrera as Constancio Platas
- Diana Wiswell as Lourdes Arrúgula
- Fernando Solórzano as Rodolfo Mesa
- Natalia Durán as Lorena Duque
- Jorge López as Rafael Ibáñez
- Agmeth Escaf as Esteban Moncada
- Julio Cesar Luna as Víctor Zabaleta
- Alejandro Riaño as Juanpis González

== Series overview ==
Season	Episodes	Originally released	
Season	Episodes	First released	Last released
1	131	November 28, 2016	June 12, 2017
2	146	September 10, 2018	April 22, 2019

== Adaptations ==
After the success in Colombia, Televisa made an adaptation of the telenovela with the title of Por amar sin ley, this adaptation was released in 2018. On October 18, 2017, it was confirmed that the main actress of the series Grey's Anatomy Ellen Pompeo, would produce a version of the telenovela for the United States with the title of Big Law. On October 19, 2017, Mega acquired the rights to the telenovela to make its own version.

== Ratings ==
Viewership and ratings per season of Heart's Decree
Season	Timeslot (CT)	Episodes	First aired		Last aired		Avg. viewers (millions)	18–49 rank
Season	Timeslot (CT)	Episodes	Date	Viewers (millions)	Date	Viewers (millions)	Avg. viewers (millions)	18–49 rank
1	Mon–Fri 9:00pm	131	November 28, 2016	7.9	June 12, 2017	12.2	28.4	TBD

== Awards and nominations ==
Year	Category	Recipient	Result
India Catalina Awards
2017	Best Telenovela or Serie		Nominated
2017	Favorite Production of the Public		Won
2017	Best Director of Telenovela or Serie	Víctor Mallarino and Sergio Osorio	Nominated
2017	Best Telenovela or Series Libretto (original or adaptation)	Mónica Agudelo and Felipe Agudelo	Nominated
2017	Best Lead Actor of Telenovela or Serie	Luciano D'Alessandro	Nominated
2017	Best Lead Actress of Telenovela or Serie	Laura Londoño	Nominated
2017	Best Male Antagonist of Telenovela or Series	Sebastián Martínez	Nominated
2017	Best Female Antagonist of Telenovela or Series	Carolina Acevedo	Nominated
2017	Best Supporting Actor of Telenovela or Series	Iván López	Nominated
2017	Best Supporting Actor of Telenovela or Series	Rodrigo Candamil	Nominated
2017	Best Supporting Actress of Telenovela or Series	Mabel Moreno	Nominated
2017	Best Supporting Actress of Telenovela or Series	Helena Mallarino	Nominated
2017	Best Revelation of the Year	Juana del Río	Nominated
2017	Best Soundtrack of Telenovela or Series	Oliver Camargo, José Carlos María and Nicolás Uribe	Nominated
2017	Best Edition of Telenovela or Series	Marcela Vásquez	Nominated
2017	Best Creative Director of Telenovela or Series	Ana Paula Zamudio	Nominated
2017	Best Telenovela or Series Photograph	Alfonso Parra	Nominated
TVyNovelas Awards Colombia
2017	Best Telenovela		Won
2017	Favorite Director of Telenovela or Series	Víctor Mallarino and Sergio Osorio	Won
2017	Favorite Author of Telenovela or Series	Mónica Agudelo and Felipe Agudelo	Won
2017	Favorite Lead Actress of Telenovela	Laura Londoño	Won
2017	Favorite Lead Actor of Telenovela	Luciano D'Alessandro	Won
2017	Favorite Female Villain of Telenovela	Carolina Acevedo	Won
2017	Favorite Male Villain of Telenovela	Sebastián Martínez	Won
2017	Favorite Best Supporting Actress of Telenovela	Lina Tejeiro	Won
2017	Favorite Best Supporting Actress of Telenovela	Helena Mallarino	Nominated
2017	Favorite Best Supporting Actress of Telenovela	Mabel Moreno	Nominated
2017	Favorite Best Supporting Actor of Telenovela	Iván López	Won
2017	Favorite Best Supporting Actor of Telenovela	Rodrigo Candamil	Nominated
2017	Favorite Best Supporting Actor of Telenovela	Juan Pablo Barragán	Nominated
2017	Best Revelation of the Year	Juana del Río	Nominated
2017	Best Musical theme of Telenovela or Series	"Me Llamas" by Piso 21	Won
