= Melissa Barrera on screen and on stage =

Mexican actress and singer

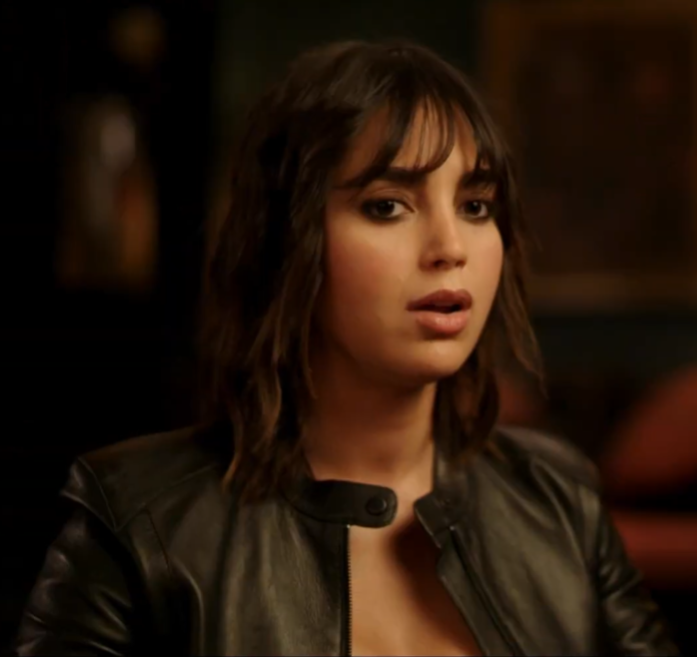
Barrera in 2024

Melissa Barrera is a Mexican actress, known for her work in telenovelas, serial dramas, and horror films.

== Filmography ==
Key
†	Denotes films that have not yet been released

=== Film ===
Year	Title	Role	Notes	Ref.
2010	L for Leisure	Kennedy		
2016	The Hotel	Karina		
2016	Beginner's Manual To Be President	Brisa Carreiro		
2018	Shake Off Your Sorrows	Luisa Martin Del Campo		
2018	Twice You	Daniela Cohen		
2021	In the Heights	Vanessa Morales		
2021	All the World Is Sleeping	Chama Valentina		
2021	Making Mallinache: A Documentary by Nacho Cano	Malinalli Tenepal	Documentary film	
2022	Scream	Samantha "Sam" Carpenter		
2022	Carmen	Carmen		
2022	Bed Rest	Julie Rivers	Also producer	
2023	Scream VI	Samantha "Sam" Carpenter		
2024	Your Monster	Laura Franco	Also producer	
2024	Abigail	Ana Lucia ''Joey'' Cruz		
TBA	In The Cradle of Granite †	TBA	Pre-production	
TBA	The One †	Taylor	Pre-production	
TBA	The Collaboration †	Maya	Post-production	
TBA	Black Tides †	Rebecca Pierce	Post-production	
TBA	Inhabit †	TBA	In development	

=== Television ===
Year	Title	Role	Notes	Ref.
2011	La Academia	Herself	Contestant; 14 episodes	
2012	La mujer de Judas	Zulema ''Zulamita'' Sanchez	Recurring role; 3 episodes	
2012–2013	La otra cara del alma	Mariana Durán	Recurring role; 6 episodes	
2014	Siempre tuya Acapulco	Olvido Pérez	Main role	
2015	Tanto amor	Mía González	Main role	
2016–2017	Perseguidos	Laura Solis	Recurring role; 11 episodes	
2017	Club de Cuervos	Isabel Cantú	Main role; (season 3)	
2018–2020	Vida	Lynda "Lyn" Hernandez	Main role	
2020	Acting for a Cause	Elizabeth Bennet	Episode: "Pride and Prejudice"	
2022	Keep Breathing	Olivia "Liv" Rivera	Main role	
2025	The Copenhagen Test	Michelle Cyr	Main role	

=== Music videos ===
Year	Title	Artist
2019	''Melissa''	Xavier Zazueta
2021	''Say Less''	Anthony Ramos

== Stage ==
Year	Title	Role	Venue	Notes
2004	The Wizard of Oz	Tree #3	American School Foundation of Monterrey	School productions
2005	Grease	Betty Rizzo	American School Foundation of Monterrey	School productions
2006	Aida	Amneris, the Princess of Egypt	American School Foundation of Monterrey	School productions
2007	Romeo and Juliet	Juliet Capulet	Teatro de la Ciudad	Professional stage debut
2008	Footloose	Ariel Moore	Teatro de la Ciudad	
2010	Sweet Charity	Charity Hope Valentine	New York University Tisch School of the Arts, Collaborative Arts Project 21, Off-Broadway	Off-Broadway debut
2010	The Caucasian Chalk Circle	Grusche Vachnadze	New York University Tisch School of the Arts, Collaborative Arts Project 21, Off-Broadway	
2013	Spring Awakening	Wendla Bergman	Teatro de la Ciudad	
2015	Hoy no me puedo levantar	María	Teatro Aldama	
2016	Young Frankenstein	Inga Frankenstein	Teatro Aldama	
2026	Titanique	Rose DeWitt Bukater	St. James Theatre, Broadway	Broadway debut

== As a producer ==
Year	Title	Notes
2022	Bed Rest	Co-producer
2022	Land of Gold	Executive producer
2024	Your Monster	Co-producer
2025	Traces of Home	Executive producer; documentary film
2026	Life Support	Executive producer; documentary film

== See also ==
- List of awards and nominations received by Melissa Barrera
