= Melissa Barrera discography =

Discography of Melissa Barrera

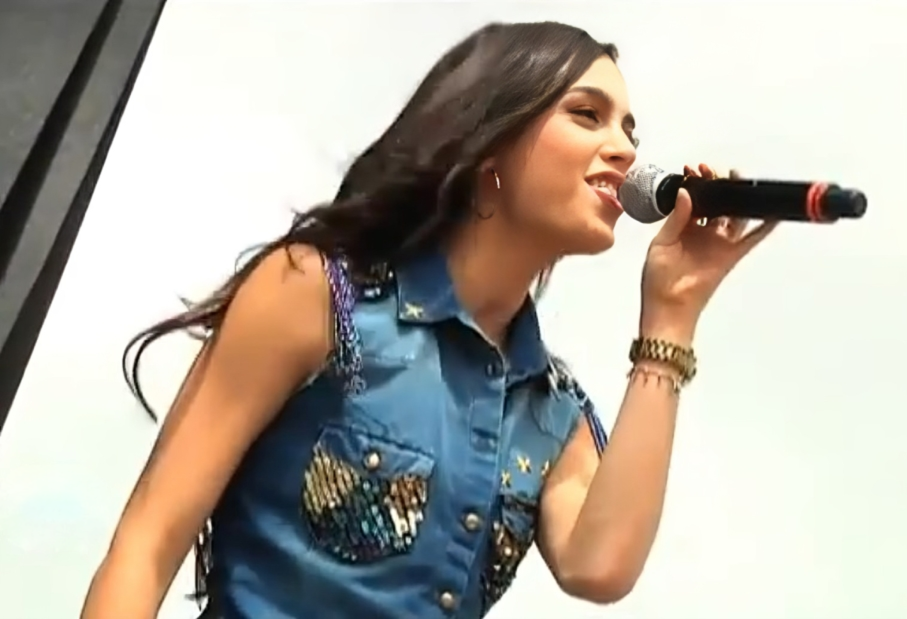
- Barrera performing in 2013
- Studio albums: 1
- Soundtrack albums: 3
- Singles: 4

Mexican actress and singer-songwriter Melissa Barrera has released one studio album, three soundtrack albums, and five singles. Barrera began her musical career in 2011 as a contestant on the Mexican reality show La Academia. In 2013, she debuted as part of the musical duo Melissa y Sebastian, releasing their self-titled album and achieving a top-ten radio hit in Mexico with their cover of "Mamma Maria".

Barrera's commercial breakthrough in the United States occurred in 2021 with the film adaptation of the musical In the Heights. According to Billboard, the film's soundtrack debuted at number one on the Top Soundtracks chart and reached number 45 on the Billboard 200. She has since contributed lead vocals to the operatic soundtrack of Carmen (2022), a collaboration with composer Nicholas Britell, and the 2024 horror-musical Your Monster. Additionally, she recorded the theme song "Volver a caer" alongside Kalimba for the telenovela Tanto amor.

== Studio albums ==
=== Studio albums ===
List of studio albums, with selected details, chart positions, sales, and certifications
Title	Studio album details	Peak chart positions
Title	Studio album details	MEX
Melissa y Sebastian	Release date: 3 December 2013; Label: Azteca Music; Formats: Digital download, streaming	—
"—" denotes a recording that did not chart or was not released in that territory.

== Soundtrack albums ==
=== Soundtrack albums ===
List of soundtrack albums, with selected chart positions
Title	Details	Peak chart positions			
Title	Details	US	AUS	CAN	UK
In the Heights (with Anthony Ramos)	Release date: 10 June 2021; Label: Atlantic Records/WaterTower Music; Formats: CD, digital download, streaming	45	—	—	—
Carmen (with Paul Mescal)	Release date: 21 April 2023; Label: Sony Masterworks; Formats: CD, digital download, streaming	—	—	—	—
Your Monster	Release date: 25 October 2024; Label: MovieScore Media/Vertical Entertainment; Formats: Digital download, streaming	—	—	—	—
"—" denotes items which did not chart in that country.

== Singles ==
List of singles as lead artist, showing year released and originating album
Title	Year	Album
"Mamma Maria"	2013	Melissa y Sebastian
''Volver a caer" (featuring Kalimba)	2015	Tanto amor
"Stay Home With Me''	2020	Non-album singles
"'Una y Otra Vez'' (with Rosanna, Regina and Mayelah Barrera)	2021	Non-album singles
"—" denotes a recording that did not chart or was not released in that territory.

== See also ==
- Melissa Barrera on screen and on stage
- List of awards and nominations received by Melissa Barrera
