= Vertical (film company) =

American independent film distributor

- Formerly: Vertical Entertainment (2012–23)
- Type: Private
- Industry: Motion picture
- Founded: September 2012; 13 years ago
- Founder: Rich Goldberg and Mitch Budin
- Headquarters: Santa Monica, California, United States
- Key people: Rich Goldberg, Peter Jarowey, Mitch Budin, Jason Pecora, Kristin Harris, and Christian Dawahare
- Products: Motion pictures
- Website: vert-ent.com

Vertical (formerly Vertical Entertainment) is an American independent film distribution company founded by producers Rich Goldberg and Mitch Budin in 2012. Vertical releases films across all mediums, including theatrical, video on demand, physical media and streaming.

== History ==
In 2012, Rich Goldberg and Mitch Budin founded Vertical Entertainment, a film distribution company that releases films theatrically, through video on demand, home media and streaming, with a slate of 24 films per year. In November 2019, it was announced Vertical would launch a UK distribution arm.

Over the years, Vertical films have received numerous award wins and nominations, including an Academy Award Nomination for Best Original Song in Four Good Days, a Gotham Award for Best Actress, Nicole Beharie in Miss Juneteenth, an Independent Spirit Award for Best First Screenplay for Emily the Criminal, a Golden Globe Nomination for Best Original Song in She Came to Me and a Sundance audience award for Melissa Barrera in Your Monster. Vertical has now expanded its slate beyond 80 film releases per year.
