= Aura Cristina Geithner =

Colombian actress (born 1967)

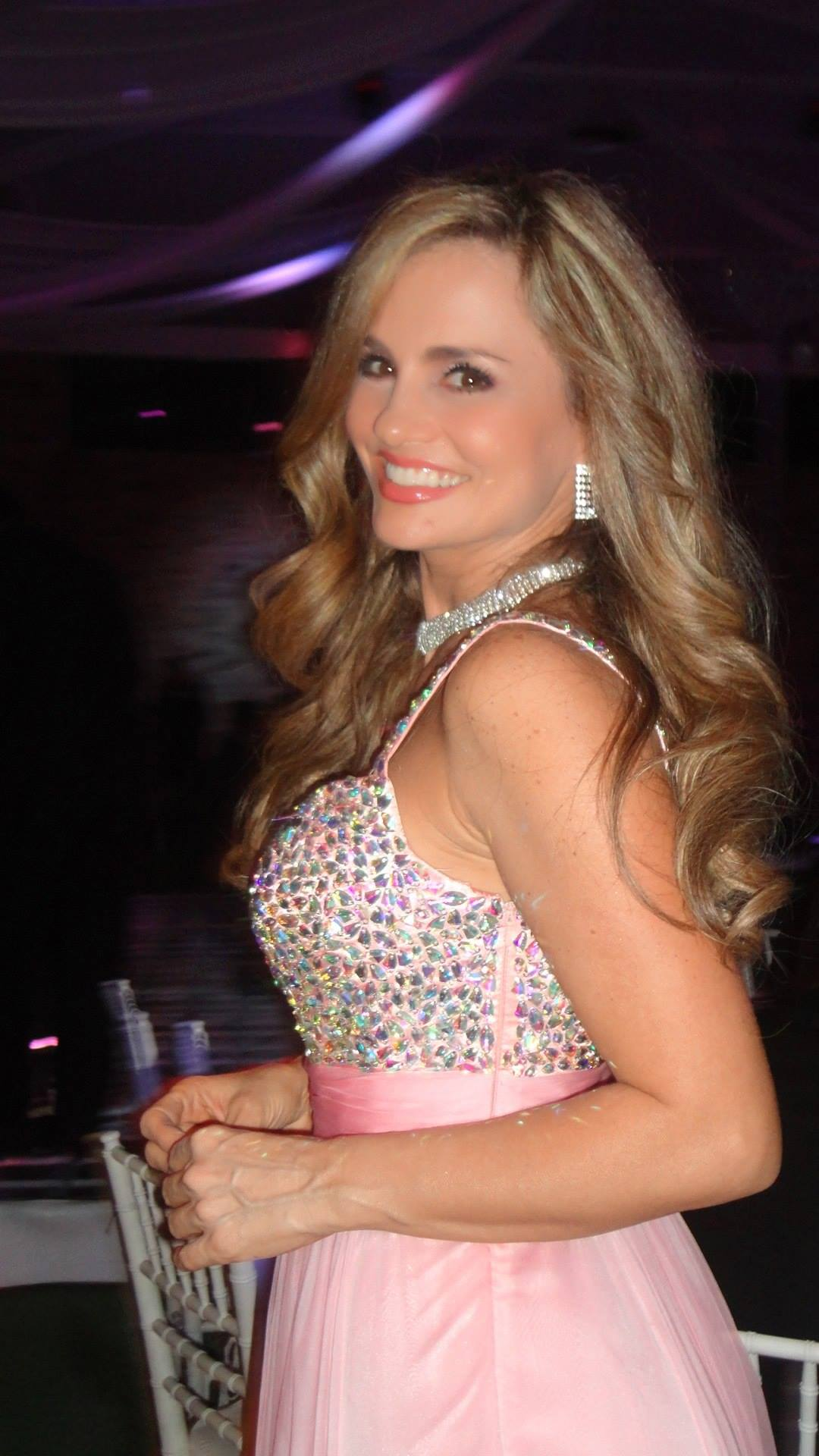
- Born: March 9, 1967 (age 59); Bogotá, Colombia
- Occupations: Actress, model, singer, philanthropist
- Website: www.auracristinageithner.com

Aura Cristina Geithner (born March 9, 1967) is a Colombian actress, model, singer and philanthropist. In her teens, she lived in Mexico and studied painting and international public relations. Her twin brother, Harry Geithner, is also an actor.

== Filmography ==
- La rosa de los vientos (1989) .... María Conchita – debut
- Te voy a enseñar a querer (1990) .... Diana Rivera – protagonist
- La casa de las dos palmas (1991) .... Zoraida Vélez – protagonist
- Sangre de lobos (1992).... Silvia Martínez – protagonist
- La potra Zaina (1993) .... Soledad Ahumada – protagonist
- Eternamente Manuela (1995) .... Manuela Quijano – protagonist
- Hombres (1997) .... María del Pilar Velázquez (Lilica) – protagonist
- Secreto de amor (2001) .... Barbara Serrano Zulbarán – Main antagonist
- Gata Salvaje (2003) .... Maribella Tovar – antagonist
- Luna, la heredera (2004) .... Daniela Lombardo – antagonist
- La tormenta (2005 – RTI/Telemundo) .... Bernarda Ayala – guest starring
- Decisiones (2005–2006 – RTI/Telemundo) – protagonist
- Las profesionales, a su servicio (2007) .... Beatriz González – protagonist
- Mujeres asesinas (2008 – RCN Televisión) .... Laura, la encubridora – protagonist
- Secretos del alma (2009 – TV Azteca) .... Laura Kuri – antagonist
- Cielo Rojo (2011 – Azteca).... Mariana de Molina-antagonist.
- Quererte Así (2012 – Azteca) .... Emilia Duncan – antagonist
- Los Rey (2012 – Azteca) – Lucero
- Siempre Tuya Acapulco (2014 – Azteca) .... Angustias Molina Vda. de Hernández – antagonist
- Tanto amor (2015 – Azteca) .... Altagracia Hernández de Roldán – antagonist
- Despertar contigo (2016 – Televisa) .... Antonia Santamaría – protagonist
- La hija pródiga (2017 – TV Azteca) .... Isabel Barragán de Montejo
- La casa de los famosos Colombia (2026 - RCN) ... Herself

== Discography ==
- Soundtrack of telenovela La casa de las dos palmas (1991) with Sonolux, Colombia
- Soundtrack of telenovela La potra zaina (1993) with Sonolux, Colombia
- Disco "Calor" (1994) with Sonolux, Colombia
1. La negra Celina
2. Para qué
3. Arco iris
4. Un besito
5. Ahora
6. Mi flauta
7. Yerbabuena
8. Leona
9. Luz del sol
10. Juana la marrana y el ladrón de pueblo
11. Arco iris ( Piano)
- Disco "Firme hasta el fin" (sin publicar) (1993) con Sonolux, Colombia

== Concerts ==
- Teatro Metropolitano de Medellín (Medellín Cultura) (1995)
- Club hípico Bacata (1995)
- Bolsa de valores (Cartagena -Plaza de la Aduana) (1995)
- Batallón de sanidad (Ministerio de Justicia) (1995)
- Presentación Medellín "Bar discoteca Fantasías" (1995)
- Presentación Barrio Kennedy (Sonolux) (1995)
- Concierto en la Ciudad de Bello (event "La defensa de la Vida del joven". Gobernación y La Organización Ardilla Lulle)
- Concierto plaza Bolívar (Cervecería Leona S.A.)(1995)
- Concierto ciudad de Cali "Inextra S.A." (1995)
- Concierto plaza Bolívar (Postobon) (1995)
- Presentación de rancheras Global Humanitaria (teatro Leonardos) (2008)
