= Harry Geithner =

Colombian actor, film director and producer

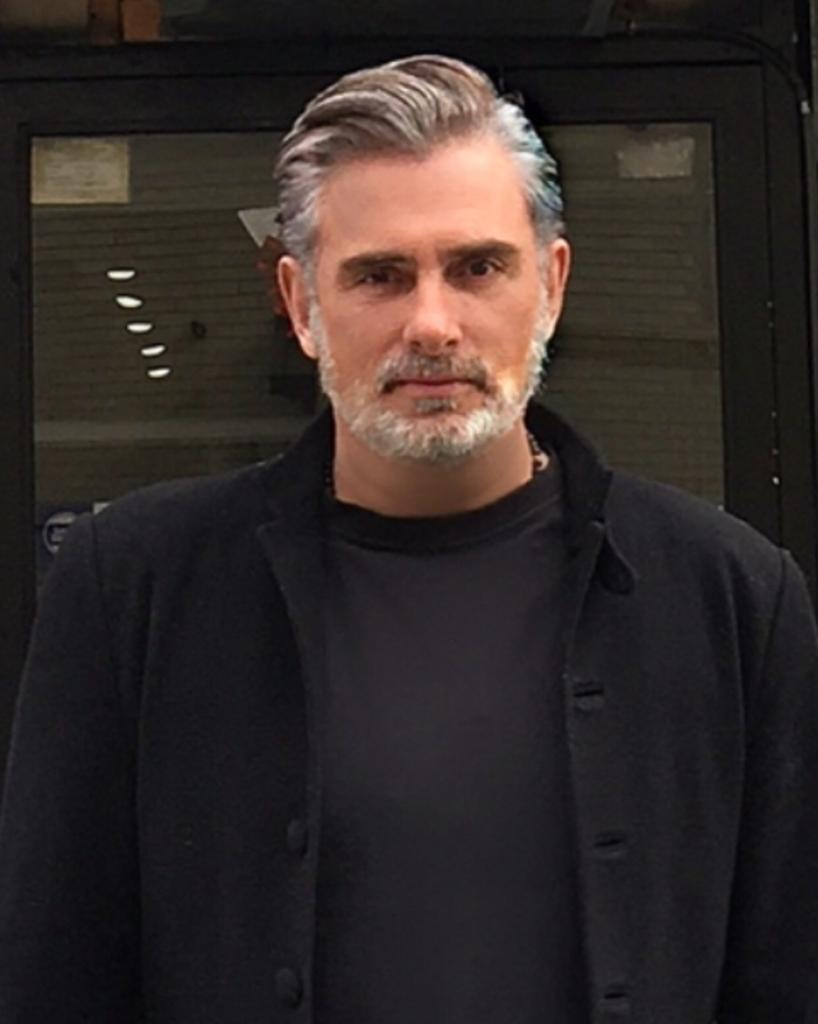
- Born: Harry Geithner Cuesta; March 9, 1967 (age 59); Bogota, Colombia
- Occupations: Actor, Film Director, Producer, CEO
- Years active: 1995–present
- Spouse: Alejandra Silva Geithner (m. 2020)
- Relatives: Aura Cristina Geithner (sister)

Harry Geithner Cuesta (Bogotá DC, Cundinamarca; March 9, 1967), known as Harry Geithner, is a Colombian actor, film director and producer known for being CEO of Geithnerland productions Inc., a production company, talent agency and content creator audiovisuals for film, theater, television and social networks located in New York City; where, in addition, acting classes, voice education, performing arts and accent neutralization are taught. One of his sisters (his twin) is Aura Cristina Geithner, a prominent actress and singer.

== Biography ==
Harry Geithner graduated with a Bachelor of Business Administration from the Monterrey Institute of Technology and Higher Education (ITESM) in Mexico City; and then he formed two companies: A publishing company called "EL MÉXICO MODERNO" and an Exporting and Importing company, called "HG" in both Mexico and Colombia. Harry is a professional photographer and in his youth he worked creating portfolios for young artists and aspiring actors.

At the age of 26 he began to study Dramatic Art, Philosophy and Letters, Voice Education, Performing Arts, Theater, Film and Television at the CONARTE Academy, in Colombia, being his great mentor, teacher Norman Karin. Later, he studied Television, Film and Theater in Mexico, at the MM Studio Academy of Patricia Reyes Spíndola.

In his native country, he participated in soap operas such as Café con aroma de mujer, Paloma, Sueños y Espejos, Momposina, De pies a cabeza, among others. He later traveled to Mexico, where he was hired by Televisa Network, in a Carla Estrada production to perform a villain character called "Lencho" in the telenovela Te sigo amando. This performance established him as the winner of the ACE award in New York in 1999.

In Mexico he received the Las Palmas de Oro award -in 1997- for his role in 'Te Sigo Amando' as Revelation Actor.

In 1998, he was awarded Las Palmas de Oro León in Mexico as 'Best Young Actor with the Greatest Impact on Television', awarded by the Círculo Nacional de Periodistas A.C.

Harry Geithner is also the winner of an Emmy Award for his work as co-host, along with Ana Maria Canseco. from the broadcast of the Tournament of Rose Parade in Pasadena, California on Univision.

From 1999 to 2001, Harry Geithner was the co-host of the television game show "A Que No Te Atreves", alongside actresses Sofia Vergara and Adriana Lavat. This program was a huge success in the United States, and was one of the most watched on the Univision network, produced by Cristina Saralegui.

Currently, Harry maintains a romantic relationship with the Argentine businesswoman Alejandra Soledad Silva, and both are based in New York City.

In the United States, Harry has received numerous recognitions and awards - Citations and Certificates of Merit as an outstanding citizen - from the government for his work and trajectory in acting for the Hispanic market in that country.

== Filmography ==
=== Films ===
Year	Title	Role	Notes
2000	Los Muertos No Hablan		
2002	Detrás del paraíso		
2002	Carreras parejeras		
2003	Carne de cañón		
2004	Zona de silencio - Paralelo 27	Julio	
2006	Testigo protegido		
2007	La santa muerte	Pablo	

=== Television ===
Year	Title	Role	Notes
1993	Café con aroma de mujer	Dr. Carmona	Television debut
1993	Sueños y espejos	Unknown role	
1996-97	Te sigo amando	Lencho	
1997	Mujer, casos de la vida real	Unknown role	"Video XXX" (Season 13, Episode 73)
1998	Ángela	Julián Arizpe	
2001	María Belén	Rogelio García Marín	
2002	Entre el amor y el odio	Everardo Castillo	
2003	Amor real	Teniente Yves Santibáñez De La Roquette	
2004	El escándalo del mediodía		
2004	Amy, la niña de la mochila azul	Dr. César Ballesteros	
2004-05	Inocente de ti	Gustavo	
2005	Nunca te diré adiós	Ricardo Alvarado	
2005-10	Don Francisco presenta		
2006	La verdad oculta	Leonardo Faidella	20 episodes
2007	El Zorro, la espada y la rosa	Comandante Ricardo Montero	
2007	Tiempo final	Hernán	"La adivina" (Season 1, Episode 4)
2008	La traición	Francisco "Paquito" de Morales	
2008	El juramento	Diego Platas	
2009	Los simuladores	Unknown role	"El precio de la fama" (Season 2, Episode 3)
2008	La traición	Francisco "Paquito" de Morales	
2009–10	Hasta que el dinero nos separe	Edgar Marino "El Zorro"	
2010-11	Eva Luna	Francisco Conti	
2011	No me hallo	Abelardo	15 episodes
2012	Mi sueño es bailar		
2012	Maldita	Esteban Zúñiga	22 episodes
2012–16	Como dice el dicho	Willy / Sebastián / René / Mauricio / Asdrúbal / Horacio	"Quien se fía de un lobo" (Season 2, Episode 64); "Hombre prevenido" (Season 3, Episode 8); "El tiempo todo lo alcanza" (Season 4, Episode 2); "Ni ausente sin culpa" (Season 4, Episode 18); "Lo que mucho se alaba" (Season 5, Episode 49); "Entre broma y broma, la verdad se asoma" (Season 6, Episode 78)
2012	Un refugio para el amor	Óscar Gaitan	
2013	Libre para amarte	Napoleón Vergara	
2014	Voltea pa' que te enamores	Doroteo Galíndez	
2015	Amores con trampa	Esteban Cifuentes	
2016	Un camino hacia el destino	Leopoldo Arellano Manrique	
2017	La rosa de Guadalupe	Patrón	″El hijo del amor″ (Season 9, Episode 13)
2018	Hijas de la luna	Gustavo Reina "El Divo"	
2018	Por amar sin ley	Jorge García	
2019	Silvia Pinal, frente a ti	Emilio Azcárraga Milmo	Bioserie
2020	100 días para enamorarnos	Bruno Casares	
2024	El amor no tiene receta	Elías Barral	Guest star

== Awards and nominations ==
=== Spanish People Awards ===
Year	Category	Telenovela	Result
2012	Best Secondary Actor	Un refugio para el amor	Nominated

=== Atlixco Film Festival (Mexico) ===
Year	Category	Film	Result
2020	Best Screenplay	Dormimos como vivimos	Winner
2021	Honorable Mention (Mezcal de Oro)	Focos Rojos	Winner

=== Hudson International Film Festival NYC ===
Year	Category	Film	Result
2021	Best Screenplay	Dormimos como vivimos	Winner
2021	Audience Choice Award	Dormimos como vivimos	Winner

=== Otros premios ===
- ACE Awards (Asociación de Cronistas del Espectáculo de New York)
- Palmas de Oro (Círculo Nacional de Periodistas de México)
- Palmas de Oro Leon (Círculo Nacional de Periodistas de México)
- Premio Paoli (Puerto Rico)
- Emmy Award (Univision - Pasadena, California)
- Micrófono de Oro 2019 (Asociación Nacional de Locutores de México A.C.)
- Certificate of Recognition 2019 (State of New York - Executive Chamber)
- Citation as prominent citizen (2019 - Office of the Executive - Nassau County - State of New York)
- Citation as prominent citizen (2019 - Awarded by Senator Kevin Thomas of the New York Senate)
- Certificate of Appreciation 2019 (City of Huntington Park, Los Angeles awarded by the mayor Karina Macias)
