= Melissa Barrera =

Mexican actress, singer-songwriter and producer (born 1990)

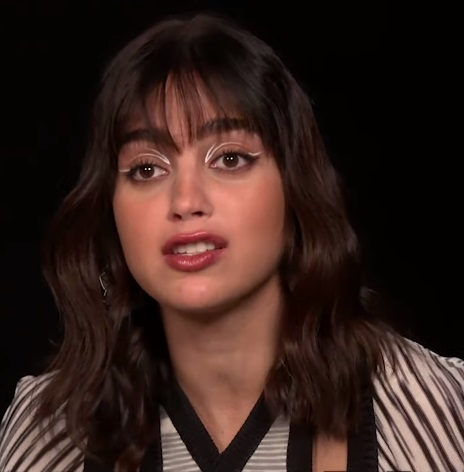
- Barrera in 2023
- Born: Melissa Barrera Martínez; 4 July 1990 (age 36); Monterrey, Nuevo León, Mexico
- Education: American School Foundation of Monterrey; New York University (BFA)
- Occupations: Actress; singer-songwriter; producer; executive producer; screenwriter; activist
- Years active: 2011–present
- Works: Full list
- Spouse: Xavier Zazueta (m. 2019)
- Awards: Full list
- Musical career
- Genre: Pop
- Instrument: Vocals
- Labels: Atlantic; Sony; Gracias Uniwerso; Azteca Music
- Formerly of: Melissa y Sebastian

Signature
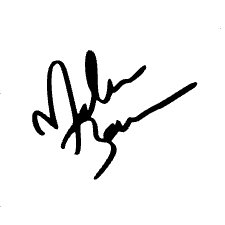

Melissa Barrera Martínez (Spanish pronunciation: [meˈlisa baˈrera marˈtines]; born 4 July 1990) is a Mexican actress, singer-songwriter, producer and activist. Her accolades include nominations for three Imagen Awards and a Satellite Award. ¡Hola! magazine named her one of the Top 100 Latina Powerhouses of 2022.

Barrera began her career in Mexico as the lead characters Olvido Pérez and Mia González in Azteca Uno's telenovelas Siempre tuya Acapulco (2014) and Tanto amor (2015), then joining in as socialite Isabel Cantú in the third season of the Netflix original series Club de Cuervos (2017).

Barrera transitioned to Hollywood by starring as Lynda ''Lyn'' Hernandez in the Starz comedy-drama series Vida (2018–2020), and then starred in the film adaptation of Lin-Manuel Miranda's In the Heights (2021). She portrayed Sam Carpenter in the slasher films Scream (2022) and Scream VI (2023), which established her as a scream queen. She has also starred in the musical romance Carmen (2022), the vampire comedy Abigail, and the horror romance Your Monster (both 2024).

Her career in the American film industry hit a snag after voicing pro-Palestine stances in 2023. Barrera made her Broadway debut playing Rose DeWitt Bukater in the satirical musical comedy Titanique (2026).

== Early life and education ==
Melissa Barrera Martínez was born on 4 July 1990 in Monterrey, Nuevo León, Mexico to businessman and entrepreneur Tomás Barrera and homemaker Rossana Martínez. She is the oldest of four, her sisters are, Rosanna, Regina and Mayelah. Her hometown was an industrial mountain city located approximately three hours from the United States border. This geographical proximity significantly influenced her upbringing, fostering a bicultural identity. Living in Northern Mexico, she frequently travelled across the border to the US for vacations, dining, and shopping trips, often visiting nearby cities like McAllen, Texas.

During her childhood, she was raised in a Catholic, loud and musical household, and growing up in a matriarchal family, Barrera was influenced by her mother’s emphasis on personal presentation and health. Her early upbringing included a focus on natural wellness, such as the use of aloe vera from the family garden and the consistent application of sunblock as a preventative health measure.

Before pursuing the arts, Barrera was deeply into sports, playing basketball from kindergarten through 12th grade. She recalls being the only girl in a "little gang" of neighborhood boys, spending her summers climbing trees, riding bikes, and playing in the dirt. She attended the American School Foundation of Monterrey, from ages 4 to 18. This environment allowed her to become fluent in English and immersed her in American media, which later influenced her desire to work in Hollywood. After graduating high school at 18, she then studied musical theatre at New York University Tisch School of the Arts.

== Career ==
=== 1994–2017: Rise to prominence ===
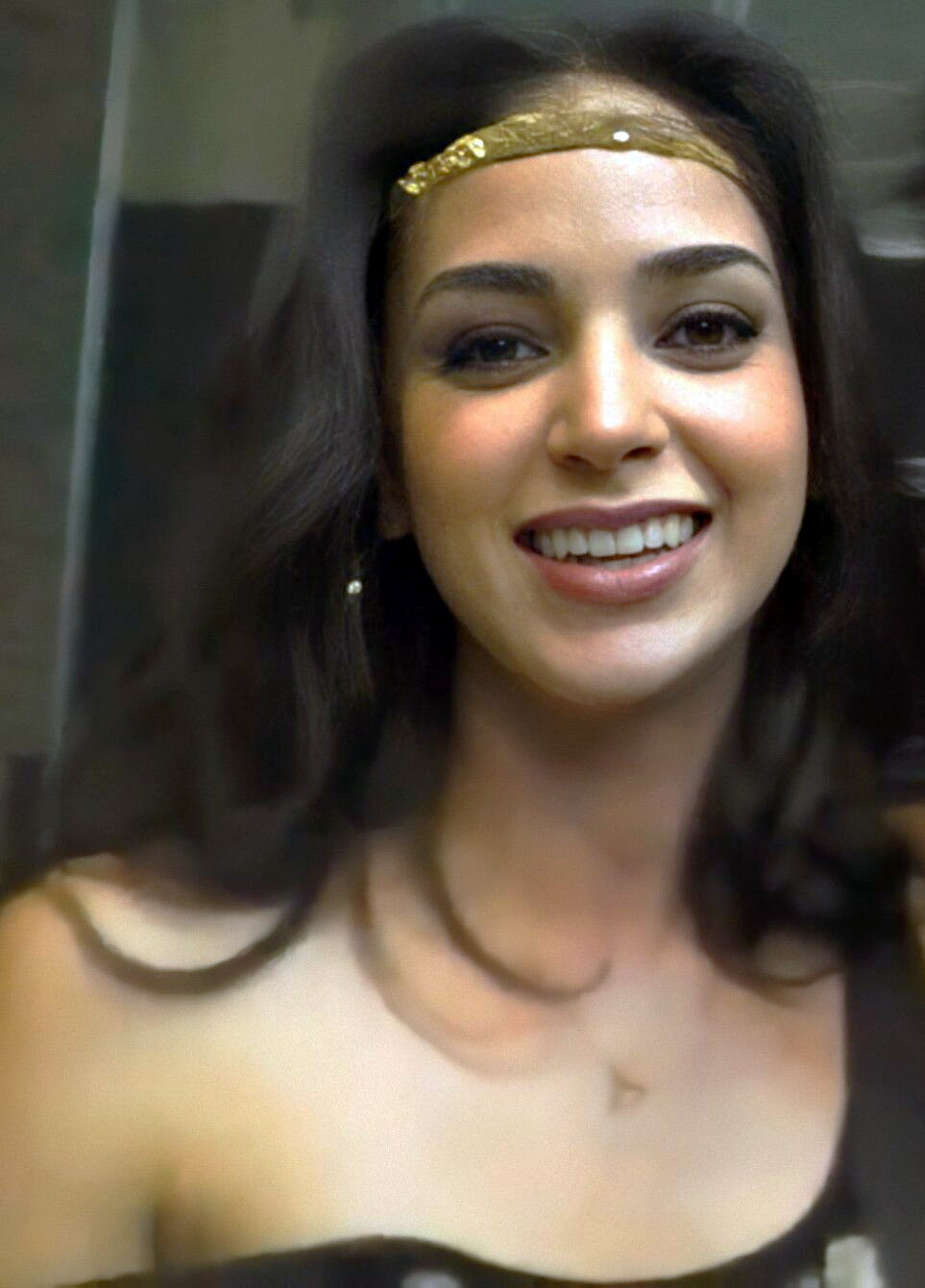
Barrera in 2013

Melissa Barrera's early career in childhood was marked by her passion for theatre and performance. She began her journey in Monterrey, Nuevo León, Mexico, where she discovered her love for the arts at the young age of 4 years old.

In 2004, Barrera starred in school plays and musicals while attending the American School Foundation of Monterrey, such as The Wizard of Oz, Aida, and Romeo and Juliet. Her performance in a stage production of Romeo and Juliet secured her lead role, and she later portrayed Ariel in Footloose. Her early involvement in theatre and musicals laid the foundation for her future success in the entertainment industry. In 2010 she moved from Monterrey to Mexico City.

Her television debut was on the Mexican reality show La Academia in 2011, where she showed off her talent for singing, and earning a multi year deal contract with TV Azteca.

In 2010, while still in college, she starred as Kennedy in the film L for Leisure. In 2012, she had recurring roles in the telenovelas La mujer de Judas and La otra cara del alma. In 2014, she landed her first starring role in the telenovela Siempre tuya Acapulco as Olvido Pérez.

In 2015, she starred in her last telenovela Tanto amor as Mia González, officially ending her contract with TV Azteca, and in 2016, she joined the recurring cast of Imagen Televisión's Perseguidos as Laura Solis. In 2017, she moved to Los Angeles to transition to Hollywood.

=== 2018–2023: Transition to Hollywood ===
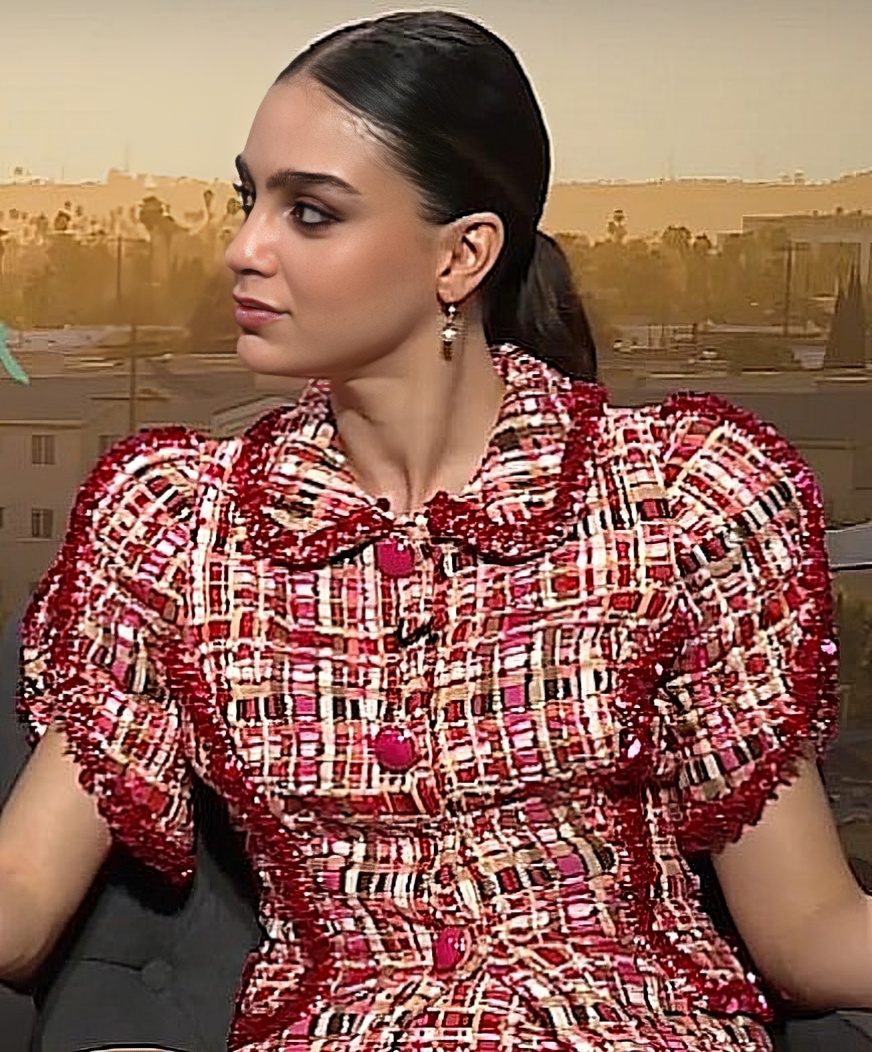
Barrera in 2019

Barrera had her international breakthrough playing Lyn Hernandez in the Starz original comedy drama series Vida (2018–2020). The show ran for three seasons and holds a 100% rating on Rotten Tomatoes. In 2021, In the Heights was released with Barrera co-starring in the Jon M. Chu-directed musical film, an adaptation of Lin-Manuel Miranda's In the Heights. The film earned widespread critical acclaim, with Monica Castillo of The Wrap praising Barrera's performance:

"Vanessa's upbeat [...] anthem, 'It Won't Be Long Now', is perhaps one of the more underrated sequences: It's an impressive showcase for Barrera's talents, giving her a wide range of emotions to move through in one number and one of the few moments in the musical to belt out."

— Monica Castillo, The Wrap,

In 2022, Barrera starred as Sam Carpenter in the fifth Scream film, which was directed by Matt Bettinelli-Olpin and Tyler Gillett. The film was released on 14 January 2022. It was a box-office success that reinvigorated the franchise. She then starred in Keep Breathing, a six episode survival drama released on Netflix on June 28, 2022. That same year, she starred as the title character in Benjamin Millepied's Carmen co-starring Paul Mescal. The film had its world premiere at the 2022 Toronto International Film Festival. She also starred in Bed Rest, quietly released with limited promotion on Tubi in December 2022.

In early 2023, Barrera reprised her role as Sam Carpenter in Scream VI, which scored the highest opening weekend of the franchise.

=== 2024–present: Career expansion ===
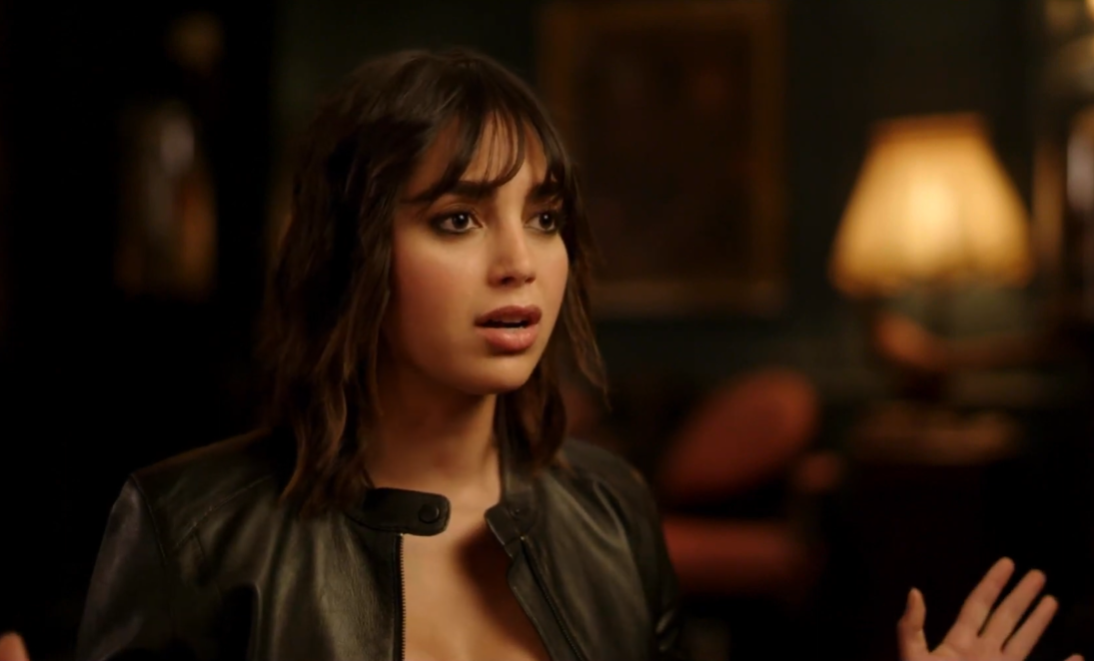
Barrera in an interview for Abigail in 2024

It was announced in 2024 that Barrera teamed up again with the directors of Scream (2022) and Scream VI to star in the vampire horror comedy film Abigail, where she played former army medic Joey. Barrera found success and critical acclaim for her role as Laura Franco in the indie film Your Monster. Barrera's performance in the film was deemed by some critics to be the best performance of her career. The performance led Barrera to receive the Sundance London Audience Award. The film led to Barrera being nominated for Best Actress at the Imagen Awards, and a win at The Latino Entertainment Journalists Association Film Awards.

In October 2024, Barrera was cast alongside Simu Liu in James Wan's Peacock spy thriller The Copenhagen Test. She plays Michelle Cyr, who is a spy and the girlfriend of Simu Liu's character, Alexander Hale. The show aired on 27 December 2025, securing the number one spot on Peacock's streaming platform alongside being in the top 3 of HBO Max's international streaming charts.

For her portrayal as Michelle Cyr in The Copenhagen Test, Jeff Ewing of Collider praised her performance:

"[Melissa Barrera] adeptly handles Michelle's complex emotional landscape and good-natured (but not totally trustworthy) company woman vibes. As a dancer and Scream queen, she's also believable when it comes to the series' big action moments."

— Jeff Ewing, Collider

In October 2025, it was announced that Barrera would co-star alongside John Travolta in Renny Harlin's orca survival film Black Tides. In 2026, it was announced she would make her Broadway debut portraying Rose DeWitt Bukater in the musical Titanique.

== Other ventures ==
=== Musical career ===
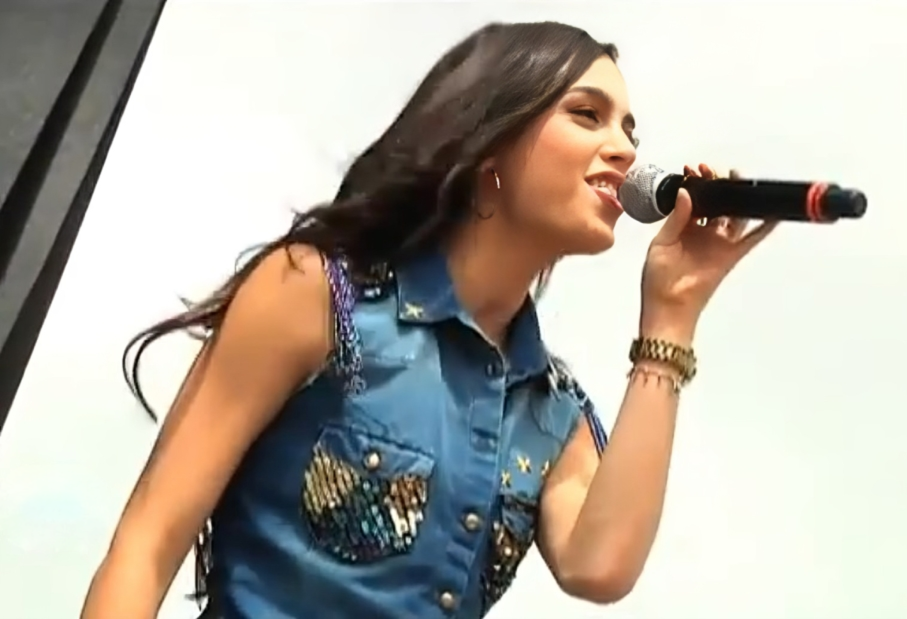
Barrera performing at the Exa Puebla concert in 2013

During her career as a telenovela actress, in 2013, she was part of the duet Melissa y Sebastian with Sebastian Martingaste, with whom she released her first album and had her first top ten radio hit with their debut single "Mamma Maria", which is a cover of Ricchi e Poveri's 1982 song of the same name under the TV Azteca label. In 2015, she released the theme song "Volver a caer" alongside Kalimba for Tanto amor.

In 2020, she joined Gracias Uniwerso, which she released her debut single as a solo artist, ''Stay Home With Me''. The song was born during the quarantine period when Barrera found herself with unexpected time for self-reflection. The lyrics reflect on how lives returned to a different pace "faster than we thought" and offers a message of finding magic and a "second chance" despite the pain and fear of the dark. She shared it on Instagram with the note, "I wrote a song. I hope you like it". Thematically, it captures the feeling of life abruptly shifting from a fast-paced career to a sudden standstill.

In 2021, she released ''Una y Otra Vez'' which features her sisters, Rosanna, Regina and Mayelah. Written by Melissa and Marcela De La Garza, the lyrics focus on the enduring nature of love and choice, with the title translating to "Again and Again" or "Over and Over". Melissa has noted that if she had to choose her life or family again, she would choose them "una y otra vez". It was released shortly before her break-out international film role in In the Heights, marking a moment where she returned to her musical roots in Mexico before her global stardom accelerated. Three months later, she starred in and released her debut soundtrack album In the Heights under Atlantic Records. The same year, she recorded the soundtrack album Carmen, in collaboration with composer Nicholas Britell and singer-songwriter Julieta Venegas, and was released on 21 April 2023 under Sony Masterworks.

On February 2023, she recorded the soundtrack album Your Monster, and a year later, it was released on 25 October 2024 under Vertical.

=== Scream 7 controversy, activism and philanthropy ===
In November 2023, it was reported that Barrera had been dropped from her lead role in the upcoming sequel Scream 7. The firing was a result of social media posts she had made which described Gaza as a "concentration camp" and the Israeli government's actions in the Gaza war as "genocide and ethnic cleansing". In addition, she shared a magazine article from Jewish Currents, penned by Israeli historian and genocide scholar Raz Segal, alleging the Israeli government was distorting “the Holocaust to boost the Israeli arms industry”, which was deemed antisemitic by Spyglass. In late 2023, a Spyglass spokesman told Variety "Spyglass' stance is unequivocally clear: We have zero tolerance for antisemitism or the incitement of hate in any form, including false references to genocide, ethnic cleansing, Holocaust distortion or anything that flagrantly crosses the line into hate speech.” Following her firing, Barrera released a statement which denounced antisemitism and Islamophobia and said criticism of a government should not be conflated with attacks on the people of a country. Barrera described the year following the firing to be a downturn in opportunities to work, and stated:

"For the longest time, I gave myself value as a human because of my work. So when I saw it potentially ending, I was like, who even am I? And I realized that I'm so much more than just an actor – I'm a great sister, a great daughter, a great friend. And I'm very capable of finding success in something else if I wanted it."

— Melissa Barrera, The Independent,

In January 2024, she participated in a protest against the Gaza genocide at the Sundance Film Festival.

She amplified her advocacy by encouraging donations to the United Nations Relief and Works Agency for Palestine Refugees in the Near East (UNRWA), that raised over $60,000 for Palestinian refugees drawing both support and controversy. She also uses her platform to promote Doctors Without Borders and Save the Children, and she is a recurring volunteer at the Central Texas Food Bank, where she helps address local food insecurity. Staff and community members have praised her for being a hands-on volunteer who seeks to help rather than just appear for "photo ops".

In September 2025, Barrera was among more than 5,000 film industry professionals to sign a pledge organised by Film Workers for Palestine. The signatories committed to a boycott of Israeli film and television institutions accused of being "complicit in the occupation" of Palestine. The pledge specifically includes a refusal to collaborate with production companies, film festivals, and distributors that are funded by the Israeli government or that "whitewash" its policies. According to The Hollywood Reporter, the boycott targets state-linked institutions rather than individual Israeli filmmakers.

=== Screenwriting and directing ===
In April 2025, Barrera revealed she had completed the screenplay for a lesbian romantic comedy, which she also intends to direct. She has expressed a desire to move beyond her established "scream queen" reputation to focus on original content and indie cinema. Her expanding role behind the camera includes serving as an executive producer with John Leguizamo on the documentary Traces of Home (2025).

=== Endorsements ===
In June 2021, Barrera was named the first Latina Global Ambassador for the cosmetics company Clinique. She has also participated in campaigns for skincare brand Kiehl's. In addition to her role with Clinique Barrera has established a consistent presence in high fashion through recurring collaborations with several luxury houses. She has been frequently styled in Versace, notably wearing the brand for the 2023 CinemaCon Big Screen Achievement Awards and during her press tour for Scream VI. Additionally, she has a long-standing relationship with the luxury footwear brand Aquazzura, which has provided custom footwear for her international film premieres, including the 2023 Scream VI tour. Her fashion choices are often documented by industry outlets such as Red Carpet Fashion Awards, which track her transition toward high-luxury labels for her public appearances. Barrera has maintained a long-standing relationship with the luxury fashion house Chanel, frequently appearing as a guest at the brand's fashion shows and events. In late 2025, Barrera significantly expanded her fashion portfolio by becoming a central figure for the Italian luxury house Roberto Cavalli. She was selected as the face of the brand's Fall/Winter 2025-26 campaign, appearing in global advertisements and digital content. Her partnership with the house was further highlighted during the press tour for The Copenhagen Test, where she was exclusively dressed by the brand for the New York City premiere. Industry analysts have noted that her association with Cavalli aligns with her transition from "scream queen" to a high-fashion red carpet fixture.

Barrera has maintained a long-standing partnership with Armani Beauty, serving as a frequent brand partner for their global cosmetics campaigns. She has prominently featured in promotions for the brand’s signature products, including the Luminous Silk Foundation and Eye Tint lines. In December 2024, she detailed her extensive history with the brand in a profile for Into The Gloss, noting that Armani has been her primary beauty collaborator for her international film press tours and festival appearances, including the Sundance Film Festival, and a long-standing association with NARS Cosmetics, often featuring the brand's products as staples in her professional and personal beauty routines.

== Personal life ==
=== Relationships and family ===
Barrera met musical artist Francisco Xavier Zazueta on the set of La Academia in 2011, and performed a rendition of Enrique Iglesias' "Cuando Me Enamoro" for its fourth episode. They began dating in September that year, and announced their engagement via Instagram in June 2017. Barrera and Zazueta married in February 2019.

=== Religion ===
She was raised in a Catholic, matriarchal household in Monterrey, Mexico. She has noted that her upbringing and personal belief in spirits influence her professional choices, specifically leading her to avoid horror projects involving occult or satanic themes. In an interview with Dazed, she explained her refusal to appear in "demonic possession" films, stating that her Catholic background instilled a respect and fear for such subject matter and a desire not to "open doors and portals" to the supernatural, and that her upbringing initially influenced her to feel a sense of shame or embarrassment regarding certain aspects of her womanhood and professional risks, but she eventually chose to prioritise her personal and artistic growth over those traditional judgements.

Her faith continues to inform her personal values; she has described having a strong "moral compass" rooted in her upbringing and has publicly stated that she prays "day and night" for peace and an end to violence during times of global conflict.

== Acting credits ==
Melissa Barrera's professional trajectory is defined by a transition from the Mexican television industry to leading roles in Hollywood genre cinema. After studying at NYU’s Tisch School of the Arts, she returned to Mexico and competed in the 2011 musical reality show La Academia. This led to her early television work in the Mexican market, where she portrayed Zulamita Sanchez in La mujer de Judas (2012) and Mariana Durán in La otra cara del alma (2012). Her profile increased significantly after she was cast in leading roles for two major telenovelas: portraying Olvido Pérez in Siempre tuya Acapulco (2014) and Mia González in Tanto amor (2015).

Barrera’s transition to the United States began with a recurring role in the Netflix series Club de Cuervos (2017) as Isabel Cantú, followed by her break-out lead role as Lyn Hernandez in the Starz series Vida (2018–2020). In 2021, she gained international recognition starring as Vanessa Morales in the film adaptation of In the Heights (2021), a role that utilized her musical theatre background. Shortly thereafter, she became a central figure in the horror genre by portraying Sam Carpenter in Scream (2022) and Scream VI (2023).

Between 2022 and 2024, Barrera shifted focus toward physically demanding and psychological leads. She starred as Liv in the Netflix survival miniseries Keep Breathing (2022), which required extensive underwater and wilderness stunt work. She followed this with the title role in the modern-day operatic film Carmen (2022), playing Carmen alongside Paul Mescal. In 2024, she led two elevated horror projects: portraying Laura Franco in the horror-romance Your Monster and starring as Joey in the vampire-thriller Abigail (both 2024).

As of early 2026, Barrera has moved into the survival and Western genres with several unreleased projects. She stars as Rebecca Pierce in the orca-attack thriller Black Tides and takes on the lead role of a young widow in the upcoming Western In the Cradle of Granite. Additionally, she portrayed Michelle Cyr in the Peacock series The Copenhagen Test (2025). Throughout her career, Barrera has been noted for performing her own stunts.

=== Filmography ===
Key
†	Denotes films that have not yet been released

==== Film ====
Year	Title	Role	Notes	Ref.
2010	L for Leisure	Kennedy		
2016	The Hotel	Karina		
2016	Beginner's Manual To Be President	Brisa Carreiro		
2018	Shake Off Your Sorrows	Luisa Martin Del Campo		
2018	Twice You	Daniela Cohen		
2021	In the Heights	Vanessa Morales		
2021	All the World Is Sleeping	Chama Valentina		
2021	Making Mallinache: A Documentary by Nacho Cano	Malinalli Tenepal	Documentary film	
2022	Scream	Samantha "Sam" Carpenter		
2022	Carmen	Carmen		
2022	Bed Rest	Julie Rivers	Also producer	
2023	Scream VI	Samantha "Sam" Carpenter		
2024	Your Monster	Laura Franco	Also producer	
2024	Abigail	Ana Lucia ''Joey'' Cruz		
TBA	In The Cradle of Granite †	TBA	Pre-production	
TBA	The One †	Taylor	Pre-production	
TBA	The Collaboration †	Maya	Post-production	
TBA	Black Tides †	Rebecca Pierce	Post-production	
TBA	Inhabit †	TBA	In development	

==== Television ====
Year	Title	Role	Notes	Ref.
2011	La Academia	Herself	Contestant; 14 episodes	
2012	La mujer de Judas	Zulema ''Zulamita'' Sanchez	Recurring role; 3 episodes	
2012–2013	La otra cara del alma	Mariana Durán	Recurring role; 6 episodes	
2014	Siempre tuya Acapulco	Olvido Pérez	Main role	
2015	Tanto amor	Mía González	Main role	
2016–2017	Perseguidos	Laura Solis	Recurring role; 11 episodes	
2017	Club de Cuervos	Isabel Cantú	Main role; (season 3)	
2018–2020	Vida	Lynda "Lyn" Hernandez	Main role	
2020	Acting for a Cause	Elizabeth Bennet	Episode: "Pride and Prejudice"	
2022	Keep Breathing	Olivia "Liv" Rivera	Main role	
2025	The Copenhagen Test	Michelle Cyr	Main role	

==== Music videos ====
Year	Title	Artist
2019	''Melissa''	Xavier Zazueta
2021	''Say Less''	Anthony Ramos

==== Stage ====
Year	Title	Role	Venue	Notes
2004	The Wizard of Oz	Tree #3	American School Foundation of Monterrey	School productions
2005	Grease	Betty Rizzo	American School Foundation of Monterrey	School productions
2006	Aida	Amneris, the Princess of Egypt	American School Foundation of Monterrey	School productions
2007	Romeo and Juliet	Juliet Capulet	Teatro de la Ciudad	Professional stage debut
2008	Footloose	Ariel Moore	Teatro de la Ciudad	
2010	Sweet Charity	Charity Hope Valentine	New York University Tisch School of the Arts, Collaborative Arts Project 21, Off-Broadway	Off-Broadway debut
2010	The Caucasian Chalk Circle	Grusche Vachnadze	New York University Tisch School of the Arts, Collaborative Arts Project 21, Off-Broadway	
2013	Spring Awakening	Wendla Bergman	Teatro de la Ciudad	
2015	Hoy no me puedo levantar	María	Teatro Aldama	
2016	Young Frankenstein	Inga Frankenstein	Teatro Aldama	
2026	Titanique	Rose DeWitt Bukater	St. James Theatre, Broadway	Broadway debut

== Discography ==
=== Studio albums ===
- Melissa & Sebastian (2013)

=== Soundtrack albums ===
- In the Heights (2021)
- Carmen (2022)
- Your Monster (2024)

== Awards and nominations ==
Melissa Barrera has received several accolades for her work in film, television, and theatre across Mexico and the United States. After establishing her career in Mexican telenovelas and musical theatre, she gained international recognition for her leading role in the 2021 film In the Heights, which earned her a Satellite Award nomination. Her subsequent work in the Scream franchise and independent films like Your Monster has resulted in further honors, such as multiple Imagen Award nominations.
