= Vivo (soundtrack) =

2021 soundtrack album by Lin-Manuel Miranda, Alex Lacamoire and various artists

Vivo (Original Motion Picture Soundtrack)

Soundtrack album by Lin-Manuel Miranda, Alex Lacamoire and various artists
- Released: August 6, 2021
- Genre: Film soundtrack
- Length: 41:23
- Label: Atlantic
- Producer: Lin-Manuel Miranda; Alex Lacamoire

Lin-Manuel Miranda chronology
In the Heights (2021)	Vivo (2021)	Encanto (2021)

Alex Lacamoire chronology
In the Heights (2021)	Vivo (2021)

Vivo (Original Motion Picture Score)

Film score by Alex Lacamoire
- Released: August 20, 2021
- Studio: Synchron Stage Vienna
- Genre: Film score
- Length: 29:22
- Label: Atlantic
- Producer: Alex Lacamoire

Vivo (Original Motion Picture Soundtrack) is the soundtrack to the 2021 film of the same name. The soundtrack consisted of eleven songs (with reprise versions of two of the tracks) written and co-composed by Lin-Manuel Miranda and performed by the film's cast, with twelve instrumental tracks from the film's score composed by Alex Lacamoire, Miranda's longtime collaborator. The soundtrack was led by the single "Keep The Beat" released on July 22, 2021, and the album in its entirety was released on August 6, 2021 through Atlantic Records, coinciding with the film's release through Netflix. A separate album for Lacamoire's score was released on August 20.

== Background ==
Miranda envisioned the project in 2010, when the film was under production at DreamWorks Animation first before opting out due to DreamWorks' corporate restructuring and eventually taken over by Sony Pictures Animation in December 2016. He described it a "love letter to Cuban musical heritage" and was a kindred spirit to In the Heights. Miranda recruited his longtime collaborator in his Broadway musical productions, composer Alex Lacamoire, to compose music for the film, and he wrote 11 original songs for the film. The film's director, Kirk DeMicco, whom was fascinated by the script and musical ideas, had worked with Cuban experts to recreate the sound of Havana authentically, which led to their collaboration with Cuban bandleader Juan de Marcos González who starred as Andrés, Vivo's owner and sang two of the tracks.

Lacamoire felt that Vivo was extremely special for him as the music delves into his roots as a Cuban American, which informed how his music really helped for the film. He felt that animation worked around the music in the best possible way, where his involvement was brought much earlier, that he would make demos or suggest arrangement ideas which would become part of the story, and felt color grading was important for the directors and production designers, who were very conscious. However, crediting Miranda, he thought that he inspired the colors and went along with the story.

Since the film was finished during the COVID-19 pandemic, they had recorded only 20 percent of the vocals for the film before the pandemic. While the remainder was completed remotely or at studios abiding to COVID-19 regulations, where Lacamoire felt that the process happened in "bits and pieces". While some tracks were written way before 2019, most of them were not written or recorded when the pandemic hit. For recording the finale, the team found tricky as they had to record vocals of each characters separately, and the song had numerous voices, which included a lot of people, taking a lot of time to happen. He felt that, it sounds "joyous, fun and a big rousing closing number for a musical".

== Track listing ==
Vivo (Original Motion Picture Soundtrack)
No.	Title	Performer(s)	Length
1.	"Overture" (score)	Alex Lacamoire	1:12
2.	"One Of A Kind"	Juan de Marcos González; Lin-Manuel Miranda	4:10
3.	"Mambo Cabana"	de Marcos González; Miranda; Gloria Estefan	2:17
4.	"One More Song"	Miranda	2:32
5.	"My Own Drum"	Ynairaly Simo	2:22
6.	"Keep The Beat"	Miranda; Simo	2:33
7.	"Love's Gonna Pick You Up"	Brian Tyree Henry; Miranda; Aneesa Folds	1:30
8.	"Tough Crowd"	Miranda	0:28
9.	"One More Song (Reprise)"	Miranda	0:39
10.	"Running Out Of Time"	Miranda; Simo; Christopher Jackson; Veronica Jackson; Gloria Calderon Kellett; Bri Holland; Alana de Fonseca; Jada Banks-Mace; Estefan; Zoe Saldaña	2:14
11.	"Inside Your Heart"	Estefan	2:41
12.	"Grand Finale"	Simo; Miranda; Tyree Henry; Folds; Holland; de Fonseca; Banks-Mace; Saldaña; Estefan	2:06
13.	"My Own Drum (Reprise)" (with Missy Elliott)	Simo	2:57
14.	"¡Presente!"	Estefan	2:23
15.	"Marta's Letters" (score)	Lacamoire	0:44
16.	"La Colecta/Suitcase Of Memories" (score)	Lacamoire	1:20
17.	"Vivo Comes Around" (score)	Lacamoire; Miranda	0:48
18.	"Saving The Song" (score)	Lacamoire; Miranda	1:26
19.	"Welcome To Florida" (score)	Lacamoire; Miranda	0:27
20.	"Sand Dollar Animal Control" (score)	Lacamoire	1:33
21.	"Not On My Watch" (score)	Lacamoire	0:39
22.	"Lutador" (score)	Lacamoire	0:52
23.	"Gabi And Vivo" (score)	Lacamoire	0:53
24.	"Bienvenido A La Familia" (score)	Lacamoire; Miranda	1:37
25.	"What Difference Can A Song Make?" (score)	Lacamoire; Miranda	0:59
Total length:			41:35

Vivo (Original Motion Picture Score)
No.	Title	Length
1.	"Overture"	1:25
2.	"Marta's Letter"	0:44
3.	"La Colecta/Suitcase Of Memories"	1:19
4.	"I Wanted To Tell Her.."	0:28
5.	"...And I Said Nothing"	0:44
6.	"Vivo Comes Around"	0:48
7.	"Saving The Song"	1:19
8.	"For An Old Friend"	0:28
9.	"90 Miles Away"	0:30
10.	"Key West?"	0:24
11.	"Welcome to Florida"	0:27
12.	"Tío Wrote Her a Song"	0:57
13.	"A.K.A. The Honey Bear"	1:25
14.	"Sand Dollar Animal Control"	1:33
15.	"Raging Waters"	0:49
16.	"Not On My Watch"	0:39
17.	"Soulmates"	0:55
18.	"Soulmates (Reprise)"	0:56
19.	"Be Quiet!"	1:59
20.	"Snaaake!!!"	1:22
21.	"Lutador"	0:52
22.	"Saved the Day, But.."	1:21
23.	"Transcribing the Song"	2:05
24.	"Para Marta"	2:24
25.	"Bienvenido A La Familia"	1:37
26.	"Gabi And Vivo"	0:53
27.	"What Difference Can One Song Make?"	0:59
Total length:		29:22

== Reception ==
Calling the music as "stellar" and "dynamite", Maya Phillips of The New York Times wrote "Miranda's songs incorporate his signature rapid-fire rapping, along with quick tempo changes and genre mash-ups." Petrana Radulovic of Polygon wrote "Miranda's songwriting skills are still stellar, but the best part of Vivo happens when the music and animation work in tandem to elevate the story, playing with the visual style to highlight the music, so it all meshes together in a beautiful symphony." Brian Lowry of CNN wrote "the songs – featuring the composer's trademark mix of musical styles and playful lyrical calisthenics – prove catchy and touching". Amy Amatangelo of Paste called the songs "are equally delightful, if a little predictable. They are very, shall we say, on-brand for Miranda. His brand is a good one, but many tunes here sound repetitive."

Michael Ordoña of Los Angeles Times summarised "While there's nothing in the score to make fans forget Hamilton, there are a few songs with the uplifting gusto the composer brought to" highlighting "One of a Kind" and "Love's Gonna Pick You Up". He cited "My Own Drum" as the standout song and "Inside Your Heart (Para Marta)" building the entire story. Peter Debruge of Variety wrote "the songs build on one another, hooking in your head and snowballing as the movie develops." Darren Franich of Entertainment Weekly said that all the tunes in are "original Miranda compositions" and further commented "With the other songs, you feel the mind behind In the Heights and Hamilton working hard to integrate the legacy of Cuban music."

== Charts ==
Chart (2021)	Peak position
UK Album Downloads (OCC)	41
UK Soundtrack Albums (OCC)	16
US Top Soundtracks (Billboard)	7

== Accolades ==
Award	Date of ceremony	Category	Nominee(s)	Result	Ref.
Hollywood Music in Media Awards	November 17, 2021	Original Score — Animated Film	Alex Lacamoire	Nominated	
Annie Awards	March 12, 2022	Best Music in a Feature Production	Alex Lacamoire, Lin-Manuel Miranda	Nominated	
