= Carmen (soundtrack) =

Carmen (Original Motion Picture Soundtrack)

Soundtrack album by Nicholas Britell
- Released: April 21, 2023
- Recorded: 2015–2022
- Genres: Film score; orchestral; classical
- Length: 70:08
- Label: Sony Masterworks
- Producer: Nicholas Britell

Nicholas Britell chronology
She Said (2022)	Carmen (2023)

Carmen (Original Motion Picture Soundtrack) is the soundtrack to the 2022 film of the same name directed by Benjamin Millepied. It consisted of 30 tracks from the original music composed by Nicholas Britell, who co-wrote the original songs with Taura Stinson, Julieta Venegas, and The D.O.C. while also having songs performed by the actors Paul Mescal and Melissa Barrera. Sony Masterworks released the soundtrack on April 21, 2023.

== Background ==
Nicholas Britell was recruited to score music for the film during the announcement in May 2017. The original score he composed for the film took an experimental approach that threads the song and movement into the narrative framework and the direction Millepied took as he incorporated touches from his earlier childhood in Senegal and motifs from East European and West African music to give a multicultural feel. Britell also wrote original songs for the film, along with contributing co-writers: Grammy Award-winning Mexican singer-songwriter Julieta Venegas, Taura Stinson, and The D.O.C. The film score melded in the mood of the characters and the roots of the story, as from having a classical nature, he elevated the sonic aggressiveness using synthesisers, audio experiments, and string orchestra.

When he watched the sequence featuring Aidan (Paul Mescal) and Carmen (Melissa Barrera), who have grown closer since fleeing Mexico, hid in a nightclub that belongs to her dead mother's best friend, Masilda (Rossy de Palma), Britell recalled that he said to Millepied on using a choir in the score singing when the duo are in a motel, which felt it as crazy. As Millepied gave him more freedom to experiment, Britell used a choir that served as a kind of Greek chorus and selected lyrics from Henri Meilhac and Ludovic Halévy's original libretto to Bizet's opera on which the film is based. The choir singing French lyrics provided a bridge from the staging of the opera to Millepied's screen adaptation. In some instances, Britell uses the female choir as "the heart of the score" while the male choir has been used to provide a "darker setting".

While scoring for Carmen, Millepied did not give temp tracks for the film. Britell recalled that he liked the way Bernard Herrmann's score in Vertigo (1958) is a part of the film, adding, "I think that was the kind of thing that he was saying, in the sense of it was more about the concept of a score like that, as opposed to the music itself. That's obviously very helpful in that way."

Britell worked on the filmed music on camera for over five years, beginning from 2015 to 2020. A behind-the-scenes video of the film's music was released in late April 2023.

== Track listing ==
No.	Title	Artist(s)	Length
1.	"Overture – La Vie Errante"		2:51
2.	"L'Oiseau s'envole"		3:25
3.	"Aidan – L'Amour est loin"		1:08
4.	"Slip Away"	Paul Mescal	1:49
5.	"At the Mine – Il est là!"		1:32
6.	"Lullaby"		1:44
7.	"Attack – Si tu m'aimais, tu me suivrais"		5:31
8.	"Investigation – Regardons passer les gens"		1:13
9.	"The Motel – Je veux dire ton nom"		2:11
10.	"On the Run – Songe bien"		2:57
11.	"Oasis – Quand je vous aimerai"		1:38
12.	"Réponds-nous"	Nicholas Britell and Tim Fain	2:59
13.	"After the Dance – Le Ciel Même"		1:46
14.	"To Los Angeles"		1:31
15.	"Arrival – Ta Promesse"		2:00
16.	"Ven a Mí"	Nicholas Britell, Rossy de Palma and Tim Fain	3:56
17.	"Pour pays l'univers"		1:09
18.	"Calling Home – Le Destin"		2:27
19.	"Rooftops"		2:53
20.	"Masilda and Carmen"		1:59
21.	"The Beach – Tout Mon Etre"		1:50
22.	"Tú y Yo"		1:48
23.	"Cello Impromptu in F Minor"	Nicholas Britell and Caitlin Sullivan	1:35
24.	"Waltz Tango"	Nicholas Britell and Tim Fain	2:05
25.	"Jamais Carmen ne cèdera"		3:00
26.	"Je l'aime"		1:12
27.	"The Police – C'est l'Espada"		3:53
28.	"Lullaby / Beyond – Vive La Musique"	Nicholas Britell, Melissa Barrera and Paul Mescal	2:45
29.	"Rebelle (Bonus Track)"		1:43
30.	"Pelea"	The D.O.C.	3:38
Total length:			70:08

== Reception ==
Joshua Barone of The New York Times wrote, "No dialogue, anyway, communicates more effectively than [Nicholas] Britell's soundtrack, a constant presence, tense and evocative, functioning like opera by fully integrating with, if not driving, the story rather than underscoring it." Nell Minow of RogerEbert.com wrote, "The dance numbers are pulsatingly, pulse-poundingly erotic, and gorgeously performed and filmed. Nicholas Britell's score has touches of an angelic choir that sometimes seems to be commenting on the story like a Greek chorus, carrying the characters forward, caressing them, or sounding an alarm." Carlos Aguilar of the Los Angeles Times commented, "Paying homage to the original opera with a vigorous choir, the score by celebrated composer Nicholas Britell rings as grand and eerie as the open landscapes in the couple's journey." ScreenRant writer Ferdosa complimented Britell's score as "emotive and impactful".

Ann Hornaday of The Washington Post commented, "Although there are sonic glimpses of Britell's signature ostinato here, they're too often drowned out by choirs that are meant to be heavenly but just sound pretentious and grandiose." David Ehrlich of IndieWire complimented the film's review, saying, "Nicholas Britell goes absolutely wild in Benjamin Millepied's delirious fever dream version of his favorite childhood opera." "Composer Nicholas Britell has room to run riot as, in a sense, the dominant voice of the film: Mixing a thundering orchestra with more eerily modern sonic details and shrieking choral arrangements, his heavily amplified soundtrack drives the action as Bizet's score did, matching or even aggravating the volume and tempo of the onscreen melodrama"
