= List of awards and nominations received by Melissa Barrera =

Melissa Barrera awards and nominations
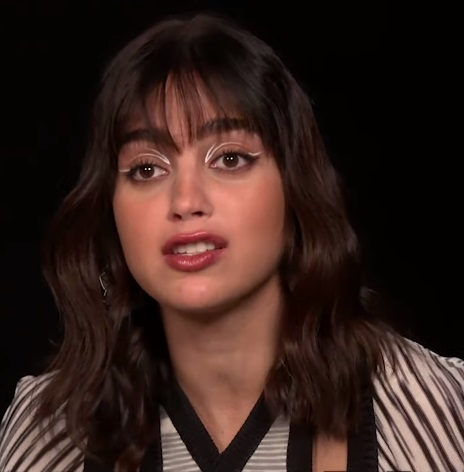
- Barrera in 2023
Awards and nominations
Award	Wins	Nominations
Satellite Awards	0	1
Imagen Awards	0	4

Totals (Note: Certain award groups do not simply award one winner. They acknowledge several different recipients, have runners-up, and have third place. Since this is a specific recognition and is different from losing an award, runner-up mentions are considered wins in this award tally. For simplification and to avoid errors, each award in this list has been presumed to have had a prior nomination.)
- Wins: 10
- Nominations: 26

Melissa Barrera as a Mexican actress and singer has received various accolades for her work in film, television, and musical theatre. After rising to prominence in Mexican telenovelas, she gained international recognition for her starring role in the musical drama In the Heights (2021) and the Scream franchise, which she received a Satellite Award for Best Actress in a Motion Picture nomination in 2022, and a Golden Scythe Horror Award for Best Actress in a Leading Role in 2023.

For her performance in the horror-romance as Laura Franco in Your Monster (2024), she won the Audience Award at the Sundance Film Festival and a Sin Fronteras Award at the Los Cabos International Film Festival in 2024, and received a nomination for Best Actress at the Imagen Awards in 2025. For playing Lyn Hernandez in Vida (2018-2020), she was nominated for Best Actress at the Imagen Awards in 2021, and received another Imagen Award for Best Actress nomination for Keep Breathing in 2023.

== Major associations ==
=== Satellite Awards ===
Year	Nominated work	Category	Result	Ref.
2022	In the Heights	Best Actress in a Motion Picture	Nominated	

=== Imagen Awards ===
Year	Nominated work	Category	Result	Ref.
2021	Vida	Best Actress – Television (Comedy)	Nominated	
2023	Keep Breathing	Best Actress – Television (Drama)	Nominated	
2025	Your Monster	Best Actress	Nominated	
2026	The Copenhagen Test	Best Actress – Drama (Television)	Pending	

== Miscellaneous awards ==
Organizations	Year	Category	Work	Result	Ref.
Agrupación de Periodistas Teatrales	2015	Revelation in Theatre	Hoy no me puedo levantar	Won	
Agrupación de Críticos y Periodistas de Teatro	2015	Female Revelation in a Musical	Hoy no me puedo levantar	Won	
National Hispanic Media Coalition Impact Awards	2019	Outstanding Television Series	Vida	Won	
49th Annual Nosotros Golden Eagle Awards	2019	Breakout Artist	Herself	Won	
Queerty Awards	2020	Next Big Thing	Herself	Nominated	
Hollywood Critics Association	2021	Best Actress	In the Heights	Nominated	
Women Film Critics Circle Awards	2021	Best Screen Couple (shared with Anthony Ramos)	In the Heights	Nominated	
Hollywood Music in Media Awards	2021	Best Onscreen Performance (shared with Anthony Ramos, Corey Hawkins, Gregory Diaz IV, Noah Catala, Daphne Rubin-Vega, Stephanie Beatriz, and Dascha Polanco)	In the Heights	Nominated	
IMDb STARmeter Awards	2022	Fan Favorite	Herself	Won	
Golden Scythe Horror Awards	2023	Best Actress in a Leading Role	Scream VI	Nominated	
Sun Valley Film Festival	2024	Best Narrative in a Feature Film	Your Monster	Nominated	
Sun Valley Film Festival	2024	Best Performance in a Feature Film	Your Monster	Honored	
Sundance Film Festival	2024	Audience Award	Your Monster	Won	
Los Cabos International Film Festival	2024	Sin Fronteras Award	Your Monster	Won	
Lower East Side Film Festival	2024	The Best of The Festival	Your Monster	Won	
Brussels International Film Festival	2024	International Competition	Your Monster	Runner-up (Note: Shared with Cuckoo.)	
Charlotte Film Festival	2024	Audience Favorite Award	Your Monster	Won	
Latino Entertainment Journalists Association Film Awards	2025	Best Actress	Your Monster	Nominated	
Broadway.com Audience Choice Awards	2026	Favorite Featured Actress in a Musical	Titanique	Nominated	
Broadway.com Audience Choice Awards	2026	Favorite Breakthrough Performance (Female)	Titanique	Nominated	
Dorian Awards	2026	Outstanding Featured Performance in a Broadway Musical	Titanique	Nominated	
