= Siempre tuya Acapulco =

2014 Mexican telenovela

- Genre: Telenovela
- Created by: Alberto Gómez
- Written by: Leonardo Abreu
- Directed by: Carlos Ángel Guerra; Eduardo Ripari
- Creative director: Marisa Pecanins
- Starring: Daniel Elbittar; Melissa Barrera; Rafael Sánchez Navarro; Cecilia Ponce; Aura Cristina Geithner; Gabriela Roel; Wendy de los Cobos; Alberto Guerra; Héctor Soberón; Bernie Paz
- Theme music composer: José Miguel Velásquez
- Opening theme: "Quiero decirte" by Daniel Elbittar
- Country of origin: Mexico
- Original language: Spanish
- No. of episodes: 136

Production
- Executive producer: Rita Fusaro
- Producers: Marcela de la Barrera; Miguel Ángel López; Elisa Salinas; Pedro Lira
- Production locations: Acapulco, Mexico
- Cinematography: Ernesto García Sandoval; Alfonso Pérez
- Editors: Juan Carlos Galindo; Alejandra Espinoza
- Camera setup: Multi-camera
- Production company: Azteca

Original release
- Network: Trece
- Release: 10 February – 17 August 2014

Related
- Prohibido amar; Las Bravo

Siempre Tuya Acapulco (literally Forever Yours Acapulco) (English title A Love To Remember) is a Mexican telenovela produced by Azteca in 2014.

Starring Melissa Barrera and Daniel Elbittar as the protagonists of the story, with Cecilia Ponce, Aura Cristina Geithner, Gabriela Roel, Wendy de los Cobos, Ramiro Tomasini and Bernie Paz star as the antagonists.

On 10 February 2014 Siempre Tuya Acapulco debuted on Azteca Trece at 8:30pm, replacing Prohibido Amar. The last episode was broadcast on 17 August 2014, with Las Bravo replacing it the following week.

== Plot ==
Olvido Pérez is a humble and noble young woman who lives in a small house with her grandfather, her cousins Martita and Chuy and her aunt Eufrasia. Her life changes when she goes to help the successful architect Diego Rivas Santander after the plane he was traveling in crashed. Diego loses his memory and over time falls in love with his caretaker.

Meanwhile, Diego's fiancée, Irán Hernández, decides to cancel their wedding and at the same time the family leaves him for dead. An accident in Olvido's small house makes Diego recover his memory and he decides to return to Iran, but finds that he has already married his brother, Rodrigo Rivas. Olvido, heartbroken, decides to go after Diego in the hope of winning back his love.

== Cast ==
Actor	Character
Melissa Barrera	Olvido (Balmaceda) Pérez... Main Heroine
Daniel Elbittar	Diego "David" Rivas Santander... Main Hero
Rafael Sánchez Navarro	Armando Balmaceda Domínguez
Cecilia Ludmila Ponce	Irán Hernández Molina
Aura Cristina Geithner	Angustias de Hernández
Gabriela Roel	Eufrasia Pérez
Wendy de los Cobos	Raquela Romero Balmaceda
Alberto Guerra	David Balmaceda Bustamante
Héctor Soberón	Ulises Santander
Leticia Huijara	Esperanza Santander
Amaranta Ruiz	Rufina
Gina Morett	Licha
Erick Chapa	Rodrigo Rivas-Santander
Francisco Angelini	Pancho
Esmeralda Ugalde	Vanessa Hernández Molina
Carlos Millet	Lucho
Alejandra Ley	Citlalli Chimalpopca Hernández
Gerardo González	Bernardo
Gabriela Spanic	Fernanda Montenegro
Yanilen Díaz	Martha "Martita" Pérez
Estrella Veloz	Rosario "Chayo" Cárdenas
Raúl Sandoval	Tacho Cárdenas
Luciano Zacharski	Jesús "Chuy" Pérez
Ramiro Tomasini	Nelson Hernández
Gregory Kauffmann	Gabriel
Marliese Edelmann	Roxana de Balmaceda Iriarte
Jorge Galvan	Padre Filemon
Carlos Alfonso Bravo	Amador
Mayte Gil	Gisela
Rodrigo Cachero	Dr. Villanueva
José González Marquez	Don Juventino Pérez
Ana La Salvia	Verónica Canciano
Bernie Paz	Stefano Canciano
Regina Torné	Soraya Patiño
Mariana Castillo	Silvia Hernandez Molina

== Awards and nominations ==
=== TV Addict Golden Awards 2014 ===
Category	Nominated	Result
Male revelation	Daniel Elbittar	Winner
Best locations	Rita Fusaro	Winner

== Remake ==
- Siempre tuya Acapulco was remade as Memori Cinta Suraya in Malaysia by Global Station Sdn Bhd which last episode premieres 23 February 2016.
