= Bed Rest (film) =

2022 American film by Lori Evans Taylor

- Middle East theatrical release poster
- Directed by: Lori Evans Taylor
- Written by: Lori Evans Taylor
- Produced by: James Vanderbilt; William Sherak; Paul Neinstein; Lori Evans Taylor; Melissa Barrera
- Starring: Melissa Barrera; Guy Burnet
- Cinematography: Jean-Philippe Bernier
- Edited by: Liz Calandrello
- Music by: Chris Forsgren
- Production companies: STXfilms; Project X Entertainment
- Distributed by: Tubi (United States); STXinternational (International)
- Release date: December 7, 2022
- Running time: 90 minutes
- Country: United States
- Language: English

Bed Rest is a 2022 American supernatural horror film written and directed by Lori Evans Taylor. It stars Melissa Barrera and Guy Burnet.

The film was released on Tubi on December 7, 2022. It is the first film to be produced by STXfilms under The Najafi Companies after STX Entertainment separated from ErosSTX.

== Plot ==
A university professor, Daniel Rivers, and his wife Julie are an expectant couple who are moving into an old but fancy lakeside house in upstate New York. One of the workers the Rivers hired to remodel the house hands Julie an old bracelet he found while doing maintenance work. Julie chooses to keep the bracelet despite it not being hers. Daniel is exhausted from managing the house renovation, but he is happy in his marriage as is Julie, who is seven months pregnant and due to give birth in two months.

That night Julie puts the bracelet she received on her wrist. She then picks up a box she brought with her but puts it down when she hears a child whispering down the hall. Lou, her cat, appears to hear it too. When she goes to investigate, she's startled by Daniel, who brings her into the nursery and excitedly shows her the crib and baby monitor in the corner, which can record video, and is connected to a microphone.

Later that night, the couple attend an Academia Banquet where Julie is asked if she is pregnant with her first child. Daniel cuts in with a yes before Julie can answer. When Julie and Daniel return home, they get into an argument. As it turns out, several years prior, they were expecting a son, but he was tragically stillborn. Julie is upset with Daniel for not being honest about the loss of their son, and while heading upstairs, she is startled at the sight of a little boy, resulting in a nasty fall. Julie awakens in the hospital and doctor seeing the couple, Dr. Meadows, reveals Julie and the baby are both fine. As a precautionary measure, Dr. Meadows places Julie on mandatory bed rest for the remainder of her pregnancy.

On her first day of bed rest, with 55 days remaining until the due date, Julie hears a child laughing and a baby crying, so she goes to investigate. She sees the closet door cracked open but finds nothing there. That night, a storm comes, and Julie has a hard time falling asleep. She hears the closet door creak again, and a flash of lightning reveals a child peeking from behind it. Julie frantically wakes up Daniel, who checks the closet and finds no one inside.

Julie continues to experience eerie incidents at home. She sees a boy in the snow who points at her when she asks where his mother is. Later, when trying out a baby monitor, she sees a face in the nursery mirror. Frantic, she calls 911, but the police find no intruder. Daniel doubts her sanity, leading to an argument and his decision to hire a nurse. That night, Julie finds toys for her stillborn son Andrew and cries herself to sleep, only to be awakened by a toy car moving on the ceiling and a boy's apparition.

Daniel hires nurse Delmy Walker to care for Julie. Delmy shares her struggles with infertility with Julie as why she took out the role as a doula to help other mothers. Julie experiences Braxton Hicks contractions and sees Andrew's reflection again. Dr. Meadows, informed of Julie's mental state, prescribes medication and suggests the possibility of admitting her to a mental facility, which Julie overhears.

Delmy begins giving Julie her medicine that very night. The days pass, and Julie now appears to be stress-free, enjoying her time with Delmy. On day 46 of Julie’s bed rest, with 10 days left until she is set to give birth, Julie calls for Andrew and his spirit appears in the bathroom much to her delight. Andrew warns his mother that she needs to leave and that ‘she wants baby sister’. Julie asks her son who he is talking about, but he disappears when Delmy re-enters the bathroom. This causes Julie to begin to suspect that Delmy wants her daughter. She shares her concerns and Andrew’s warning with Daniel.

Another week passes, and three days remain until Julie’s due date. Delmy gives Julie another health exam before telling her a story about a family that once lived in the area. The couple had three children, and the mother was pregnant with a fourth. The couple had been on their way to the hospital to have their fourth child when their car skidded on some ice and crashed, taking their unborn daughter’s life. Afterwards, the wife fell into a deep depression, and eventually killed herself. Julie asks what the mother’s name was, and Delmy answers that the woman’s name was Melandra Kinsey. Julie glances at the bracelet on her wrist and finds a charm with the initials ‘MK’ on it. Julie calls the local newspaper inquiring if they had any archived articles about Melandra Kinsey.

On the last day of her bed rest, Julie sees Andrew once again using the nursery camera, and asks him if Melandra Kinsey is the person who wants her baby. Andrew runs away hearing the name, and Julie sees him standing with two other boys before the camera dies. After hearing heavy footsteps and seeing ghostly hands on her stomach, Julie calls out for Delmy. Thinking that Julie is in the early stages of labor, Delmy goes to get dressed.

Julie is horrified when she learns from the archive's response that Melandra drowned her three sons in the bathtub before taking her own life. When Delmy re-enters the room with Daniel, Julie begs to be taken to the hospital because she believes Melandra's spirit is in the house and wants their baby. Julie has a contraction, and Daniel and Delmy begin to witness the paranormal activity for themselves. Delmy yells at Melandra to leave Julie alone, but is thrown out the window to her death. Julie and Daniel run for their lives, but Melandra refuses to let them leave. Daniel is hit on the head with a tool and is knocked unconscious. Julie’s waters break, and she uses one of the walkie-talkies to try and call the police for help but is yanked into an unused bathtub.

Julie gives birth to her daughter in the tub, and Melandra appears in the bathroom, sucking the life out of the baby. While attempting to fight back, Julie realizes that the floor underneath the tub is made of rotten wood. She shakes the bathtub until the floor underneath caves, sending the tub crashing down to the first floor with Julie and the baby inside. The baby is alive, but Julie is dying from her injuries. Hearing the baby crying, Daniel awakens, and a weakened Julie urges Daniel to take their daughter and flee. Daniel takes his daughter and attempts to break the front doors down, but they won’t budge. As Melandra advances on Daniel and the baby, Julie puts Melandra into a chokehold before ordering the ghost to leave. Melandra is apparently banished to the afterlife.

Reveling in her victory, Julie calls out to Daniel, but he does not hear her. Paramedics arrive at the house, and Daniel yells to them to help her. Julie then sees her own corpse amongst the wreckage of the bathtub before a little boy’s ghost appears and guides her to a room where Andrew is waiting for her in a crib. Julie holds Andrew in her arms, overjoyed to finally have the experience she had been robbed of years ago. As Julie readies herself to enter heaven with her son, she feels herself being summoned back to her body. Delmy’s ghost appears, and Julie, realizing that her husband and newborn daughter need her, asks Delmy to take care of her son until her time is up. Delmy agrees and Julie bids her son farewell. She's revived by the paramedics.

The movie ends a year later, with Daniel playing with his now one-year-old daughter and Lou the cat, before Julie enters and joins in on the fun.

== Cast ==
- Melissa Barrera as Julie Rivers
- Guy Burnet as Daniel Rivers
- Kristen Harris as Julie's OB-GYN
- Erik Athavale as Dr. Meadows
- Edie Inksetter as Delmy Walker
- Kristen Sawatzky as Melandra Kinsey
- Paul Essiembre as Dean Whittier
- Marina Stephenson Kerr as Mrs. Whittier
- Lennox Denyer as Baby Andrew Rivers

== Production ==
On July 27, 2015, Metro-Goldwyn-Mayer acquired Lori Evans Taylor's thriller spec script Bed Rest, with Karen Rosenfelt and Chris Sparlding attached to produce the film. In December 2015, the script was revealed to be on that year's "Black List" of the most-liked unproduced scripts in Hollywood. On October 25, 2021, STX Entertainment and Project X Entertainment were set to produce Bed Rest, with Evans Taylor set to make her directorial debut and produce the film with Project X's James Vanderbilt, William Sherak, Paul Neinstein and Melissa Barrera.

Along with the announcement, Barrera was set to star in the film. On December 10, 2021, Guy Burnet was cast in the film.

Filming began in November 2021 in Winnipeg.

== Release ==
Bed Rest was released on Tubi on December 7, 2022. It was previously scheduled to be released theatrically on July 15, 2022.
