= Black Tides =

American action drama film

- Directed by: Renny Harlin
- Written by: Chris Sparling; Ángel Agudo
- Produced by: Adrián Guerra; Núria Valls
- Starring: Melissa Barrera; John Travolta
- Production company: Nostromo Pictures
- Country: Spain
- Language: English

Black Tides is an upcoming English-language Spanish survival thriller film directed by Renny Harlin and written by Chris Sparling and Ángel Agudo. It stars Melissa Barrera and John Travolta.

== Premise ==
Three generations of a family on a sailing holiday face an orca attack on their boat.

== Cast ==
- Melissa Barrera as Rebecca Pierce
- John Travolta as Bill Pierce, Rebecca's estranged father
- Dylan Torrell as Sebastian Pierce
- Ella Bleu Travolta
- Álvaro Mel

== Production ==
The film is directed by Renny Harlin and written by Chris Sparling and Ángel Agudo and produced by Adrián Guerra and Nuria Valls for Nostromo Pictures.

The cast is led by Melissa Barrera and John Travolta and also contains Ella Bleu Travolta, Álvaro Mel and Dylan Torrell.

Principal photography had commenced in Gran Canaria, Spain, by October 2025.
