= In the Heights (soundtrack) =

In the Heights (Original Motion Picture Soundtrack)

Soundtrack album by Lin-Manuel Miranda
- Released: June 10, 2021
- Genre: Film soundtrack
- Length: 72:17
- Labels: Atlantic; WaterTower
- Producers: Alex Lacamoire; Bill Sherman; Lin-Manuel Miranda; Greg Wells

Lin-Manuel Miranda chronology
Hamilton (2020)	In the Heights (Original Motion Picture Soundtrack) (2021)	Vivo (2021)

Alex Lacamoire chronology
Fosse/Verdon (2019)	In the Heights (Original Motion Picture Soundtrack) (2021)	Vivo (2021)

Singles from In the Heights (Original Motion Picture Soundtrack)
- 1. "In the Heights" Released: April 23, 2021; 2. "96,000" Released: May 3, 2021

In the Heights is the soundtrack album to the 2021 American film In the Heights, based on the stage musical of the same name. The original tracks are written and composed by Lin-Manuel Miranda, who co-produced the album along with Alex Lacamoire, Bill Sherman and Greg Wells. The soundtrack album was released by Atlantic Records and WaterTower Music on June 10, 2021, the same day as its U.S. release, and peaked at number one on Billboard's Soundtracks Chart.

== Development ==
The track list was unveiled on April 21, 2021. The title track was made available with the album's pre-order on April 23, 2021. The song "96,000" was released via streaming on May 3, 2021. The film contains one new song, "Home All Summer", which plays during the end credits and is the last track on the album. "Piragua (Reprise)" is not listed in the tracklist as it is part of a post credits scene.

== Track listing ==
All tracks are written by Lin-Manuel Miranda.

In the Heights (Original Motion Picture Soundtrack) track listing
No.	Title	Performer(s)	Length
1.	"In the Heights"	Anthony Ramos; Lin-Manuel Miranda; Olga Merediz; Jimmy Smits; Daphne Rubin-Vega; Stephanie Beatriz; Dascha Polanco; Corey Hawkins; Gregory Diaz IV; Melissa Barrera	7:41
2.	"Benny's Dispatch"	Hawkins; Leslie Grace	2:20
3.	"Breathe" (featuring Rubén Blades and Doreen Montalvo)	Grace	4:06
4.	"No Me Diga"	Rubin-Vega; Beatriz; Polanco; Grace; Barrera	2:24
5.	"It Won't Be Long Now"	Barrera; Ramos; Diaz	3:38
6.	"96,000"	Ramos; Hawkins; Diaz; Noah Catala; Rubin-Vega; Beatriz; Polanco; Barrera	5:45
7.	"Piragua"	Miranda	1:42
8.	"When You're Home"	Grace; Hawkins	5:23
9.	"The Club"	Ramos; Barrera; Hawkins	4:48
10.	"Blackout"	Ramos; Hawkins; Barrera; Merediz; Diaz; Catala; Rubin-Vega; Beatriz; Polanco	3:20
11.	"Paciencia y Fe"	Merediz	4:39
12.	"Alabanza"	Ramos; Grace; Smits; Catala; Barrera; Hawkins; Diaz; Polanco; Rubin-Vega; Beatriz	3:18
13.	"Carnaval del Barrio"	Rubin-Vega; Beatriz; Polanco; Barrera; Ramos; Miranda; Hawkins; Diaz; Grace	7:00
14.	"When the Sun Goes Down"	Hawkins; Grace	2:52
15.	"Champagne"	Barrera; Ramos	2:53
16.	"Finale"	Montalvo; Ramos; Beatriz; Rubin-Vega; Polanco; Smits; Miranda; Grace; Barrera	5:29
17.	"Home All Summer" (featuring Marc Anthony)	Ramos; Grace	3:48
Total length:			1:12:17

== Charts ==
Chart performance for In the Heights (Original Motion Picture Soundtrack)
Chart (2021)	Peak position
Australian Albums (ARIA)	59
UK Compilation Albums (OCC)	5
UK Digital Albums (OCC)	12
UK Soundtrack Albums (OCC)	1
US Billboard 200	45
US Soundtrack Albums (Billboard)	1
