= Xavier Zazueta =

Mexican singer-songwriter and businessman (born 1987)

- Born: Francisco Xavier Zazueta Muñoz. Jr; January 22, 1987 (age 39); Ciudad Obregón, Sonora, Mexico
- Education: Colegio Teresiano de la Vera- Cruz
- Alma mater: TecMilenio University (BBA)
- Occupation: Singer • songwriter • businessman
- Years active: 2001–present
- Spouse: Melissa Barrera (m. 2019)
- Musical career
- Genres: Pop; latin pop; folk; pop rock
- Instruments: Vocals; guitar
- Labels: Azteca Music; PRODISC; Fonovisa

Francisco Xavier Zazueta Muñoz. Jr (born 22 January 1987), formerly known professionally as Paco Zazueta, is a Mexican singer-songwriter and businessman. He first gained national recognition as a contestant on the ninth season of the reality musical talent show La Academia in 2011. Following the competition, in 2012, he released his debut self-titled studio album, Paco Zazueta, featuring a mix of regional Mexican and pop influences.

Zazueta is also known for his collaborative musical work with his wife, actress and producer Melissa Barrera, whom he met while competing on La Academia.

== Early life and education ==
Francisco Xavier Zazueta Muñoz was born on January 22, 1987, in Ciudad Obregón, Sonora, Mexico.

Zazueta received his early and secondary education at the Colegio Teresiano de la Vera-Cruz. Following high school, he graduated TecMilenio University with a Bachelor of Business Administration degree.

He was trained as a professional butcher.

== Musical career ==
=== 2001-2010: Career beginnings ===
Zazueta began his musical journey in 2001 at the age of 14, performing at local venues and community events in his hometown.

=== 2011–2012: La Academia and musical debut ===
In 2011, Zazueta transitioned to a professional career by competing in the ninth season of the TV Azteca reality series La Academia. Representing Sonora, he progressed through the competition to the 14th concert, gaining a national following before his elimination.

Following the series, he signed with Azteca Music to record his first studio project In 2012, he released his self-titled debut album, Paco Zazueta. The project featured singles such as "Melissa" and "Hazme Olvidarla," as well as the duet "No Me Puedo Escapar de Ti."

=== 2013–present: Independent releases and digital presence ===
Since his debut, Zazueta has operated as an independent artist, prioritizing digital distribution and live performances.

In recent years, Zazueta has focused on acoustic reinterpretations of his work and select new recordings that highlight his vocal development.

== Business career ==
Zazueta serves as an executive for the meat company Carnes Zazueta.

== Personal life ==
Zazueta began a relationship with actress Melissa Barrera in September 2011, after the two met as contestants during the ninth season of La Academia. After dating for over six years, the couple announced their engagement in June 2017. Zazueta and Barrera were married in a private ceremony in February 2019.

== Filmography ==
Year	Title	Role	Notes
2011	La Academia	Himself	Contestant; 13 episodes

=== Music videos ===
Year	Title	Director
2015	Ya No Puedo Estar Sin Ti	TBA
2019	Melissa	TBA
2022	Morrita	TBA
2022	Hazme Olvidarla	TBA
2023	Ni La Pensaste	TBA
2023	Salud Y Pa' Delante	TBA

== Discography ==
=== Studio albums ===
List of studio albums, with selected information
Title	Details
Paco Zazueta	Release date: October 26, 2012; Label: PRODISC; Formats: CD, digital download, streaming
Disfraz De Amigo	Release date: August 19, 2022; Label: Fonovisa Records; Formats: CD, digital download, streaming

=== Extended plays ===
List of extended plays, with selected information
Title	Details
Mis Covers	Release date: November 14, 2022; Label: Fonovisa Records; Formats: CD, digital download, streaming

=== Singles ===
List of singles, with selected information
Year	Title	Album
2012	''No Me Puedo Escapar de Ti" (feat. Melissa Barrera)	Paco Zazueta
2015	''No Puedo Estar Sin Ti"	Non-album single
2019	''Melissa''	Non-album single
2022	''Morrita''	Disfraz De Amigo
2022	''Lamentablemente''	Disfraz De Amigo
2023	''Ni La Pensaste''	Non-album single
2023	''Salud Y Pa' Delante''	Non-album single

=== Other appearances ===
Year	Title	Lead artist	Album
2025	"Mi Ángel"	Jaime Lozano & The Familia	Songs By An Immigrant Vol.3
