= Tanto amor (TV series) =

2015–16 Mexican telenovela

- Genre: Telenovela
- Created by: Mauricio Samuano; Gloria Bautista
- Story by: Ligia Lezama
- Directed by: Luis Servando Reyes, Rodrigo Cachero, Eduardo Ripari
- Starring: Leonardo García; Melissa Barrera; Rossana Nájera; Andrea Noli; Arap Bethke; Aura Cristina Geithner; Matías Novoa; Ofelia Medina
- Theme music composer: Ximena Muñoz
- Opening theme: "Volver a caer" by Kalimba and Melissa Barrera
- Country of origin: Mexico
- Original language: Spanish
- No. of episodes: 120

Production
- Executive producer: Rita Fusaro
- Producers: Miguel Ángel López Fuentes, Marcela de la Barrera, Elisa Salinas, Pedro Lira
- Editors: Pamela Lechuga, Rey Estudillo
- Camera setup: Multi-camera
- Production company: TV Azteca

Original release
- Network: Azteca Trece
- Release: August 2, 2015 – January 15, 2016

Related
- Pasiones (1988)

Tanto amor, is a Mexican telenovela produced by Rita Fusaro for El Trece. It is a remake of the Argentine telenovela Pasiones produced in 1988.

Melissa Barrera and Leonardo García star as the main protagonists, while Arap Bethke, Aura Cristina Geithner and Rossana Nájera as the main antagonists.

== Synopsis ==
In a matter of hours Mia lost her home, her job and her mother, a fact that will change her life and that of her two sisters, the arrogant and irresponsible Noelia and the sweet Mary, who was blind from birth. The three young women whose dreams and ways of acting are as different as pepper and sugar, lived under the protective wing of Don Oscar, the patriarch of the Lombardos, for whom their mother Francisca was much more than a cook, an ally and their confident. Alberto believed he was in control of his life and world, so much so that he believes he has found love in Oriana, his fiancée, but this is about to end. The unexpected death of his grandfather, Don Oscar, makes him return from Spain to Los Ciruelos, the hacienda owned by the Lombardo family. Alberto feels overwhelmed, in his conscience the last words of fury that he exchanged with the old Don Oscar reverberate, the same words that led him to his self-exile.

== Cast ==
=== Main ===
- Leonardo García as Alberto Lombardo
- Melissa Barrera as Mía González
- Rossana Nájera as Oriana Roldán
- Andrea Noli as Carolina Méndez
- Arap Bethke as Bruno Lombardo
- Aura Cristina Geithner as Altagracia Roldán
- Matías Novoa as David Roldán
- Ofelia Medina as Silvia Lombardo

=== Recurring ===
- Omar Fierro as Jesús Roldán
- Sergio Klainer as Don Óscar
- María José Magan as Teresa Lombardo
- Jorge Luis Velázquez as Tony García
- Adianez Hernández as Noelia González
- Miri Higareda as Mary González
- Ramiro Huerta as Santana
- Juan Vidal as Rafael Lombardo
- Ana Karina Guevara as Doña Francisca
- Hugo Catalán as Eloy
- Germán Valdés as René
- Eva Prado as Yolanda
- Valeria Galviz as Amaranta
- Andrea Carreiro as Brisa
- Alexis Meanas as Santiago
- Christian Wolf as Jaime
- Thalía Gómez as Paty
- Marco de la O as Raúl
- Valeria Lorduguín as Jazmín
- Alan Castillo as Tavo
