= Keep Breathing (TV series) =

2022 Netflix survival drama television series

- Official Netflix Poster
- Genre: Survival drama
- Created by: Martin Gero; Brendan Gall
- Starring: Melissa Barrera; Jeff Wilbusch; Florencia Lozano; Juan Pablo Espinosa; Austin Stowell; Getenesh Berhe
- Music by: Blake Neely
- Country of origin: United States
- Original language: English
- No. of episodes: 6

Production
- Executive producers: Martin Gero; Brendan Gall; Maggie Kiley
- Production location: Vancouver
- Running time: 31–40 minutes
- Production companies: Wide Awake Productions; Quinn's House; Warner Bros. Television

Original release
- Network: Netflix
- Release: July 28, 2022

Keep Breathing is an American survival drama television limited series created by Martin Gero and Brendan Gall for Netflix. The series consisted of six episodes, and premiered on July 28, 2022.

== Premise ==
When a small plane crashes in the middle of the Canadian wilderness, a lone woman must battle the elements and odds to survive.

== Cast ==
- Melissa Barrera as Olivia "Liv" Rivera, a sharp attorney who crashes in the middle of the Canadian wilderness
- Jeff Wilbusch as Danny, Liv's off-again, on-again love interest
- Florencia Lozano as Mrs. Rivera, Liv's mother
- Juan Pablo Espinosa as Mr. Rivera, Liv's father
- Austin Stowell as Sam, a co-pilot who lets Liv fly with them
- Getenesh Berhe as Ruth, Liv's co-worker and friend, who initially sets her and Danny up on a date

== Episodes ==
No.	Title	Directed by	Written by	Original release date
1	"Arrivals"	Maggie Kiley	Brendan Gall & Martin Gero	July 28, 2022
Desperate to reach Inuvik after her flight is cancelled, New York lawyer Liv Rivera hitches a ride on a small private plane. Then, disaster strikes.
2	"Fire & Water"	Maggie Kiley	Teleplay by : Brendan Gall; Story by : Martin Gero & Brendan Gall	July 28, 2022
With the plane lying beneath the frigid water, Liv attempts to retrieve valuable supplies at the bottom of the lake as past demons come to the surface.
3	"Hierarchy of Needs"	Maggie Kiley	Teleplay by : Brendan Gall; Story by : Brendan Gall & Martin Gero	July 28, 2022
In the wilderness, Liv scrambles to secure food, fire, water and shelter. Flashbacks reveal Liv's painful past and the reason for her journey.
4	"Departures"	Rebecca Rodriguez	Teleplay by : Iturri Sosa; Story by : Martin Gero & Brendan Gall & Iturri Sosa	July 28, 2022
Childhood memories help - and hinder - a resourceful Liv as she hikes through the woods in search of the light she saw the night before.
5	"Awake & Dreaming"	Rebecca Rodriguez	Teleplay by : Brendan Gall; Story by : Brendan Gall & Martin Gero	July 28, 2022
Slipping in and out of consciousness, a trapped Liv must decide whether to continue fighting for survival - or just let go.
6	"You Are Home"	Rebecca Rodriguez	Teleplay by : Brendan Gall; Story by : Martin Gero & Brendan Gall	July 28, 2022
After a giant leap, Liv faces a series of daunting challenges but finds hope and clarity when visions of her loved ones appear.

== Production ==
=== Development ===
In February 2021, Breathe was given a series order. The series is created, written, and executive produced by Martin Gero and Brendan Gall. Warner Bros. Television produces the series. Maggie Kiley joined the series as executive producer and director of the first three episodes in June 2021. The series was retitled Keep Breathing in June 2022.

=== Casting ===
In June 2021, Melissa Barrera was set to star in the series. Jeff Wilbusch was added as a recurring guest star one month later. The same month, Florencia Lozano and Juan Pablo Espinosa joined as recurring. Austin Stowell joined the cast in September 2021.

=== Filming ===
Filming began on June 28, 2021, in Vancouver, and wrapped on September 20, 2021.

== Reception ==
The review aggregator website Rotten Tomatoes reported a 56% approval rating with an average rating of 5.60/10, based on 18 critic reviews. The website's critical consensus reads, "Brisk pacing and Melissa Barrera's compelling presence help Keep Breathing stay alive, even as the series chokes whenever it tries to broaden its scope." Metacritic, which uses a weighted average, assigned a score of 45 out of 100 based on 7 critics, indicating "mixed or average reviews".
