= American School Foundation of Monterrey =

Location
- Ave. Ignacio Morones Prieto No. 1500; Col. San Isidro; Santa Catarina, Nuevo León; Mexico; 25.660772°N 100.446860°W

Information
- Type: Private, co-ed, international
- Motto: Take Responsibility. Meet Expectations. Go Beyond.
- Established: 1928
- Superintendent: George Stewart
- CEEB code: 870760
- Board president: Jose Cardenas Lozano
- Elementary principal: Donald Bertolo
- Middle school principal: Juan David Lopez
- High school campus director: Juan David Lopez
- Director of teachers and learning: Melanie Henning
- Grades: N–12
- Enrollment: 2,393
- Campus: Urban
- Colors: Red and white
- Mascot: American bald eagle
- Nickname: ASFM
- Affiliation: AdvancED – Cognia
- Website: asfm.edu.mx

The American School Foundation of Monterrey (ASFM) is a private, nonprofit, international school located in Monterrey, Mexico, which provides an American-type education to international and Mexican students. It is one of a few American-style educational centers in the city, and is notable for being the oldest one of that group.

The school is governed by a founders' board which meets twice a year and elects a board of directors serving as the school's board of education. This board is composed of 15 members serving up to four three-year terms. All instruction is in English, except for Spanish classes. For grades 10 to 12 there are two courses of study, one leading to a Mexican bachillerato and the other to a U.S. high school diploma. Students can choose either to follow just the U.S. diploma or both courses. The option to do the Mexican bachillerato alone is not offered.

== History ==
ASFM was founded in 1928 as a response to the need for children of foreign (mainly American) workers in Monterrey to have an American-style education in order to eventually return seamlessly to the United States. The school received its charter on October 13, 1928, and was re-established as the American School Foundation of Monterrey in April 1944.

It was during this re-establishment that the founders' board was established with four founding individuals and thirteen sponsoring companies. The organization was created as a non-profit society, hence the inclusion of the word Foundation in the name. In 1948, ASFM received accreditation from the Southern Association of Colleges and Schools and the Texas Education agency. The school moved to the "Missouri Campus" (located on a street named Rio Missouri), in September 1958, when its enrollment had exceeded 450 students.

The school's reputation improved over time and it remained the school of choice for the children of foreign workers that relocated to Monterrey. As the city's influx of foreigners increased, the need for an international education grew in demand. In 1996, in order to accommodate this increasing population, ASFM built a new campus for middle and high school students. This new state-of-the-art facility built in the Huasteca Canyon attracted many new students and launched ASFM into its present era. The Missouri Campus was used for nursery through 5th grade students. However, in August 2010 these students also switched locations to La Huasteca, where a newly constructed elementary school was built. With nursery through twelfth grade reunited to one location, the school continues to maintain a status as one of the most exclusive institutions in Mexico and Latin America.

== High school profile ==
For the 2021–2022 school year, the total enrollment comprised 2,454 students, 88% of whom were Mexican, with the remaining 12% being American and of 15 other nationalities. Approximately 20% of the students overall held dual or multiple nationalities. The high school had a faculty of 278 teachers, all of whom held teaching certificates or degrees, with around 66% holding advanced degrees.

== Facilities ==
The MSHS campus (previously called Huasteca Campus) features 10 fully equipped science labs, six computer labs, 62 teaching classrooms, a black-box theater, a 500-seat auditorium and a media center that incorporates a fully equipped production studio with five recording rooms, performance area, conference spaces and study zones. The media center can accommodate three full classes simultaneously, and holds an online and printed collection of over 20,000 titles.

The school sponsored a fundraiser for the construction of a STEM Lab, Business Incubator, Maker Pods, three eco-patios and the Audiovisual Production Studio inside the media center.

The campus for elementary school (previously called the Missouri Campus) was built right next to the Huasteca campus, nicknamed "Huastequita", is for students in nursery to grade 5 and has 64 classrooms, four state-of-the-art computer labs, library, projection room, the administrative, counseling and athletic offices, clinic, maintenance area, roofed parking lot, three playgrounds, instrumental music rooms, multipurpose room, and cafeteria.

The school sponsored a fundraiser for the construction of a Flexible Learning Space, amphitheater, Sensory Motor Gym, a natural playground and an Adventure Challenge Course.

The Athletic Department features two indoor gymnasiums with parquet-floored basketball courts, two regulation-sized soccer fields, three playing fields, an eight-lane athletics track, two outdoor concrete-floor basketball courts, a volleyball court, a fully equipped conditioning gym, several other training rooms, and four full locker rooms.

== Model UN program ==
ASFM houses one of the largest international Model UN conferences in Mexico: IMMUNS (International Monterrey Model United Nations Simulation). IMMUNS was established as a brand in 2003 when the high school and middle school Model UN conferences fused into one large event. Traditionally, IMMUNS is held in mid-February, and involves around 500 local and international students. Previous keynote speakers include Jane Goodall (2003), Pedro Ferriz de Con (2013), Fernando Elizondo Barragán (2017), and Yeonmi Park (2017). The MUN program is divided into different classes for each grade level (starting in the 9th grade) - MUN 9, MUN 10, MUN 11, and MUN Secretariat 10-12. Its MUN 10 class hosts a yearly musical talent show called VOICES, where students pick songs based around a rotating theme. The 2018–2019 class was the first to ever run 2 VOICES in the same school-year.

== Traditions and athletics ==
The school's mascot is the American bald eagle, and the colors are red and white. ASFM participates in yearly sports tournaments sponsored by the Association of American Schools in Mexico (ASOMEX). It competes in soccer, basketball, track and field and in several other sports. The school has a rivalry with other bilingual schools in the city, the Colegio Inglés and AIM.

The school also issues several awards each year.

- Steve Fordham Award: The most important all-around award is the Benjamin Steve Fordham Award, given to the student at each grade level that best exemplifies leadership, citizenship, responsibility, friendliness, academic excellence, sportsmanship, and cooperation. Two nominees are named along with the winner. This award was established in memory of Steve Fordham, an ASFM student who earned a Purple Heart during the Vietnam War and who held the qualities that the award recognizes.
- Aguirre and de la Garza Evia Quiroga Awards: The Alejandro Aguirre Award is given to an exceptional 9th grade student in the athletics program. The Carlos de la Garza Evia Quiroga Memorial Award is given to the 9th grade student displaying humanitarianism and service.
- Graduation awards: At graduation, ASFM recognizes the valedictorian and salutatorian for each graduating class. The valedictorian gives a closing address, and the salutatorian recites the Invocation at the start of the ceremony. The American Legion Award is given to the graduating senior best exhibiting courage, scholarship, patriotism, honor, leadership, and service. This award is not given by ASFM, but by the American Legion chapter of Monterrey.
- Eagle Awards: In honor of its mascot, the school issues the Eagle Award to students who have been at ASFM for 15 years and the Eagle of the Month Award to students exhibiting excellent academic, citizenship and overall performance.

== Finances ==
Tuition rates are available at the school's website.

There is an entrance fee for all new students of US$8,910.

If a student withdraws from the school and wishes to return, there is a $26,170 MXN or $13,780 MXN new registration fee for N-12th grade and the Bach program respectively.

== See also ==
- American immigration to Mexico
