= Carmen (2022 film) =

Film by Benjamin Millepied

- French theatrical release poster
- Directed by: Benjamin Millepied
- Screenplay by: Alexander Dinelaris Jr.; Loïc Barrère; Benjamin Millepied
- Story by: Benjamin Millepied; Loïc Barrère
- Produced by: Mimi Valdès; Dimitri Rassam; Rosemary Blight
- Starring: Melissa Barrera; Paul Mescal; Rossy de Palma; Tracy Curry
- Cinematography: Jörg Widmer
- Edited by: Dany Cooper
- Music by: Nicholas Britell
- Production companies: Chapter 2; Goalpost Pictures; France 2 Cinéma; Marvelous Productions; TF1 Studio
- Distributed by: Madman Films (Australia); Pathé Distribution (France); Sony Pictures Classics (United States)
- Release dates: 11 September 2022 (TIFF); 21 April 2023 (United States); 14 June 2023 (France); 13 July 2023 (Australia)
- Running time: 117 minutes
- Countries: Australia; France; United States
- Languages: English; Spanish
- Box office: $380,996

Carmen is a 2022 musical drama film directed by Benjamin Millepied in his feature directorial debut from a screenplay by Alexander Dinelaris Jr., Loïc Barrère, and Millepied from a screen story by Millepied and Barrère. The film stars Melissa Barrera, Paul Mescal, Rossy de Palma and Tracy Curry.

Though described as Millepied's take on Bizet's opera of the same name, it is "a complete re-imagining" that ignores the opera's plot and setting; all that remains are "selected lyrics" from the opera's libretto sung in the original French by a choir as background to one scene between the two leads. The film features an original score composed by Nicholas Britell with songs written and composed by Britell, Taura Stinson, Julieta Venegas and Curry.

The film premiered at the Toronto International Film Festival on 11 September 2022. It was released in the United States on 21 April 2023 by Sony Pictures Classics, in France on 14 June 2023 by Pathé Distribution, and in Australia on 13 July by Madman Films.

== Premise ==
Carmen flees the Mexican desert, is rescued by Aidan, and together they struggle to evade the authorities as they head for Los Angeles.

== Plot ==
In Mexico, a young man searching for Carmen shoots and kills her mother, a flamenco dancer, when she refuses to give Carmen up. Carmen decides to flee across the border. In Texas, Aidan, an unemployed Marine veteran living with his sister, is persuaded to join a militia border patrol and is paired with his friend Mike. The two find a truck in which Carmen is hiding with another woman, several children and two men. To Aidan's horror, Mike shoots and kills the two men, and then pursues Carmen when she tries to run. Aidan helps the woman and children escape and kills Mike to protect Carmen. Carmen and Aidan flee in Mike's car.

The pair overpower a pair of police officers who have tracked them to a motel and hail a taxi driver, Angel, who agrees to take them to Los Angeles. On the way, they stop at a surreal carnival, where they part ways with Angel and join Pablo. Pablo propositions Carmen but she turns him down, saying she prefers Aidan. Aidan reveals that he understands Spanish. Pablo takes them to a club in Los Angeles owned by Carmen's family friend Masilda, who takes them in. Aidan intends to leave Carmen at the club but changes his mind when they are startled by police and instead stays with her. Aidan calls his sister, who confirms the authorities are looking for him. He tells her he is not coming home. Masilda encourages Carmen to dance, while Aidan tries to work out their next move. The pair are haunted by visions, including Carmen's mother and a mysterious figure dressed in sequins.

Aidan becomes concerned that the authorities have tracked them to the club and wants to move on, but they have no money. He tries to persuade Carmen to stay at the club where she is safe, but she refuses to be left behind. While she performs a dance at the club, Aidan takes part in an underground bare-knuckle boxing match with a large prize pot, recommended by a former comrade of his. After finishing dancing, Carmen goes to the fight and arrives in time to see Aidan win, but she is followed by police, who raid the fight. The pair initially evade the police, but Aidan is shot while escaping, and collapses.

The pair dance together in a fantasy sequence in the desert before Aidan walks off. Later, Carmen walks on a beach, alone.

== Cast ==
- Melissa Barrera as Carmen
- Paul Mescal as Aidan
- Rossy de Palma as Masilda
- Tracy "The DOC" Curry as Referee
- Nicole da Silva as Julieanne
- Benedict Hardie as Mike
- Elsa Pataky as Gabrielle
- Tara Morice as Marie
- Marina Tamayo II as Zilah
- Zac Drayson as Pete

== Production ==
In May 2017, Benjamin Millepied was set to make his feature film directorial debut with the film version of Carmen for Chapter 2, originally conceived as "a modern-day reimagining of one of the world's most celebrated operas". Once completed, Millepied recognized his film was less an adaptation than "a version of Bizet's tragedy from a parallel universe". Loïc Barrère and Millepied will write the script. In May 2019, Sony Pictures Classics acquired distribution rights to the film for North and Latin America, Scandinavia, Eastern Europe, the CIS and the Middle East, with TF1 Studio selling remaining territories and Nilo Cruz writing the script. In November 2020, Alexander Dinelaris Jr. was revealed to have co-written the script with Millepied and Loïc Barrère.

=== Casting ===
In May 2019, it was announced that Melissa Barrera and Jamie Dornan were cast as Carmen and Aidan, respectively. In November 2020, Paul Mescal replaced Dornan and Rossy de Palma was cast in the film.

=== Filming ===
Principal photography commenced on 18 January 2021 in Australia with Jörg Widmer as the cinematographer, and wrapped in early March 2021.

== Music ==
Nicholas Britell composed the score and co-wrote the songs with Julieta Venegas, Taura Stinson and Tracy "The DOC" Curry. Lynn Fainchtein served as music producer and music supervisor.

== Release ==
Carmen had its world premiere at the Toronto International Film Festival on 11 September 2022. It had a limited theatrical release in the United States on 21 April 2023 by Sony Pictures Classics, and was released theatrically in France on 14 June 2023 by Pathé Distribution and in Australia on 13 July by Madman Films.

The film was released on Blu-ray, DVD, and digital download on 11 July 2023.

== Reception ==
On the review aggregator website Rotten Tomatoes, 60% of 98 critics' reviews are positive, with an average rating of 6.2/10. The website's consensus reads: "Benjamin Millepied reinvents Prosper Mérimée's tragic novella as a dance extravaganza full of sound and fury signifying a hollow emotional core, although the ravishing style is a treat onto itself." Metacritic, which uses a weighted average, assigned the film a score of 59 out of 100, based on 26 critics, indicating "mixed or average" reviews.

=== Accolades ===
Award	Date of ceremony	Category	Recipient(s)	Result	Ref.
Toronto International Film Festival	September 18, 2022	FIPRESCI Prize	Carmen	Nominated	
Miami Film Festival	March 12, 2023	Jordan Ressler First Feature Award	Benjamin Millepied	Nominated	
Hollywood Music in Media Awards	November 15, 2023	Music Themed Film, Biopic, or Musical	Carmen	Nominated	
