= Your Monster =

2024 film by Caroline Lindy

- Theatrical release poster
- Directed by: Caroline Lindy
- Written by: Caroline Lindy
- Based on: Your Monster by Caroline Lindy
- Produced by: Kayla Foster; Caroline Lindy; Shannon Reilly; Kira Carstensen; Melanie Donkers
- Starring: Melissa Barrera; Tommy Dewey; Edmund Donovan; Kayla Foster; Meghann Fahy
- Cinematography: Will Stone
- Edited by: Daysha Broadway; Jon C. Higgins
- Music by: Timothy Williams; The Lazours (original songs)
- Production companies: Bombo Sports and Entertainment; Merman Films
- Distributed by: Vertical
- Release dates: January 18, 2024 (Sundance); October 25, 2024 (United States)
- Running time: 98 minutes
- Country: United States
- Language: English
- Budget: $300,000
- Box office: $809,893

Your Monster is a 2024 American romantic comedy horror film written and directed by Caroline Lindy, based on her 2019 short film. It stars Melissa Barrera and Tommy Dewey, with Edmund Donovan, Kayla Foster, and Meghann Fahy in supporting roles. The film follows a young musical actress grappling with a cancer diagnosis and a painful breakup who moves back into her childhood home, where she finds a monster living in her closet.

Your Monster had its world premiere at the Sundance Film Festival on January 18, 2024. The film was released in the United States on October 25, 2024, by Vertical.

== Plot ==
Laura Franco is a young actress enduring a cancer diagnosis. She tries to cope after being broken up with by her playwright boyfriend Jacob Sullivan, whose play she helped write prior to their split.

Laura's best friend Mazie drives her to her childhood home in Manhattan, where she is forced to live following the breakup. She discovers a monster living in the closet upstairs. Though initially frightened by him and his demands for her to move out, Laura and Monster bond over their shared love of theater, and Monster eventually agrees to let her stay.

Monster convinces Laura to attend auditions for Jacob's play, particularly for the main role, which Jacob originally wrote for Laura. Jacob refuses to cast her, instead selecting acclaimed actress Jackie Dennon, but allows Laura to understudy for Jackie. Laura struggles to watch Jacob and Jackie's apparent flirtations during rehearsals, but finds solace at home with Monster. Laura invites Monster to a Halloween party hosted by the theater. He declines, but later arrives and dances with Laura among the other partygoers. Laura discovers Jacob hooking up with a woman, which she assumes is Jackie. Using his powers, Monster distracts Jacob towards a nearby trapdoor that opens and drops him to the floor below, injuring his arm. Laura excoriates Monster, but he convinces her that Jacob deserved to be hurt in retaliation for breaking up with her amidst her cancer treatment. Laura and Monster return home and have sex.

At another rehearsal, a castmate informs Jackie about Jacob and Laura's past. She later struggles to perform on stage and is berated by Jacob, but Laura comes to her defense, then begins to unload all of her resentment towards Jacob in front of the entire cast and crew. Laura meets Jacob that evening to discuss what happened, whereupon she admits that she is ashamed of herself for still caring about him and feeling jealous that she found him with another woman. When she demands to know why Jacob stopped loving her, he kisses her. They proceed to have sex in his office, after which Jacob divulges that Laura has been fired from the production.

Laura returns home to find Monster in the closet and discovers his hidden home, filled with articles of her clothing and other items taken from her over the years. She reveals her and Jacob's tryst to Monster, angering him greatly. Monster asserts that Jacob has never loved Laura, but Laura accuses him of not knowing anything about love because he is a monster and has always been hiding. Monster reveals that he has not been hiding, recounting other occasions throughout Laura's life when he tried to help her but she barred him in the closet out of fear. Laura leaves and shuts the closet, but opens it again out of regret, only to find that Monster has disappeared.

At a checkup at the hospital, Laura is declared cancer-free, but does not delight in the news. Jackie meets Laura outside her home to apologize, but Laura dismisses her. Jackie clarifies that she never had relations with Jacob, and arranges for Laura to take her place as the lead on the play's opening night. While sneaking into the building, Laura catches Jacob and Mazie having sex. Mazie follows Laura into the dressing room to apologize, but Laura furiously orders her out.

Laura appears on stage and performs. Her performance is well-received by the audience, to Jacob's chagrin. He confronts her alone behind the curtains, demanding she not ruin his chance of success and accusing her of being jealous of his talent. She is cold and dismissive of him even as he becomes increasingly angry, eventually warning that she will tear his throat out if he doesn't stop insulting her. Monster then appears from the shadows, slashes Jacob's throat open, and reconciles with Laura. The curtains then open, and a bloodstained Laura performs the final song. Monster is absent from the stage; he is actually a manifestation of Laura's violent thoughts, having never truly existed. The crowd panics over the sight of Jacob's corpse as Laura smiles and lets out a monstrous growl.

== Cast ==
- Melissa Barrera as Laura Franco
- Tommy Dewey as Monster
- Edmund Donovan as Jacob Sullivan
- Meghann Fahy as Jackie Dennon
- Kayla Foster as Mazie Silverberg
- Ikechukwu Ufomadu as Don McBride

== Production ==
Your Monster is from Merman Productions. Lindy and Kayla Foster produced, with Shannon Reilly from Bombo Sports and Entertainment, and Kira Carstensen and Melanie Donkers for Mermade. Barrera described the project to Collider as an "incredible indie movie that was so satisfying to me. And I've realized how smaller films are more creatively satisfying in a way because you get a lot more say, and it's like a real team effort. It's like basically everyone is kind of sacrificing a lot to do this very low budget thing and make it look good and make it the best that it can be, and having the highest hopes for something knowing that you don't have the huge back of a studio. I think it makes you hungrier." With news of the project coming soon after the release of her second film in the Scream franchise made some call Barrera the new "scream queen".

=== Filming ===
The film was shot in twenty days in Hoboken, New Jersey.

== Release ==
Your Monster premiered in the Midnight section of the Sundance Film Festival on January 18, 2024. In March 2024, Vertical acquired North American distribution rights to the film. The film was released in the United States on October 25, 2024.

=== Home media ===
Your Monster was released on premium video on demand on November 12, 2024. The film began streaming on Max on January 24, 2025.

== Reception ==
=== Box office ===
In the United States and Canada, Your Monster made $522,958 from 651 theaters in its opening weekend. The film went to have an even smaller limited release in the United Kingdom, Russia, Australia, and New Zealand, grossing a worldwide total of $809,893.

=== Critical response ===
On the review aggregator website Rotten Tomatoes, 79% of 98 critics' reviews are positive, with an average rating of 6.8/10. The website's consensus reads: "A wickedly delightful genre mashup led by Melissa Barrera, Your Monster is pleasantly packed with songs, guts, and heart." Metacritic, which uses a weighted average, assigned the film a score of 63 out of 100, based on 17 critics, indicating "generally favorable" reviews.

The Nashville Film Festival praised Barrera, saying, "There are very few people who can light up the screen the way that Melissa Barrera does. The multi-talented actress displays the perfect level of innocence, vulnerability, and eventually fierceness in her portrayal as Laura Franco."

Ben Kenigsberg, writing in The New York Times, praised the natural charm and emotional pull of Melissa Barrera character of Laura Franco by saying the film works with the "backstage intrigue, onstage songs by the Lazours, and the disarming lead performance of Barrera."

Chad Collins of Dread Central stated "Your Monster is liable to be the most fun you have at the movies this year, perhaps in the past several years. Writer and director Caroline Lindy’s feature debut is remarkably assured, ostensibly retelling Beauty and the Beast, though imbued with oodles of charm, a smattering of horror gore, and a truly star-making turn from Melissa Barrera. Truly, Barrera, while a star before Your Monster, ascends to an entirely different level here." The Hollywood Reporter ranked the film number 10 out of the best horror films of 2024, calling Melissa Barrera a "welcoming force" in the horror world.

=== Accolades ===
Award	Ceremony date	Category	Recipient(s)	Result	Ref.
Sun Valley Film Festival	March 3, 2024	Best Narrative Feature Film	Your Monster	Nominated	
Sun Valley Film Festival	March 3, 2024	Best Performance in a Feature Film	Melissa Barrera	Special mention	
Lower East Side Film Festival	May 7, 2024	The Best of the Festival	Your Monster	Won	
Sundance London	June 9, 2024	Audience Favourite Award	Your Monster	Won	
Brussels International Fantastic Film Festival	April 21, 2024	International Competition	Your Monster	Runner-up (Note: Shared with Cuckoo)	
Charlotte Film Festival	October 2, 2024	Audience Favorite Award	Your Monster	Won	
Los Cabo Film Festival	December 8, 2024	"Without Borders" Sin Fronteras” recipient	Melissa Barrera	Won	
Latino Entertainment Journalists Association Film Awards	January 27, 2025	Best Actress	Melissa Barrera	Nominated	
