= The House of Flowers (TV series) =

2018–2020 Mexican dark comedy television show

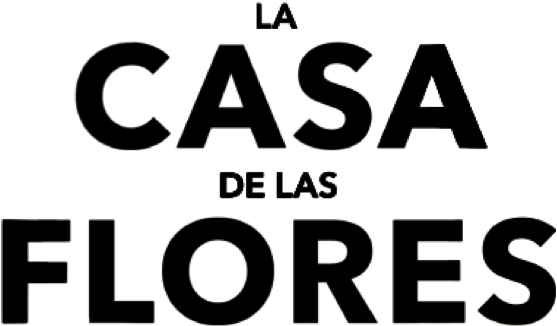
- Spanish: La Casa de las Flores
- Genre: Millennial telenovela Black comedy
- Created by: Manolo Caro
- Written by: Manolo Caro; Mara Vargas; Monika Revilla; Gabriel Nuncio; Hipatia Argüero Mendoza; Alexandro Aldrete; Kim Torres
- Directed by: Manolo Caro; Alberto Belli; Santiago Limón; Yibrán Asuad
- Starring: Verónica Castro; Cecilia Suárez; Aislinn Derbez; Darío Yazbek Bernal; Arturo Ríos; Paco León; Juan Pablo Medina; Luis de la Rosa; María León; Isela Vega
- Narrated by: Claudette Maillé
- Theme music composer: Yamil Rezc
- Opening theme: La Casa de las Flores
- Country of origin: Mexico
- Original language: Spanish
- No. of seasons: 3
- No. of episodes: 34 (list of episodes)

Production
- Executive producers: Mariana Arredondo; Manolo Caro; María José Córdova; Rafael Ley; Stacy Perskie
- Producer: Carlos Taibo
- Production locations: Mexico City; Madrid
- Cinematography: Pedro Gómez Millán
- Editor: Yibran Asuad
- Running time: 27–37 minutes
- Production company: Noc Noc Cinema

Original release
- Network: Netflix
- Release: August 10, 2018 – April 23, 2020

Related
- The House of Flowers Presents: The Funeral (2019); The House of Flowers: The Movie (2021)

The House of Flowers (Spanish: La Casa de las Flores) is a Mexican dark comedy drama television series created by Manolo Caro for Netflix. It depicts a dysfunctional upper-class Mexican family that owns a prestigious floristry shop and a struggling cabaret, both called 'The House of Flowers'. The series, almost entirely written and directed by its creator, stars Verónica Castro, Cecilia Suárez, Aislinn Derbez, Darío Yazbek Bernal, Arturo Ríos, Paco León, Juan Pablo Medina, Luis de la Rosa, María León, and Isela Vega.

The 13-episode first season was released on August 10, 2018. A second and third season of the series were announced in October 2018; Verónica Castro had left the cast before the show was renewed and does not appear in later seasons. Season 2 premiered on October 18, 2019, and the final season was released on April 23, 2020. A short film special called The House of Flowers Presents: The Funeral premiered on November 1, 2019, and a YouTube TV special was released on April 20, 2020. The first season is exclusively set in Mexico, while the second and third seasons also feature scenes in Madrid, and the funeral special has a scene set at the Texas-Mexico border.

It contains several LGBT+ main characters, with plots that look at homophobia and transphobia. Seen as satirizing the telenovela genre that it maintains elements of, it also subverts stereotypical presentations of race, class, sexuality, and morality in Mexico. Its genre has been described as a new creation, the "millennial telenovela", (Note: See in: Garrán, Reina, Palacios, Pascual García, and Motta.) a label supported by Caro and Suárez.

The show was generally critically well-received, also winning several accolades. Cecilia Suárez and her character, Paulina de la Mora, have been particularly praised; described as a Mexican pop icon, the character's voice has been the subject of popularity and discussion, leading into its use for the show's marketing. Aspects of the show have been compared to the work of Pedro Almodóvar, and it has been analyzed by various scholars, including Paul Julian Smith and Ramon Lobato.

A feature length film continuation, The House of Flowers: The Movie, premiered on Netflix on 23 June 2021.

== Synopsis ==
=== Season 1 ===
At the start of season 1, Ernesto de la Mora's mistress Roberta hangs herself; shortly afterwards, Ernesto is sent to prison because of fraud she committed in his name. The eldest de la Mora child, control freak Paulina, takes over their cabaret, butting heads with Roberta's son Claudio. The rest of the family had been kept in the dark for years, with matriarch Virginia shocked to find out about the cabaret, which bears the same name, 'La Casa de las Flores' ('The House of Flowers'), as her successful florists. Though keeping Ernesto's arrest a secret, the family's accounts are frozen and reputation damaged when youngest child, son Julián, chooses to come out as bisexual; all the while, middle daughter Elena has been awkwardly keeping her African-American fiancé Dominique away from the mess. Virginia caves and asks Paulina to call her lawyer ex-husband María José, who had been banished from the family for coming out as transgender.

Jealousy and anger cause Julián's boyfriend, family accountant Diego, to break up with him; Elena, scared of settling down, begins a relationship with Claudio and breaks up with Dominique just after their impromptu wedding. Paulina is told that Dr. Cohen, her childhood therapist, is her biological father, and starts visiting him and his sockpuppet assistant Chuy again. She also starts to fall for María José again. Meanwhile, Virginia has started selling homegrown marijuana, and Julián proposes introducing strippers to the cabaret, to raise money. Having finally raised enough money at the end of the season, it goes missing and it appears that Diego stole it. However, Ernesto is freed in time for the party. Virginia reveals she sold the florists to their rivals, the Chiquis, and tells Paulina to go after María José, before mysteriously leaving.

=== Season 2 ===
Eight months before the outset of season 2, shortly after the events of season 1, Virginia dies. After her funeral, the children part ways. Ernesto, overcome by grief, has joined a Scientology-esque scam cult, and a challenge to Virginia's long-awaited will brings the family back together, Paulina returning from Spain to take care of business. She wants to honor her mother, support her siblings, and get revenge on Diego; to do all three, she has to re-purchase the florists from the Chiquis. Diego reappears and buys the cabaret to earn her trust, also paying for the bills associated with the birth of Julián's child with ex Lucía. Paulina makes a sketchy deal with Julián's escort agency for the cabaret, pinning the deal to Diego. She also meets a mysterious Catalan man called Alejo, who says he was a friend to her mother while both were receiving cancer treatment, and gets close to him.

Julián reignites his relationship with Diego, and works a rentboy hustle in secret. Ernesto rises the ranks in his cult, and Micaéla enters the TV competition Talento México, taking Bruno as her guardian; Bruno has set his eyes on Rosita, a pretty teenage contestant. Elena is trying to manage her position as a senior architect while being increasingly distracted by men, and realizes she has a relationship addiction. María José finds happiness supporting the trans women and drag queens at the cabaret, though her relationship with Paulina fractures and she returns to Spain, being hounded by her overbearing sister Purificación. Paulina eventually accepts Diego's innocence and loyalty to her family, handing herself in to the police for the soliciting at the cabaret.

=== Season 3 ===
Paulina is threatened by different gangs in prison, including one led by the mysterious Chiva, and though Purificación has been sent as her attorney to work with local lawyer Kim, she wants to keep Paulina in prison. Elena is pregnant with Diego's child as a surrogate, and in a coma after her car wreck. Their grandmother, Victoria Aguirre, arrives to take over. Micaéla loses the final of Talento México to Rosita, but is invited to be part of a lip-sync group with her and Bruno. Alejo senses something wrong with Puri and calls María José, who comes to Mexico and has Paulina freed. Ernesto gives the cabaret to the drag queens. Diego is persuaded by his family to attend gay conversion therapy, to fulfill his dream of being a parent – when Julián realizes he wants children, he gets him out of therapy. When Elena wakes from her coma, Victoria tries to push the siblings apart, but they resist; Elena starts a relationship with former colleague Pablo. María José starts a relationship with Kim, while helping Paulina find out about Chiva.

In 1979, Virginia runs away to celebrate her birthday in Acapulco, taking LSD with Ernesto, Salomón, and gay best friend Pato. Salomón fails to perform when Virginia wants to lose her virginity, and she turns to Pato. At a drag bar, new neighbor Carmelita gets close to Ernesto, and Pato becomes a drag queen called Paulina. Virginia realizes she is pregnant and confides in Chiva, the nurse for her mysteriously ill father, who Victoria soon kills. She has Chiva sent to prison for a fake theft: Chiva told Pato about the murder. Pato and Virginia grow distant as he acts out, due to a secret relationship with the closeted Agustín, whom Victoria wants Virginia to marry. At the engagement party Agustín and his friends gay bash Pato, killing him. Virginia is distraught; Ernesto, not wanting his friend to be trapped with Agustín, breaks up with Carmelita and proposes to Virginia.

In 2019, Puri gets committed after becoming completely delusional, while Paulina and María José get close again as they interrogate the good and bad in their past relationships; Alejo leaves when he see them kiss. Ernesto tells Paulina that her real father was Pato, and the women learn about Pato before telling Chiva and being able to free her. She warns them to get Victoria away from the family. Victoria's rudeness makes Delia turn antagonistic through the season, resulting in a confrontation where Victoria falls and dies just after Chiva's warning. Julián, Diego, Elena, and Pablo decide to share the new baby, whom they name Pato. Paulina proposes to María José; with Puri seeming to improve, they tell her about the wedding, but she breaks out of hospital to kill Paulina. However, the spirit of Virginia stops her just in time.

== Cast ==
Several cast lists have been published by both Netflix and media outlets; cast lists are also found in the credits of each episode. (Note: Lists and interviews detailing cast and characters can be found across several sources: Netflix/Netflix Latinoamérica, Revista Central, CNET, El Heraldo de México, Las Estrellas TV, 20minutos, SensaCine, La Nación, Metro Ecuador, Infobae, El Universal, and Caras.)

The show revolves around the de la Mora family. Matriarch Virginia de la Mora, the face of the shop, is played by Verónica Castro in season 1 and by Isabel Burr in season 3. Cecilia Suárez plays Paulina de la Mora, Virginia's eldest daughter, a neurotic type with a distinctive speech pattern who becomes the main character after season 1, and Paco León plays her partner María José Riquelme, a passionate Spanish trans woman who is also the family lawyer. The other children are Aislinn Derbez as Elena de la Mora, the middle child who returns home from New York at the start of the show and gets wrapped back up in the family mess, and Darío Yazbek Bernal as Julián de la Mora, the beloved but dependent youngest child, who is bisexual and dating family accountant Diego, played by Juan Pablo Medina.

Arturo Ríos plays their quiet father, Ernesto de la Mora (also portrayed by Tiago Correa in season 3), who has been keeping a semi-secret second family with lover Roberta, played by Claudette Maillé. Roberta has an adult son from a previous relationship, the simple Claudio, played by Lucas Velázquez. The next generation of the family includes Roberta and Ernesto's young daughter, Micaéla, played by Alexa de Landa, and Paulina and María José's teenage son Bruno, played by Luis de la Rosa. Crazy aunt Purificación Riquelme is played by María León. The family psychiatrist, and Virginia's ex, Salomón Cohen, is played by David Ostrosky and Javier Jattin, and Paulina's gay drag queen father Patricio is played by Christian Chávez. Family maid and confidante Delia is played by Norma Angélica and Maya Mazariegos, while their nosy but kind-hearted neighbor Carmelita is played by Verónica Langer and Ximena Sariñana. Virginia's own manipulative and murderous mother, Victoria Aguirre, is played by Isela Vega and Rebecca Jones.

Actor	Character	Appearances			
Actor	Character	Season 1	Season 2	El Funeral	Season 3
Main characters
Verónica Castro	Virginia de la Mora Aguirre	Main	(Note: The likeness of Castro as Virginia appears in the second and third seasons, and El Funeral, though she did not work for the show beyond season 1 and the use of her likeness is uncredited.)		
Isabel Burr	Virginia de la Mora Aguirre		(Note: Burr, Jattin and Correa appear in a photograph in season 2.)		Main (Note: This portrayal is part of the 1979 storyline.)
Cecilia Suárez	Paulina de la Mora	Main	Main	Main	Main
Aislinn Derbez	Elena de la Mora	Main	Main	Main	Main
Darío Yazbek Bernal	Julián de la Mora	Main	Main	Main	Main
Paco León	María José Riquelme Torres (Note: In an episode of season 1, Paco León also portrays the pre-transition José María.)	Main	Main	Main	Main
Juan Pablo Medina	Diego Olvera	Main	Main	Main	Main
Luis de la Rosa	Bruno Riquelme de la Mora	Main	Main	Guest	Main
Arturo Ríos	Ernesto de la Mora	Main	Main	Guest	Main
Tiago Correa	Ernesto de la Mora				Main
Verónica Langer	Carmela "Carmelita" Villalobos	Main	Main	Guest	Main
Ximena Sariñana	Carmela "Carmelita" Villalobos				Main
Lucas Velázquez	Claudio Navarro	Main	Main	Guest	Main
Norma Angélica	Delia	Main	Main	Guest	Main
Maya Mazariegos	Delia				Recurring
David Ostrosky	Dr. Salomón Cohen	Main	Main	Guest	Main
Javier Jattin	Dr. Salomón Cohen				Main
Alexa de Landa	Micaéla Sánchez	Main	Main	Guest	Main
Sheryl Rubio	Lucía Dávila	Main	Main	Guest	
Claudette Maillé	Roberta Navarro	Main	Recurring (Note: Narration only.)	Guest	Recurring (Note: Maillé's narration as Roberta in season 3 is credited as recurring; her physical portrayal in the final episode is credited as a special appearance.)
Sawandi Wilson	Dominique Shaw	Main		Guest	
Natasha Dupeyrón	Ana Paula "La Chiquis" Corcuera	Recurring	Main	Guest	Main
Paco Rueda	Agustín "El Chiquis" Corcuera Jr. (Note: In earlier cast lists, El Chiquis is named 'José Raúl'. In season 3, it is revealed his name is Agustín Junior.)	Recurring	Main	Guest	Main
Eduardo Rosa	Alejo Salvat		Main		Main
Loreto Peralta	Rosita		Main		Main
Mariana Treviño	Jenny Quetzal		Main		Recurring
Flavio Medina	Simón		Main		Guest
Anabel Ferreira	Celeste		Main		
María León	Purificación Riquelme		Recurring		Main
Isela Vega	Victoria Aguirre		Guest		Main
Rebecca Jones	Victoria Aguirre				Main
Christian Chávez	Patricio "Pato" Lascuráin				Main
Cristina Umaña	Kim				Main
Emilio Cuaik	Agustín "Asustin" Corcuera				Main
Recurring characters
Ismael Rodríguez	Jorge "Amanda Miguel"	Recurring	Recurring	Guest	Recurring
Pepe Marquez	Pepe "Paulina Rubio"	Recurring	Recurring	Guest	Recurring
Katia Balmori	Mario "Yuri"	Recurring	Recurring	Guest	Recurring
Mariana Santos	Gloria "Gloria Trevi"	Recurring	Recurring	Guest	Recurring
Irving Peña	Alfonso "Poncho" Cruz	Recurring	Recurring	Guest	Recurring
Michel Frías	Moisés Cohen	Recurring	Recurring	Guest	
Hugo Catalán	Oliver	Recurring	Recurring	Guest	
Ruth Ovseyevitz	Dora Cohen	Recurring	Recurring	Guest	
David Chaviras	El Cacas	Recurring	Recurring		Guest
Alexis Ortega	Dr. Federico "DJ Freddy" Limantour	Recurring		Guest	Recurring
Elizabeth Guindi	Angélica	Recurring		Guest	
Catalina López	Angélica				Recurring
Andrea Sisniega	La Beba	Recurring		Guest	
	La Beba				Recurring
Amanda Farah	Funeral home worker	Recurring			Recurring
Federico Espejo	Willy	Recurring			
Sofía Sisniega	Mara	Recurring			
Roberto Quijano	Luka	Recurring			
Felipe Flores	Lalo	Recurring			
Francisco de la Reguera	Juanpi	Recurring			
Roberto Flores	Pablo Pérez		Recurring		Recurring
Regina Orozco	Rosita's mother		Recurring		Guest
Teresa Ruiz	Marilu		Recurring		
Eugenio Montessoro	Sr. Olvera		Guest		Recurring
Paloma Woolrich	Sra. Olvera		Guest		Recurring
Stephanie Salas	"Tatis" Corcuera				Recurring
Valeria Vera	Sandro				Recurring
Valentina	Herself				Recurring
Luisa Huertas	Silvia "Chiva" López				Recurring
Olivia Lagunas	Silvia "Chiva" López				Recurring
Darío T. Pie	Dr. Meneses				Recurring
Ricardo Polanco	Fercito				Recurring
Mauricio Barrientos	Xavier				Recurring
Guest characters
Manolo Caro	News anchor		Guest		Guest
Eduardo Casanova	Edu		Guest		
Gloria Trevi	Herself		Guest		
Salvador Pineda	Mauricio Pollo		Guest		
Fernando Sarfatti	Carlos			Guest	
Isabel Aerenlund	Naty			Guest	
Sophie Gómez	Daniela			Guest	
Kwang Soo	Junichiro			Guest	
Jorge Zárate	Warden Ortega				Guest
Ramiro Fumazoni	Martín				Guest
Pedro Sola	Henry				Guest
Lucía Uribe	Virginia's school friend				Guest
Pablo Ruiz	Yeko				Guest
Latin Lover	Don Porno				Guest
Paz Vega	Carmelita's mother				Guest (Note: Paz Vega appears in a semi-fantasy sequence, and her character's voice is provided by Karla Delfín.)
Miguel Bosé	Vicar				Guest
Leticia Dolera	Witness (María José's cousin) (Note: The familial relationship is established in the tie-in "La Boda de las Flores".)				Guest
Cast notes

== Production ==
=== Development and themes ===
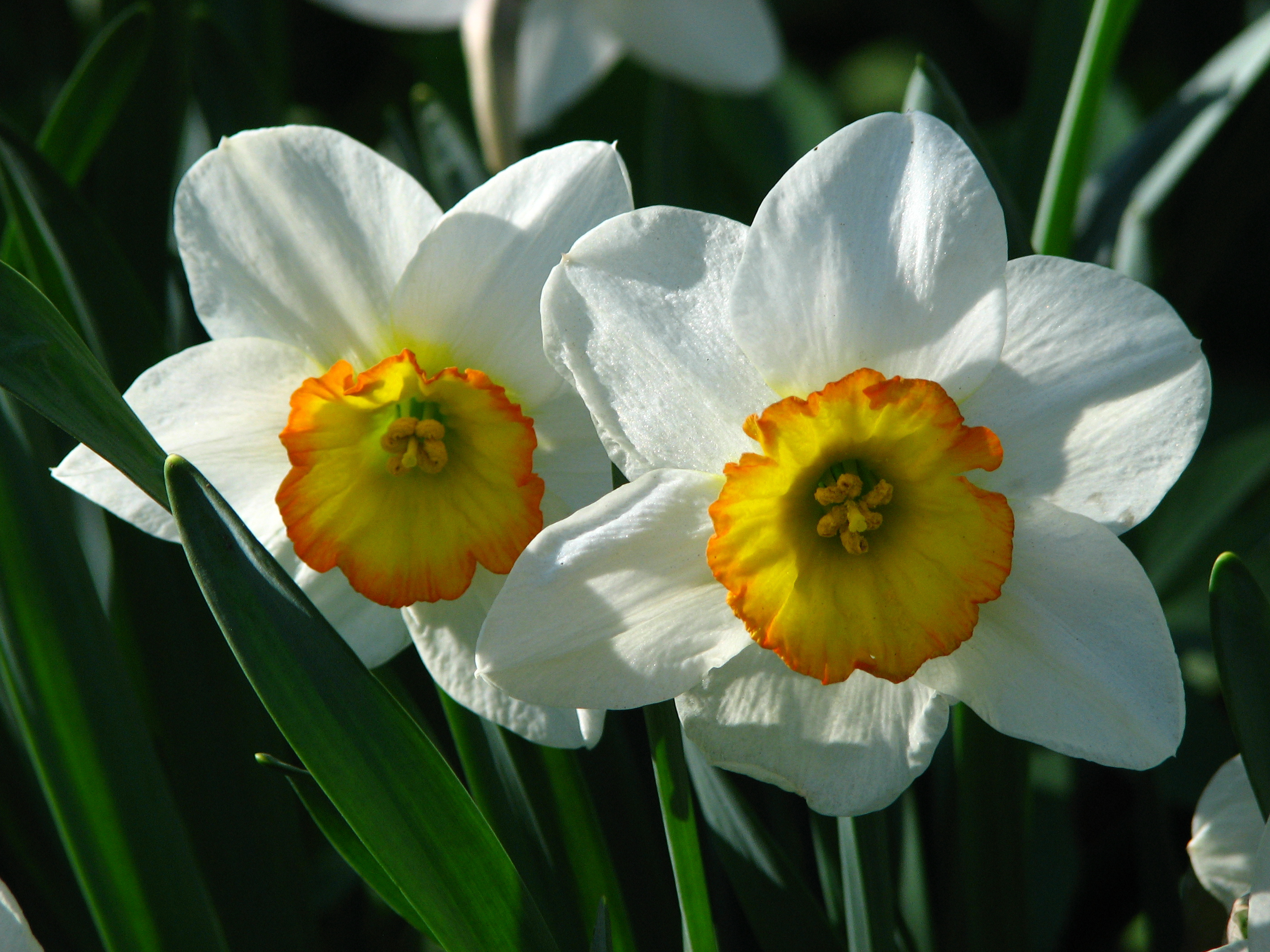
A narcissus flower; symbolizing lies, this flower is the title of the first episode.

A new Netflix original series to be created by Caro was announced in October 2016, with the title and the principal cast being announced in January 2017. The House of Flowers was the third Mexican Netflix original series, after Club de Cuervos and Ingobernable, and the first television series that Caro has made. A second and third season of the series were announced in October 2018. On May 9, 2019, Caro signed an exclusive deal with Netflix, signing on to create more shows for the streaming service; he became only the second Spanish-speaking showrunner to receive such a deal. Caro has said that the show is something "that can only exist on Netflix", (Note: Spanish: "que solo puede existir en Netflix") noting the themes and plots of contemporaneous telenovelas produced for Mexican television as being homophobic, macho, and perpetuating violence against women. The show has been described as "a deconstruction or satire of Latin American telenovelas", (Note: Spanish: "una deconstrucción o sátira manifiesta de las telenovelas latinoamericanas") and Catenacci notes that, in comparison to some telenovela episodes that contain over 300 references to domestic abuse, this series' episodes are named for flowers.

Thematically, the show explores some cultural issues within Mexican society, including casual racism and homophobia and the country's class diversity, with the contrasting House of Flowers establishments used to illustrate the socio-economic and racial divides in modern-day Mexico City, and to introduce discussions of the ethics behind money. Beyond these themes, the show is driven by the overarching concept of family, with actress Suárez describing it as the main focus. Juego de series has suggested the show also focuses on the idea that things kept secret are not necessarily as bad as the secret-keeper thinks they are. On the theme of social facade, Suárez has said that "lies are a recurrent element in all of Manolo [Caro]'s work right from his first short. The idea of pretending to be one thing and saying another is something that obsesses him". The second season also includes more complex discussions around sex, and the third season features more prominent themes of transgender and bisexual identities. Romero says that the central theme of the final season is "forgiving, and celebrating, the complicated character of Virginia de la Mora".

In August 2018, Castro announced that she would not reprise the role of Virginia for potential future seasons because she felt that her "character's journey is over", with Caro later confirming the amicable departure and explaining that should the show be renewed, it would focus on the de la Mora children. As the second season began releasing promotional materials, Castro confirmed that her likeness was used, but she had not been involved. Without Castro as the lead, reviewers saw that "the closest thing the wildly entertaining comedy has to a central character now" was Cecilia Suárez's Paulina, who steps up to take control of things and who was already a fan favorite.

Caro explained in 2019 that the writers had previously outlined the stories for the children independent of Virginia, knowing Castro was only contracted for one season; he also said that exploring how the family works without the matriarch's presence is an important topic. In 2019, some of the production moved to Netflix's new Madrid headquarters, with development split between Spain and Mexico. On February 25, 2020, Netflix announced that the third season would be the show's last; Caro said that the production had expected only three seasons if it went well, and that he had planned the ending of the series when he was first writing it in 2017, but that he would leave the door open for a return to the show. The third season incorporates a story from 1979, which Caro said he had two reasons for including: he is a big fan of shows from the time, and he wanted a way to bring back Virginia de la Mora.

=== Casting and characterization ===
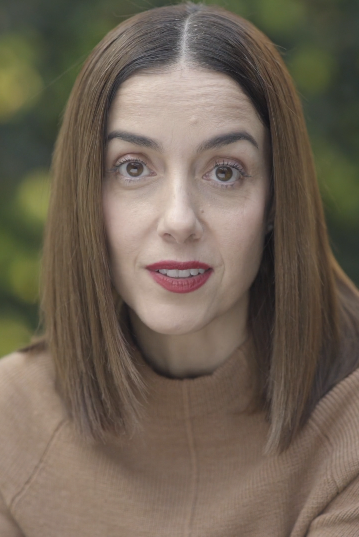
Cecilia Suárez plays lead and fan favorite character Paulina de la Mora

The casting of Verónica Castro, referred to as "Mexican telenovela royalty", was seen by Manuel Betancourt to be a real achievement on the part of creator Manolo Caro, who in effect was "getting her out of retirement" to make the show. Castro has said that getting back into acting with the show helped her mental health.

Cecilia Suárez had acted in numerous other works created by Caro before playing Paulina. The character has been critiqued as a perfect fit for the show because she has "a personality that justifies going from drama to involuntary comedy", (Note: Spanish: "La Suárez deja su acartonamiento habitual y su zona de confort para regalarnos un personaje enigmático, carismático y entrañable. [...] A ella sí le creemos lo que al resto del elenco no: una personalidad que justifica ir del drama a la comedia involuntaria con una fluidez que se goza".) with the same review suggesting that Suárez had to "leave her comfort zone" to play Paulina, but does so successfully. Caro has said that he thought Paulina would be "polarizing" when he wrote her, that people would either love her or hate her, not expecting the popularity she received. The concept of second chances is the "backbone" (Note: Spanish: "la columna vertebral") of Paulina's character, according to Suárez, who said in 2019 that Caro had concerned himself with this concept through the first two seasons. Going into the show's sophomore season, Vogue described Suárez as "the new queen of the telenovela". (Note: Spanish: "la nueva reina del culebrón")

Cisgender actor Paco León, who plays trans woman María José Riquelme, said that the production wanted to create a non-stereotypical trans character in his role, with Caro saying that he thinks media needs to "demystify" (Note: Spanish: "desmitificar") real people from LGBT+ stereotypes. León mentioned in interviews that he did not know why a trans actress was not cast, and that he understood the controversy of his casting; Caro explained that he wanted León for the role because of the actor's own work to create more visibility and opportunities for LGBT+ people in entertainment. After the show aired, it was reported that trans people had warmed to the character, and particularly her line: "I had a change of sex, not of heart". (Note: Spanish: "Me cambié de sexo, no de corazón") Though León's portrayal was accepted, the actor said that he will not accept more trans roles so as to promote more trans actors, but would continue as María José in the show.

León also commented on the use of María José's characterization, with her being a trans woman, as part of the show's narrative arc, saying that "[she] goes by the rejection she receives, but throughout the series you realize that she is the most sane and focused, is emotionally more stable, her mental balance is greater than the rest of the family's. This is how you discover that the characters that apparently have a perfect life and are socially accepted are the ones with the most emotional problems." (Note: Spanish: "Mi personaje se va por el rechazo que recibe, pero a lo largo de la serie te das cuenta de que es la más cuerda y centrada, es emocionalmente más estable, su equilibrio mental es mayor al resto de la familia. Es así como descubres que los personajes que aparentemente tienen una vida perfecta y son socialmente aceptados son los que tienen más problemas emocionales y [mentales].")

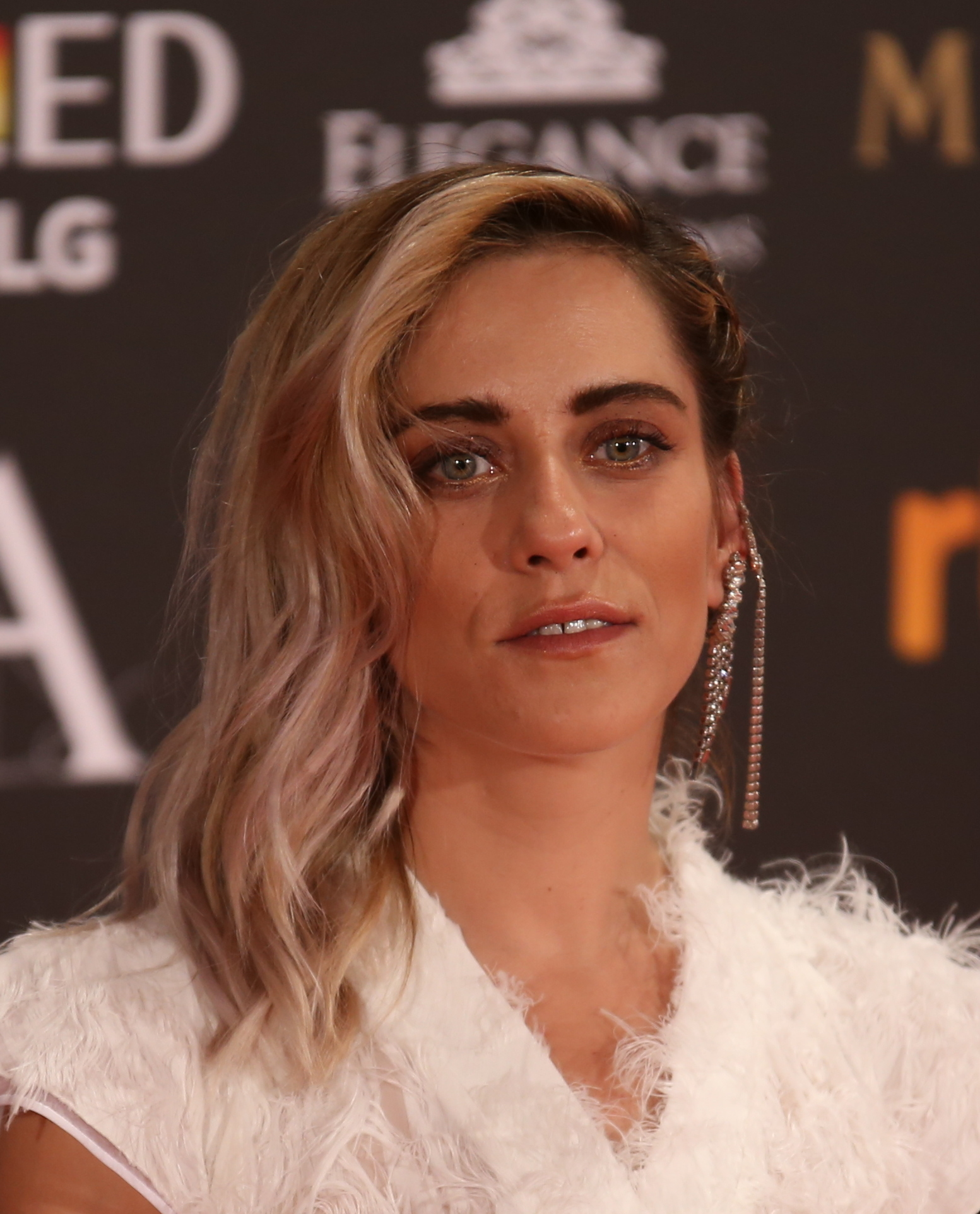
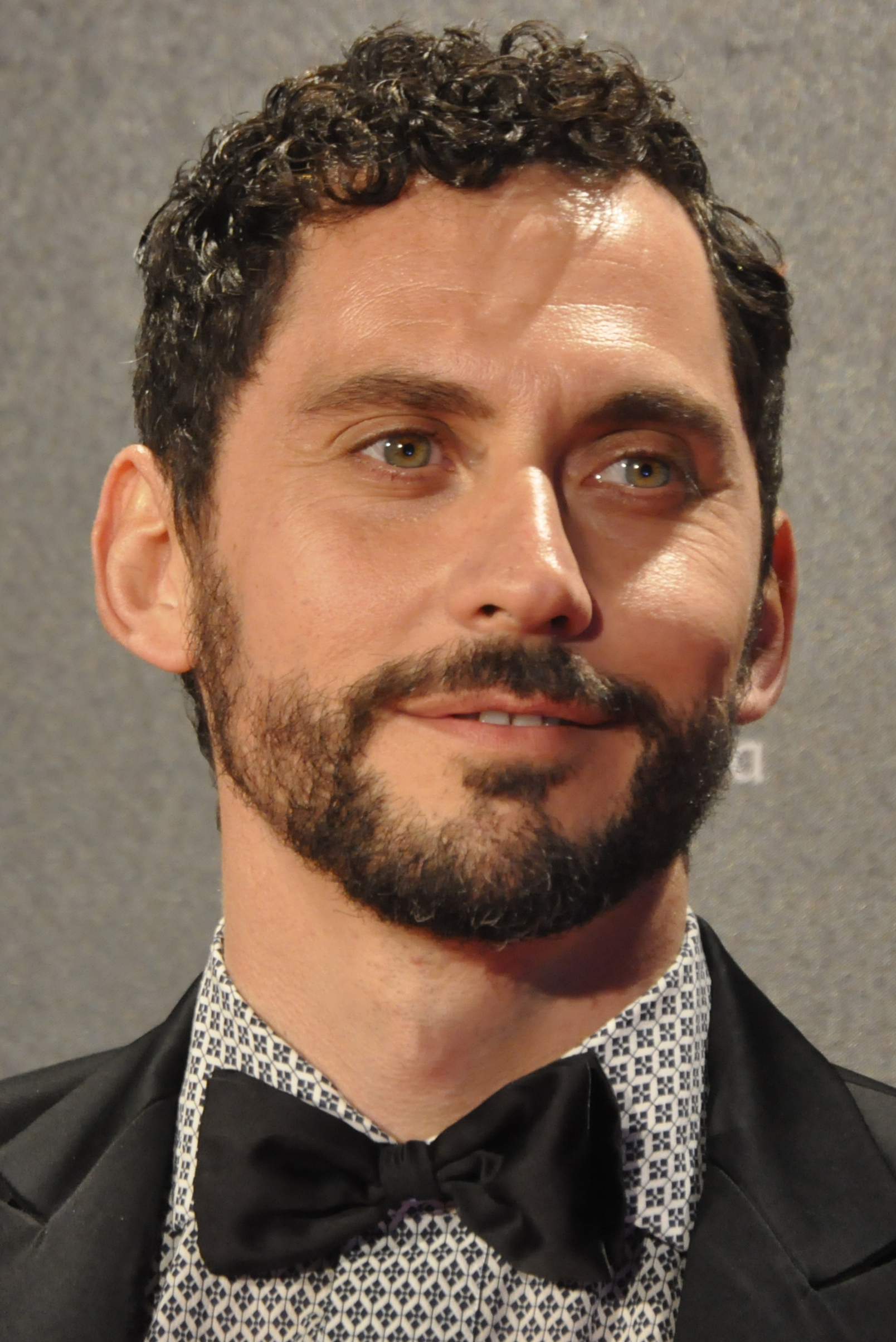
Spanish siblings María and Paco León play the Riquelme sisters on the show

In an interview, León said that he was enthusiastic when offered the role, that he "shaved [his] legs and started to be María José", (Note: Spanish: "Me depilé las piernas y comencé a ser María José") flying to Mexico straight away; he did, though, lament having to clean-shave his face every day and take painkillers to deal with wearing bras and heels. In terms of his approach to playing María José, he also affirmed that he "left the comedy behind" (Note: Spanish: "renuncié aquí a la comicidad") from when he had played female characters before in impersonation show Homo Zapping, treating the role seriously. In October 2019, León confirmed that he was appearing in season 3 of the show, joking that it was becoming the "longest cameo ever"; (Note: Spanish: "el cameo más largo de la historia de la televisión") his role was supposed to be a cameo of "only fifteen minutes", (Note: Spanish: "apenas quince minutos") first discussed in a casual mention when meeting with Caro.

For season 2, actress María León was cast as Purificación Riquelme, the sister of María José. The casting was praised by Spanish media for using the real sister of María José's actor, suggesting that beyond looking alike, the siblings have very noticeable light-colored eyes and it would not have made sense to cast somebody else when María León is also an accomplished actor. Casting for season 2 was announced as it began filming, first on February 5 with Spanish cast members, and then with Mexican actors on February 18. David Chaviras also returned as the popular character El Cacas in season 2, with a larger role.

On March 6, 2020, it was revealed that season 3 would have a "completely new cast", (Note: Spanish: "un elenco completamente nuevo") featuring actors playing younger versions of many of the established characters. Christian Chávez was reported as part of the third season's cast in December 2019, with his character announced in April 2020, before the final season premiered, with a story and identity that the actor thought was interesting and important, as well as a challenge.

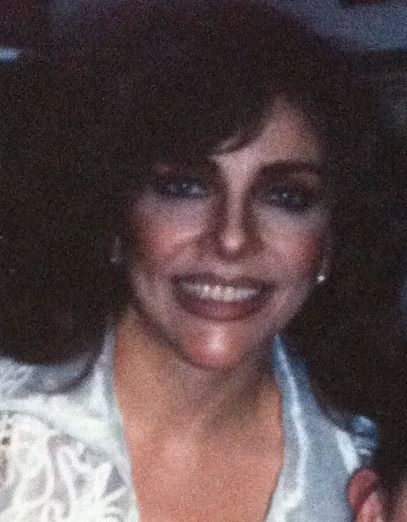
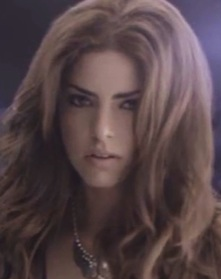
Isabel Burr (right) looks similar to a young Verónica Castro (left); the actresses play Virginia de la Mora at different ages.

Chilean actor Tiago Correa as young Ernesto had been announced in November 2019, and he had appeared in a photograph with young Virginia and Salomón in the final episode of season 2; on March 6, 2020, Isabel Burr and Javier Jattin were revealed as the young Virginia and Salomón, with Ximena Sariñana's involvement being announced, too. Burr has previously portrayed Castro herself, in the 2016 biopic Hasta que te conocí. The casting for the young Virginia involved Verónica Castro look-alike actresses, searching for actors that looked and felt like the older characters.

The appearances of actors returning for the third season were confirmed by Caro through a series of posts on Instagram in November 2019, and more new castings being confirmed in early 2020. Miguel Bosé, who has a cameo in the final episode, had been asked by Caro to take part four days before the scene was shot; Caro had previously discussed the show with Bosé and his mother, Lucia Bosè, who were "super fans".

=== Filming ===
Principal photography for the series began on July 24, 2017. The main House of Flowers and de la Mora house sets are in San Andrés Totoltepec, a small town in the Tlalpan region near the edge of Mexico City. Filming for season 1 was halted for several weeks in September and October 2017 after the 2017 Puebla earthquake. The show was filming in Condesa as the quake happened and production stopped while waiting for the filming locations to be stabilized. Suárez was also injured in the earthquake and could not return to set for a month after production resumed. Season 1 finished filming at the end of November 2017.

Season 2 filming began in early February 2019, with production in Spain from February 5, and ended on July 9, 2019. Parts of the second season were filmed on location in Madrid in February 2019. Season 2 filming in Mexico largely took place in a nineteenth-century house in Condesa. The second and third seasons were filmed at the same time. Some of season 3 had been filmed in April 2019, while main photography for it began in June 2019. In October 2019, Caro announced that the third season had already wrapped up production.

=== Music ===
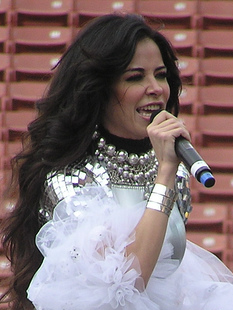
Mexican singer Gloria Trevi features in the series' soundtrack and appears in a cameo role in season 2.

The series' music supervisor was Lynn Fainchtein and the composer was Yamil Rezc; both previously worked with Caro on Tales of an Immoral Couple. Fainchtein explained that since a lot of teamwork is involved with film and television music production, she tries to only work with people she knows, having produced music for Caro for many years. Caro told iHeartRadio that "music became an important part of The House of Flowers, because, what is a funeral without Pau singing 'muévelo, muévelo, qué sabroso'?" (Note: Spanish: "La música se convirtió en parte importante de La casa de las Flores, porque, ¿qué sería de un funeral sin la Pau cantando 'muévelo, muévelo, qué sabroso'?")

Rezc composed the series' theme, also called "La Casa de las Flores", as well as its incidental music. Working closely with Caro for the show, Rezc has been described as "the specialist who identifies [from Caro's story] the best cues to dress the scene or sequence". (Note: Spanish: "Aunque las historias provienen de la mente de Manolo, Yamil Rezc funciona como el especialista que define cuáles son las mejores pistas para vestir alguna escena o secuencia.") Rezc's opening theme was described by music critic Julián Téllez as a "magnificent opening curtain that is like the introduction to a tale", (Note: Spanish: "una magnífica cortinilla de inicio que parece la introducción a un cuento") which was Caro's intention; the director said that "the story had to have a certain amount of fantasy" (Note: Spanish: "la historia necesitaba tener cierto grado de fantasía") so that it could still be intense with its blend of realistic aspects.

Caro uses a lot of eighties hits in his works, with much of the background music used in The House of Flowers coming from this era. There are also songs across different eras and genres, curated by Caro, Fainchtein, and Rezc, including ballads and dance tracks by Selena, Yuri, Mecano, and Gloria Trevi; a Christian Castro song is also used, being sung over by Virginia – who is played by Verónica Castro, Christian's mother. Additionally, Fainchtein and Rezc looked into new and emerging musical talent for their selections. One of the music choices led to an accidental tribute; in the season 2 finale, Alexa de Landa as Micaéla performs a cover of the José José song "El Triste", with José having died shortly before the season's release, in September 2019.

In the third season, more music from the seventies, thanks to part of the story being set in 1979, was used. Described as "unforgettable" (Note: Spanish: "inolvidable") and "memorable", the music includes María Daniela y su Sonido Lasser, Baccara, Boney M., and Leo Dan. Billboard's Griselda Flores said the third season's song choices "capture the zeitgeist of the 1970s in Mexico". Fainchtein said that acquiring some of the music was difficult because not all Spanish music from the seventies is easily cleared for use, and some is not well registered to allow this. She told Billboard how the team had to be creative when they found songs that were perfect for scenes but could not be used, though she had already done a lot of research into seventies Spanish music when serving as the music supervisor for Roma, which was also set in this decade. As well as adding the seventies music to the third season, Fainchtein explained that the music team tried to create a continuity by re-using background music from the earlier seasons.

=== Family portraits ===
The large portraits of the de la Mora family that hang in the atrium of the house are used as plot points in the show, and versions of the artwork for each season are animated in their respective title sequences. The oil-on-canvas portraits were created by the Mexican-American surrealist painter Roberta Lobeira. The portrait for the first season is a work called Retrato de una familia normal (English: Portrait of a Normal Family), the art for the second season is called La vida después de ti (English: Life After You), and the portrait for the final season is called El final del cuento (English: The End of the Tale). Caro kept the third season's portrait and producer Rafael Ley kept the second season's, despite a collector wanting to buy it from them.

Vogue's Eugenia González de Henn writes that the portraits contain elements of magical realism, a consistent theme in Lobeira's work. Lobeira has known Suárez "all [her] life" (Note: Spanish: "toda la vida") and had worked with Caro and Ley before, on the film No sé si cortarme las venas o dejármelas largas; she said that she had been told before the commission that they may ask to use some of her work in a Netflix show, and she was moved by this but did not understand the reach and power of the platform at the time. In terms of inspiration, Lobeira said that she "likes to follow a wave, that [she] gets caught up in a character and then expresses it in a magical world", (Note: Spanish: "me gusta que saque de onda, que me atrape el personaje y que se exprese en un mundo mágico") and so she got to know the characters to "capture [their] essence": (Note: Spanish: "captar la esencia") before she designed the first portrait, she was sent character descriptions and a synopsis of the story. She said that the third portrait is her favorite, because by the time she made it she already knew the characters very well and could take more inspiration from them, and because the poses were fun.

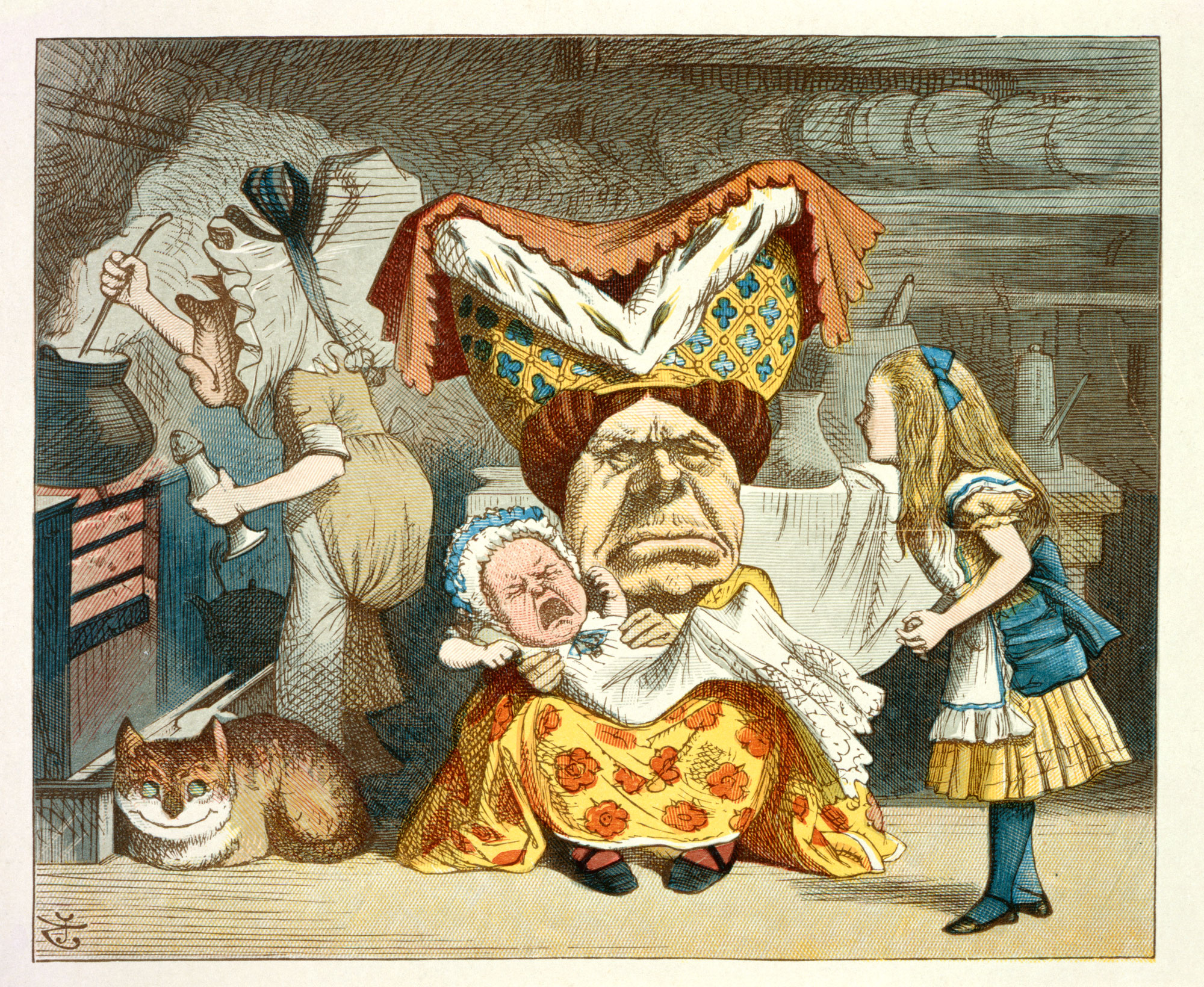
Illustration by John Tenniel from The Nursery "Alice": the surrealist imagery of Alice in Wonderland inspired the family portrait.

With Retrato de una familia normal, González asserted that Lobeira "facilitated the illusion" (Note: Spanish: "la ilusión se le facilitó") of a perfect family but also revealed a double life; she notes the imagery of Paulina having blue blood and Virginia being dressed in gold with a crown, and Julián having a double face while Ernesto's is ripped in two. Lobeira said that the piece was inspired by Alice in Wonderland, and also pointed out that every character but Virginia is dressed in black. The portrait was her largest work at the time, measuring 1.9 m × 3 m (6.2 ft × 9.8 ft), and was completed in less than a month. Lobeira would work for up to sixteen hours a day on it. According to her, the image of Julián – intentionally in black and white – was the hardest to paint, because each reference photo she was sent of Yazbek Bernal had a different expression, while Ernesto was a challenge because Ríos had not yet been cast when she started work.

Lobeira also had little time to work on the La vida después de ti portrait for the second season, and told Quién that Caro would often ask for things to be changed during the design of the portrait, which they worked on together. Some of the imagery in this portrait includes Paulina smoking a churro with planets coming out of the smoke – Lobeira says this reflects how the character "lives in another world" (Note: Spanish: "vive en otro mundo") – and a book on the head of María José because of her position as a lawyer. It also shows Julián with a banner saying "Lust" and a puppet of Diego, and Paulina's chest has pills inside. The hardest part of the portrait was the image of Bruno and Rosita on a carousel, with the Rosita figure being about 3 cm (1.2 in) high. Within an hour of the new portrait being shared on social media by Netflix Latinoamérica it had been viewed over 6,000 times.

The third season portrait, measuring 1.8 m × 2.8 m (5.9 ft × 9.2 ft), was also completed in about three weeks. Lobeira said that even though Caro was still a demanding partner, she managed to get her ideas through and planned all the details and the tones of the portrait. Caleb Torres García for Quién wrote that the imagery shows Paulina as the "matriarch and martyr" (Note: Spanish: "matriarca y mártir") because she is positioned in the center and decorated like a saint. He also noted that it shows a pregnant Diego; María José with a mask of another woman; an elegant-looking Ernesto with a 'door' in his face, suggesting this character will find a new romance; Elena styled like the character Snow White, suggesting someone will try to poison her and referencing her coma; Delia with flowers springing from her, suggesting she is the one who is committed to floristry; Bruno covered in honey and Rosita with her head in a fish bowl; and a reference to Diego's hometown of Celaya, Guanajuato, with the frogs.

In October 2018, Carmen Melgar of El País said that the de la Mora family portrait was "one of the most-viewed paintings in the world in the last few months". (Note: Spanish: "uno de los cuadros más vistos en el mundo en los últimos meses") Harper's Bazaar wrote that the show's "extremely picturesque" (Note: Spanish: "sumamente pintoresco") style was eye-catching from the first episode, and that the family portrait stuck out in particular, while Denisse Marina of San Diego Red said that the portraits are "a fundamental part of the aesthetics of the series". (Note: Spanish: "parte fundamental de la estética de la serie")

== Episodes ==
Series overview
Season	Episodes	Originally released
1	13	August 10, 2018
2	9	October 18, 2019
Special		November 1, 2019
3	11	April 23, 2020

== Release and marketing ==
=== Broadcast ===
The full 13-episode first season was released on Netflix on August 10, 2018. Season 2 premiered on October 18, 2019, and season 3 was released on April 23, 2020. La Verdad wrote that the release date of the third season was earlier than expected, and suggested this may be due to the COVID-19 pandemic lockdowns. On Día de Muertos (November 1) 2019, a surprise special episode was released showing the funeral of Virginia, after references to the event through season 2 were popular among viewers. This episode also connects other plot points from the second season. The funeral episode was released as a special separate to the main series collection on Netflix, listed as a film. On April 10, 2020, Netflix announced that a TV special starring the cast as well as critics would be released on YouTube on 420 (April 20); Mexican TV critic Álvaro Cueva described the TV special as "a parody of what the big telenovela finale specials of yesteryear had been". (Note: Spanish: "es una parodia de lo que eran los grandes especiales de los finales telenoveleros de antaño")

In its first week of broadcast, the second season was watched by 6,219,547 accounts, from across the world; it became the top viewed show on Netflix in several Spanish-speaking countries and broke a Mexican record for viewership of a second season. The series ended 2019 as the second most-watched show on Netflix in Mexico. Scholar Paul Julian Smith, though, was worried about the international and streaming success distorting the views of its importance, suggesting that nationally-broadcast telenovelas play a more important role in everyday Mexican life, especially noting that many Mexican homes cannot regularly access the internet to view Netflix.

Interviewed in early 2020, between the release of the second and third seasons, Paco León said that he thought the show's second season was "inconsistent", but had its good moments, while saying that the third season will be "acojonante" ("fucking amazing"). By April 2020, before the premiere of the final season, the show was the eighth most-watched Netflix series in Mexico. Within hours of the final season's release, the series was the number one most-watched on Netflix in Mexico.

=== Multimedia marketing ===
Before the first season was released, a trailer for the series debuted on June 12, 2018.

The release date of season 2 was announced on August 15, 2019, in a tweet that also showed the new family portrait; the season's marketing had begun earlier in the month with videos using Paulina's voice. These included Paulina leaving a threatening voicemail in the style of Taken; a WhatsApp voice note where she announced the character of Virginia had died, with the hashtag "#QDEPVirginiaDeLaMora" ("RIP Virginia de la Mora"); and an ASMR video recap made by the character. The first official trailer was released on September 23, showing scenes from the first episode in both Madrid and Mexico City. A press tour for season 2 was held a few weeks before it was released to Netflix.

Some of the show's posters were critically discussed. Left: Imitating conservative messages, drag queens from the show are pictured with "This is a sin ... we put on heels and you can't even see them" written across the poster. Right: The season 3 poster has been positively critiqued based on its reference to the related trailer and its own artistic style.

Shortly before the second season aired, promotional posters were launched in a campaign mocking those of conservative Mexican groups, particularly the National Front for the Family, which has criticized the show. The posters feature slogans which satirize homophobic and transphobic ones, including an image of trans character María José and her partner Paulina accompanied by "This is not natural ... we are obviously wearing make-up", among others. This campaign was run with the hashtag "#NoTeMetasConMiFamilia" ("Don't Mess With My Family"), playing on the National Front's own campaign. Ana Carolina, writing for UniCable, noted that the campaign was embraced by fans but also prompted surprise across Mexico because of how explicitly it attacked the intolerance of the National Front. The posters were discussed at the 2019 Huelva International Film Festival in relation to social media and marketing influencing the public view of films, particularly in terms of social criticism.

The only marketing for the surprise funeral episode came shortly after its release to the platform, in a tweet from Manolo Caro; it also has its own Netflix poster. The third and final season's first teaser trailer was released on March 6, 2020, set in 1979. On March 17, 2020, Netflix shared the opening title sequence for the final season, and announced the release date as April 23, 2020. The final trailer was released on April 2, 2020, picking back up with the original main cast from the end of the second season. Ashley Falls of Clio Entertainment examined the marketing for the third season, writing that the "bold typography[,] floral full-frame graphics [and] groovy music" of the trailer made every second of it work, and that the "color scheme and floral pattern" of the poster matched graphics with the video. She also noted that the combination of these poster graphics with its "family portrait and mural-like illustration" made it "remarkable".

A virtual press junket was held in the days leading up to the release of the final season, with the cast completing many video interviews (Note: Including for: Homosensual, Jim & Peregrina for BadHombre, López for Glamour, PepeyTeo, Perea for Quién, Ponzo, Poza, Revista Moi, Sosa, Telemundo, and Tovar Pulido for Imagen Entertainment.) or interviewing over the phone, and answering fan questions live in a moderated livestream discussion called "La Fiesta de las Flores", which took place from 8:00pm in Mexico City (CDT/UTC−05:00) on April 23. Suárez pre-recorded a message for "La Fiesta de las Flores" from Madrid (where the time zone was CEST/UTC+02:00). At the end of the stream, Caro announced that at midnight that night, the show's soundtrack would be released for purchase. Another video-based interaction for the show happened shortly after its end: on April 26, a social media 'wedding reception' was held, with cut scenes and behind the scenes images shared on Instagram, and fans invited to dress up and celebrate at home.

=== Soundtrack ===
La Música Que Inspiró La Serie Original De Netflix, La Casa De Las Flores (Creada por Manolo Caro)

Soundtrack album by Various Artists
- Released: April 24, 2020
- Genre: Pop latino
- Length: 81:31
- Label: Universal Music Mexico

A soundtrack for the series, called "La Música Que Inspiró La Serie Original De Netflix, La Casa De Las Flores (Creada por Manolo Caro)" (English: "The Music That Inspired The Original Netflix Series, La Casa De Las Flores (Created by Manolo Caro)"), was released on April 24, 2020, by Universal Music Mexico, available for digital download on Apple Music and iTunes, Spotify, YouTube Music and Deezer.

Two of the songs on the soundtrack are original to the series: the main theme by Yamil Rezc, and the "El Triste" cover by Alexa de Landa, which she performed as character Micaéla in the second season.

Líder Informativo said that the soundtrack compilation was a greatest hits list, including tracks from the eighties through to contemporary music and covers.

Track listing
No.	Title	Writer(s)	Artist(s)	Length
1.	"La Casa de las Flores"	Yamil Rezc	Yamil Rezc	1:11
2.	"Maldita primavera" (Remaster 2008)	Paolo Amerigo Cassella; Totò Savio	Yuri	3:51
3.	"Es Mejor Así"	Alejandro Zepeda Cervantes; Giuseppe Dati; Raffaele Riefoli	Christian Castro	3:57
4.	"Mío"	José Ramón Flórez; César Valle	Paulina Rubio	3:40
5.	"Déjenme si estoy llorando"	Nelson Ned	Nelson Ned	3:02
6.	"Tormento"	Mon Laferte	Mon Laferte	4:36
7.	"Noche sensorial"	Andrés David Restrepo Echavarría; Carlos Alejandro Patino Gómez; Esteban Mateus Williamson; Johan Esteban Espinosa Cuervo; Julián Eduardo Bernal Burgos; Nicolás Mateus; Salomón Villada Hoyos	Esteman	3:21
8.	"Tímido"	Luis Carlos Esteban Catalina; Pablo Pinilla Rogado	Flans	3:40
9.	"Esa hembra es mala"	Gloria de los Ángeles Treviño Ruiz; Marcela De La Garza; Baltazar Hinojosa	Gloria Trevi	3:58
10.	"Mira lo que son las cosas"	Amato Angel; Eugenio Julio Cesar	Los Socios del Ritmo	2:53
11.	"Lo Haré Por Ti"	F Estefano Salgado	Paulina Rubio	4:41
12.	"Me conformo"	Augusto Algueró Dasca; Antonio Guijarro Campoy	Alberto Vázquez	3:33
13.	"Mamy Blue" (Instrumental)	Hubert Giraud; Phil Trim	Paul Mauriat	2:49
14.	"Señora"	José Sardaña Garcia; Juan Oliveras Capdevila; Pedro Capdevila	Víctor Yturbe	3:07
15.	"Mi gran noche"	Salvatore Adamo	Raphael	3:06
16.	"Si conmigo tú no estás"	Ricardo Rey; Hector Palacios	Los Ángeles Negros	2:27
17.	"Nieva, Nieva"	C. Valle; Mari Carmen Sánchez	Paulina Rubio	3:32
18.	"Aunque no sea conmigo" (Live)	Santiago Díaz Vera	Pesado feat. Celso Piña	4:00
19.	"Te ví partir"	Pedro Reyna Cisneros	Los Socios del Ritmo	3:09
20.	"Ábranse perras" (Live)	G. Treviño Ruiz; M. De La Garza	Gloria Trevi	4:56
21.	"Lo que te queda"	Yaco Monti	Los Pulpos	3:01
22.	"Yes Sir, I Can Boogie"	Frank Dostal; Rolf Soja	Sophie Ellis-Bextor	3:59
23.	"El Triste"	Roberto Cantoral	Alexa de Landa	5:02

== Analysis ==
Smith notes that beyond merely being an openly transgressive telenovela, the show "boasted a self-conscious and ironic reference" to the tradition it was leaving behind by taking the veteran actress Verónica Castro as its star. However, he does note that the three main areas of novelty within the show's production had already been shown by indie producers Argos in the 1990s, some preceding even the new wave of Mexican cinema; he particularly looks at the show Mirada de mujer, a successful late-90s "avowedly feminist telenovela" that he considers the predecessor of The House of Flowers based on their renovations to the genre and, in content, many similarities. As Smith's Film Quarterly editor on the subject, B. Ruby Rich commented that The House of Flowers owes "a big debt" to Mirada de mujer. Despite such similarities, Smith concedes that "the tone of Netflix's series is much more playful", that it makes use of color where Argos' telenovelas did not, and is less harsh to the bourgeois family at its heart.

Raciel D. Martínez Gómez also notes one similarity that the show bears with traditional telenovelas, being that it uses Mexico City and its elite neighborhoods to express a lightness within the story; Martínez Gómez suggests that of recent popular Mexican output the only work to use the city in a more social-realist way was Alfonso Cuarón's Roma. In terms of color, Grosso Cortes et al. note that the temperature of the series is between neutral and cold (in the 5000K to 7000K range), which they suggest shows a work as being "hostile" (Note: Spanish: "un lugar hostil [...] que proyecte una imagen de una historia cotidiana") but also "everyday", by not being too cold. They also note that, in The House of Flowers, the cold temperature makes the show more colorful, "due to the combination of colors present in the flowers": (Note: Spanish: "debido a la combinación de colores presentes en las flores") the cold tone is "embellished by the different colors of the flowers that appear". (Note: Spanish: "se ve embellecido por los diferentes colores de las flores que aparecen")

Jacqueline Avila looks at the use of music in the show, comparing it to the inherently musical form of telenovelas, saying that it "plays a significant and meaningful role in the developing narratives, highlighting and magnifying elements that reflect both the local and the global and incorporating past practices into a new format for a new generation of audience members who attempt to transcend borders"; she also examines the relationship of Spanish-language broadcasting with the Netflix digital platform, viewing habits, and their influences on the form of the telenovela. Noting that the use of music in streaming series is necessarily different from films and scheduled television because of unpredictable viewing habits, and interacting with Rick Altman's theory of flow, Avila writes that The House of Flowers uses music to underscore the narrative and to help signify aspects of the Mexican telenovela in the show. She gives the example of the diegetic music used during Roberta's funeral in the second episode, as it provides campy elements of telenovelas while reflecting the grief, pain, and character relationships. Despite having connected the show with the telenovela, and noting that the music selection taps into Mexico's popular culture, Avila ultimately concludes that "the strategic use of music [...] provides a more cinematic approach" than "older traditions", saying that this "encourages a more prolonged and attentive listening strategy rather than relying on shorter episodes and pauses for commercials".

Avila discusses other aspects of the show: non-musical sound and the function of the cabaret. She describes the voice-over narration from Roberta as "a ghostly omnipresent voice [that] is strikingly similar to the narrator in Alfonso Cuarón's [...] Y tu mamá también" and believes it fulfills the purpose of Michel Chion's "textual speech" concept. Teresa Piñeiro Otero further discusses this narration. She writes that, along the same lines as Sunset Boulevard and Desperate Housewives, the series employs a posthumous narrator: Roberta. In the midst of Ernesto's birthday party, a female figure is visually highlighted among the crowd, raising the curiosity of the audience by the gaze directed through the camera. With the audience's curiosity sated at the moment of Roberta's suicide, the character then begins narrating, with her voice seeming to be released from the body, presenting characteristics of the "incorporeal voice" (Note: Spanish: "voz incorpórea") proposed by Linda Kreger Silverman. (Note: This article incorporates text by Teresa Piñeiro Otero available under the CC BY 4.0 license. This text was originally in Spanish.) Piñeiro Otero also compares the similar situations initiating both The House of Flowers and Desperate Housewives to reiterate the former's genre as black comedy, writing that while the dead woman of Desperate Housewives was well-respected and an equal member of their rich neighborhood, Roberta is not and often simply called "the hanged lady" (Note: Spanish: "la colgada") by the de la Mora family.

Corresponding with feminist theory, Piñeiro Otero then asserts that with Roberta's voice free of her body, it is free of patriarchal control. Thus, there is a rupture between Roberta as character and Roberta as narrator: the first is subject to her image and constrained by her role of "Other", the second is free to wander and is subversive in front of the patriarchal discourse. By not being contained in any body this voice is empowered and is omniscient, able to provide information that she lacked while living and even about characters she did not know. Having discussed the classical artistic conventions that have created an entrenched association between women and death, Piñeiro Otero expands on her feminist reading of the series, writing that when faced with the silence and stillness of death, which have objectified female beauty, Roberta rebels through the word. Only as a voice, Roberta dares to challenge Virginia de la Mora, the official wife and her former boss. Piñeiro Otero concludes that the voice-over in The House of Flowers reveals the truth, rather than just appearances. In some cases the narrative underlines Roberta's omniscient character and foreshadows much later events as a nod to the most observant audience. In addition to empowering her as a voice, Roberta's actions give her a continuous and destabilizing presence in the story.

Writing on another voice, a section of Avila's article is given to describing the cultural impact of Paulina's diction and comparing it against the similar speech of Cuca, la telefonista in The Disobedient Son. Avila suggests that Paulina has reclaimed the voice from the lazy Cuca character's portrayal to instead give it to Paulina, "a funny woman who is more capable and present". Avila finds that "[Paulina's] voice and delivery [...] creates a fascinating sound synthesis". Avila also writes that the use of the cabaret as a focus in the show provides a history of Mexican popular culture, a space to examine queer narratives, and a symbol for further identity politics that present discourses on politics and economics; she notes that the name 'La Casa de las Flores' when applied to the cabaret is a reference to the Caló terms for gay men (florecita and floripondio).

Near the end of season 1 episode 2, Paulina and Ernesto (foreground) break their 'important' conversation to take notice of the drag performer (center), in a moment critically discussed by multiple scholars.

Referring to a moment later to be noted by Avila, Ernesto Diezmartínez discusses the show as breaking conventions of the telenovela when the drag queen performing as Gloria Trevi at Roberta's funeral is framed between Ernesto and Paulina de la Mora having a conversation. Diezmartínez writes that while the pair are talking in "typical redundant telenovela dialogue" (Note: Spanish: "típico diálogo redundante de telenovela") but are "supposed to be saying something really important, [Paulina] interrupts the dialogue" (Note: Spanish: "se supone que Ernesto y Paulina están diciendo algo realmente importante, ella interrumpe el diálogo") to acknowledge, in a comment directed at Ernesto, how good the performance is; Diezmartínez argues that Caro does this to force the audience to notice the subversive aspect of the show over the expectation. He also looks at the show as an auteur product of Manolo Caro – he compares Paco León's transsexual character to that of Mariana Treviño in Amor de mis amores and the show's soundtrack to those of Amor de mis amores and No sé si cortarme las venas o dejármelas largas, which he also notes are Almodóvar-style – and comments on the writing of the series as compared to classic telenovelas – he says that with a thirteen-episode first season the writers "compress sub-plots that could last weeks in a traditional telenovela to solve them in a couple of episodes", (Note: Spanish: "comprimen subtramas que podrían durar semanas en una telenovela tradicional para resolverlas en un par de episodios") but also that it still sticks closely enough to the telenovela that it "cannot avoid falling into a certain plot overload" (Note: Spanish: "no puede evitar caer en cierta sobrecarga argumental") and suggests that to continue the series for too long would over-extend it in a negative way.

In his article, Adrián Arjona Bueno looks at transgender representation on Netflix. Choosing María José as a subject of analysis, and noting comparisons between this character and the character of the same name(s) in the 1970s Spanish film Change of Sex, Arjona Bueno writes that despite coming from a typically privileged position – María José is ethnically Spanish (and therefore white), and wealthy and educated, which enabled her to access her job as a lawyer, giving a higher social standing – the character has lived within a conservative family that is concerned with appearances, in Mexico, and so presents as "an oppressed identity, withstanding the tensions, pressures and impudence of [this] society". (Note: Spanish: "una identidad oprimida, soportando las tensiones, presiones y descaros de una sociedad") Arjona Bueno's determination on the representation provided by the character is mixed: he writes that, though she has a good job and social position, María José is mistreated by her family (the de la Moras), including being deadnamed at times, and has had surgery to justify her female identity. Also noting that María José is shown to be a good parent and loyal partner, Arjona Bueno concludes that transgender representation is improving to show "less stereotyped [and] more inclusive" characters. Cagri Yalkin names the series as exemplifying the increasing presence of LGBT+ characters, among a selection of shows that she writes are "reflecting both the changes in society and simultaneously acting as change forerunners".

Ortiz González, in his thesis, also looks at transgender representation; discussing the casting of a cisgender male actor, he notes that while other series sometimes show the character transitioning, María José in The House of Flowers is long since past this, with the coming out flashback scene "lasting only seconds". (Note: Spanish: "dura apenas unos segundos") He also examines moments of misgendering in the series through the gendered language of Spanish, particularly the use of the generic "los" ("the", plural, neuter or masculine) when referring to Paulina and María José together, when "las" would be more appropriate. In a similar moment mentioned, María José cannot settle on a name to give to people looking for Bruno and reverts to just saying that she is his father, which Ortiz González says is "a thing that, however much she is a woman, does not cease to be true". (Note: Spanish: "cosa que, por mucho que sea mujer, no deja de ser") In another instance, Bruno uses the masculine form of a curse word when insulting her. Ortiz González also mentions how María José is occasionally deadnamed, but writes that this is usually immediately corrected (particularly by Paulina and Virginia) and seems accidental out of habit.

On the more technical front, Claudia Benassini Félix has analyzed the success of the series in line with Netflix's machine learning and user recommendation algorithms, and the company's use of these to develop more profitable original series. From literature reviews, Benassini Félix determined that the past success of Spanish-language Netflix originals was a primary reason for the popularity of the show, based on Netflix's production plans, its targeted recommendations and suggested percentage of enjoyment, and the ability of users to create a 'watchlist'.

== Status as a telenovela ==
Suárez, Derbez, and Castro as their The House of Flowers characters in a video parodying telenovelas; the coloring, mise-en-scène and acting are styled like a traditional telenovela, serving as a comparative.

The show has been described as a telenovela, a typical Mexican genre characterized by melodrama and exaggerated plot twists, though the Ibero-American Observatory of Television Fiction considers it a series, rather than a telenovela. In 2018, Caro said that people had been worried about using the term 'telenovela', because "they thought it would make [him] angry"; (Note: Spanish: "pensaban que yo me enojaría") he says that labeling the show as melodramatic is quite accurate, and it did not bother him. Also in 2018, Netflix created a campaign called 'No es una telenovela' in response to various popular comments about the streaming service becoming like the network Televisa, known in Mexico for its telenovelas. For the campaign, a parody video called La Rosa de la Virgin was shared on social media; in it, characters from The House of Flowers played by Suárez, Derbez, and Castro appear in a scene in the style of a traditional telenovela, highlighting the differences – it specifically compares the series with the style of Mexican telenovela La Rosa de Guadalupe. At one point, Verónica Castro as Virginia says "esto no es una telenovela" ("this is not a telenovela"), but then closes the video with a suggestive wink to the camera.

Netflix had previously created a telenovela-esque spoof of Orange Is the New Black, during a time when it had a deal with Televisa in 2016, borrowing the character Soraya Montenegro, who had become an Internet meme representing the excesses of melodrama. Scholar Elia Cornelio-Marí suggests that the two contrasting parodies show "the love-hate relationship that Netflix has with melodrama, making fun of the genre but promoting it at the same time".

The series has also been called a "millennial telenovela". The term has been discussed in relation to several series that have kept elements of the telenovela but have been targeted towards the millennial market in style, tone, and content. Caro and Suárez have said they are proud for The House of Flowers to be called a millennial telenovela. Caro has also been described as the re-inventor of the telenovela. He has referred to the traditional mode as "obsolete", (Note: Spanish: "obsoleta") criticizing other creators for "not knowing how to evolve"; (Note: Spanish: "no saber haber evolucionado") Suárez has added that a key to the show is still to connect with the "sentimental" response that Mexicans have to a telenovela, part of their culture from childhood. Arturo Aguilar and Primitivo Olvera for W Radio México agree, saying that it borrows a lot from the telenovela and is "enormously built out of nostalgia". (Note: Spanish: "está enormemente construido de la nostalgia".)

Cornelio-Marí writes extensively on the telenovela and melodramatic elements of The House of Flowers, saying that it "is catalogued as a comedy, but in fact is a self-conscious melodrama with an ironic twist", noting several elements that contribute to this. She explores the same 'nostalgic' references that Suárez, Aguilar and Olvera noted, writing that the series "is using melodrama as a repository of shared references that create emotional attachment in Mexican audiences, exploiting nostalgia for the media culture of past decades"; she additionally suggests that this nostalgia is the reason for the inclusion of the drag queens as famous pop divas. Other ways in which Cornelio-Marí suggests the show is reflective of the telenovela are the inclusion of Verónica Castro as "a seemingly traditional housewife"; the series' focus on family, characters, and plot twists that are distinctly melodramatic, particularly having a paternity dilemma as a main plot point; a focus on morals and gender roles; and "its exaggerated mise-en-scène", said to be reflective of melodramatic tradition.

Referring to its genre designation as a black comedy, Cornelio-Marí writes that "melodrama is pervasive in Netflix's Mexican productions, although not recognized openly". She suggests a reason for the obscurity, separating melodrama from the telenovela and saying that "melodrama is still strongly connected to telenovelas and they still carry the connotation of low culture": Cornelio-Marí argues that the melodrama is "cleverly disguised" so as to attract viewers fond of that culture while not discouraging viewers who would not want to watch something described as a telenovela. She describes the Rosa de la Virgen video as Netflix "[going] to great lengths to publicly deny that La Casa de las Flores is a telenovela".

Susana Guerrero, in discussion with Ramon Lobato, suggested that the traditional telenovela has fallen out of mainstream popularity; she wrote that though the telenovela has been seen as an important genre around the world for a long time, networks have had to make them more marketable. Guerrero said "the modern take on telenovelas is anything but the version of its former self, and that has been key in securing the genre's longevity [because] the genre has lost viewers on traditional television over time", with television broadcasters Telemundo and Univision making more narco-themed telenovelas to recapture the market while Netflix opted instead for "a more contemporary feel", according to Lobato. In the nine months to February 2020, views of The House of Flowers grew overall by 5%, spiking after the season 2 release at 15% growth, a similar trend to the series Jane the Virgin, a telenovela parody.

While Cornelio-Marí concludes that Netflix has used algorithms to "decode the formula for cultural proximity" in order to create the most internationally marketable telenovela-adjacent television shows and "influence the evolution of melodrama in the years to come", she also includes that there is a "need to conduct deeper textual analysis of titles like La Casa de las Flores and its paratexts as transmedia expansions (e.g., memes, advertising, viewers' comments, etc.), in order to arrive to more grounded conclusions about the ways in which melodrama is becoming part of Netflix's productions".

== Reception ==
=== Critical reception ===
The story of the De la Mora family bids farewell with a third season in which it returns to its initial freshness and drops the self-conscious veil of its failed second season. In 2018, Manolo Caro achieved what seemed to be a chimaera. With a handful of episodes he renovated the telenovela, bringing it closer to a new audience "with characters and themes that concern us", according to the Mexican. The genre of this "millennial telenovela" had brought a perversion of the tropes of the most Latin American of genres, but without cynicism. Impossible romances, humor, visual mannerism, musicality, irreverence, thematic diversity, and melodrama. (Note: Spanish: La historia sobre la familia De la Mora se despide con una tercera temporada en la que vuelve a sentirse la frescura inicial y se quita el velo autoconsciente de su fallido segundo arco. Hacia 2018 Manolo Caro logró lo que parecía una quimera. Con un puñado de episodios renovó el culebrón acercándolo a un nuevo público "con personajes y temas que nos atañen", dijo el mexicano. El gen de esta "telenovela millenial" se hallaba en una perversión de los códigos pero sin cinismo del más latinoamericano de los géneros. Amores imposibles, humor, manierismo visual, musicalidad, desfachatez, diversidad temática y melodrama.)

— Federico Lisica, Página/12

Reviews of the show were generally positive, and Cecilia Suárez has been repeatedly singled out and praised for her performance as Paulina; (Note: From multiple international sources, including: Into, Instinct, Vice, Decider, PopSugar, and India Today.) her role on the show was reverently described by Javier Zurro as: "And here she entered, Cecilia Suárez, a whirlwind discovered in La casa de las flores who took everything. She was the star. Her Paulina de la Mora is a revelation, a poster girl buried to the eyebrows in meds who, however, was the most modern and determined character in the story." (Note: Spanish: "Y aquí entraba ella, Cecilia Suárez, torbellino descubierto en La casa de las flores y que se apropió de todo. Ella era la estrella. Su Paulina de la Mora es un hallazgo, una pija puesta de orfidal hasta las cejas que, sin embargo, era el personaje más moderno y decidido de la historia.")

Kayla Cobb of Decider called The House of Flowers "the Mexican Desperate Housewives", and praised "its willingness to be seedy." Cobb's review looks positively on the melodrama and the characterizations of Paulina and Virginia, but concedes that while exciting and fun to watch, it is "not great television". Brenden Gallagher of The Daily Dot similarly called the series light-hearted and adventurous, but he noted that character development was lacking and that the show could have gone further to challenge the usual parameters of the telenovela genre; Greg Wheeler of The Review Geek agrees that it does not do much different from other shows, but conversely thinks that it has "a good amount of character development". In terms of pushing generic conventions, David Lopez of Instinct wrote that the show, especially considering season 2, marked a turning point in Mexican television and its approach to modernity, keeping the telenovela classics but embracing more open topics both intelligently and humorously. Guillermo Espinosa of Mujer Hoy said that the show "has shaken the foundations of the telenovela genre". (Note: Spanish: "ha sacudido los cimientos del género de la telenovela")

José Antonio Martínez of Juego de series celebrates that the show gives "a very different image of Mexico to that offered by U.S. cinema", (Note: Spanish: "una imagen muy diferente de México al que ofrece por ejemplo el cine de Estados Unidos") and noted in particular that Elena's story in the second season is similar to one from the British comedy Fleabag. Writing about the series in 2020, Variety's John Hopewell said that it confirms Caro's ability "to transfer his auteurist personality from big to small screen", with the series being "one of the first premium series from Mexico to break out internationally". Hopewell writes that the series has become a cult hit in Spain. Going the other way, María Alba said that the show has made Paco and María León household names in Mexico.

Several reviews also comment on the show's Spanish-language nature, suggesting that rather than watch the available dubbed version, which has been described as "truly horrendous", the show is better in Spanish anyway, with subtitles if necessary. Suárez, Yazbek Bernal, and Medina all dub their own characters into English for the show, with Medina also providing other voices. Jonathon Wilson of Ready Steady Cut argued that the show's dub was at least better than that of Welcome to the Family, a similar Catalan-language show picked up by Netflix.

In November 2018, ABC wrote that the series (season 1) was the latest of Netflix's worldwide successes, and that it was then one of the most-watched current series around the world, marking it as part of the Mexican boom of new media. Diego Da Costa for Cinemagavia wrote that the "sparkle, mamarrachería" ("craziness") and "visual histrionics" were missing in season 2. (Note: Spanish: "se ha perdido el brillo, la mamarrachería", "se echa en falta mayor histrionsimo [sic] visual") Perú.21's Esther Vargas said that the third season is "a manifesto of love and a cry against homophobia and transphobia", (Note: Spanish: "un manifiesto al amor y un grito contra la homofobia, y la transfobia") and at the end of April 2020, Film Daily reported on the show as one of their 'our obsessions' features, calling it "one of, if not the most underrated Netflix original comedy".

=== Popular response ===
The show has been popular internationally, including in non-Spanish-speaking countries, and is said to be most watched by millennials. British daily newspaper Manchester Evening News singled it out above all other Netflix shows as a valuable language-learning tool because of how it "switches between English and Spanish and [is] not too fast paced". Balán's season 2 review said that some viewers saw this season as more boring and forced than the first. Regarding the show in general, Pere Solà Gimferrer for La Vanguardia wrote that it "works because it's like a meme on legs", (Note: Spanish: "funciona porque es una especie de meme con patas") saying that, likely by design, Caro has made each scene feature something that people immediately want to start talking about on social media. Solà says that it is either a good black comedy, or a "Sharknado telenovela" spoof. In early 2020, the de la Moras were described as "one of the most recognized families in Mexico". (Note: Spanish: "una de las familias más reconocidas en México") During the 2020 COVID-19 pandemic, Falls suggested people could watch the series if they were "not getting enough family drama in quarantine".

Paulina de la Mora speaking
A recording of Paulina saying "Pero estoy enganchadísima con el Tafil, oye" in her distinctive style. After spawning Internet memes, Paulina's voice was at the center of marketing material for the show's second season.

The unusual speech pattern of Paulina became popular, spawning the '#PaulinaDeLaMoraChallenge' on social media, where fans imitate the slow, enunciated, way of speaking, often with some of the character's lines. The challenge was started by Mexican actor Roberto Carlo, with the stars of Cable Girls taking it up. When Netflix and Suárez responded with their own version of the challenge on Twitter, it became a trending event on the website, based on popularity and coverage; until March 2020, this was the only time that Suárez had spoken in Paulina's voice outside of the show, which she says is due to Netflix restrictions. She has clarified this as being "a suggestion" that she follows to not break the magic of the fiction. By the time Suárez responded, over 69,000 fan videos had been shared; only a few days after the first season was released, a petition had been started to include Paulina's voice as an option on the GPS navigation app Waze. Suárez posted another social media video in character during the COVID-19 pandemic from quarantine in Madrid, telling everyone in Mexico to stay at home and reminding them that male relatives can also look after elderly family members (comparing this to Julián and their grandmother on the show) – she followed the post with one of her own, where she reiterated the request and said that the situation in Madrid was "really scary". (Note: Spanish: "realmente alarmantes")

In response to Paulina saying in one episode that she is "addicted to Tafil", (Note: This was dubbed into American English as Xanax, and subtitled as Tafil; both are brand names.) (Note: Spanish: "Es-toy en-gan-cha-dí-si-ma con el Ta-fil, oye") the BBC ran an article explaining what Tafil is, also suggesting that the anti-anxiety medication is the cause of Paulina's slow speech as this is one of the more severe side effects of overuse of the drug. It noted, however, that the character's voice and Tafil use are creatively coincidental as they were conceived of separately during the show's development: Suárez said that the voice came through a process of improvisation during filming, with Caro liking it and having her re-record some of the early scenes to match. Verónica Calderón of Vogue also notes that Paulina's voice is demarcating of the fresa stereotype ("yuppie") that her character plays with, and is not unusual in upper-class neighborhoods like Las Lomas, suggesting that it could be used as part of the show's socio-economic commentary. Clarín's Pablo Raimondi said that the style of diction establishes her as a "daddy's girl" (Note: Spanish: "nena de papá") and a character who can know everyone's secrets.

Scholar Smith explained that clips of Paulina's memorable lines uploaded to the Internet by fans have received hundreds of thousands of views, and that t-shirts featuring the quotes were shortly after being sold on Amazon. Suárez has also suggested that Paulina became popular because she "does not discriminate" (Note: Spanish: "no discrimina") by race, class, or sexual identity. Despite gaining a following, Suárez has refuted the idea that Paulina may have a spin-off, assuring that she does not believe Caro would choose to do that because the character belongs in the show's story.

In opposition to Suárez's popularity, Martínez has said that some fans of Verónica Castro did not like when Castro left the show and were not happy with Suárez becoming the leading actor, because of her differing views on traditional telenovelas, like those which Castro starred in, and similar refusal to portray typical Mexican stereotypes. The Hollywood Reporter also noted that Castro's return to acting was a key contributor to the show's initial popularity in Mexico in 2018. Taibo reported that fans "haven't liked it very much" (Note: Spanish: "no les ha gustado mucho") but that Caro had made her absence "as painless as possible". (Note: Spanish: "lo menos dolorosa posible")

Espinosa also suggested that the show has had a positive social effect on families in Mexico; León affirmed that he had been told stories of parents in Guadalajara who now "no longer fear that their son is gay", (Note: Spanish: "ya no temen que su hijo sea gay") adding with laughter that "what makes them panic is that they might be trans", (Note: Spanish: "lo que ahora les da verdadero pánico es que sea trans") but confirming that the show has at least brought the topic of transsexuality to discussion in more conservative Mexican families. Suárez believes that these aspects have been more easily accepted because of the familiar genre of telenovela that all Mexicans relate to, and because of Caro's intelligent writing around taboo subjects that allows audiences to be entertained by them as an opening to discussion.

The drag queens from the show also gained popularity, and in 2019 began touring in character with a drag show called 'Las Reinas del Cabaret'. The drag queens performed live during the show and impersonated other artists beyond their characters, as well. Preceding the tour was the promotional opening of a The House of Flowers-themed cabaret, running from October 16 to October 18, which included more immersive features for fans of the show, like a 'prison meeting' area to speak to El Cacas and a 'Drag Lounge' makeover space with the performers from the show. Tickets were available through promotions on social media. Parts of this show were broadcast live on the series' Facebook page. An unconnected gay club in Monterrey, which was open between October 2018 and October 2019, was called 'La Casa de Pau li na' after the show.

In November 2019, Netflix launched a line of book companions to some of its series. From a deal made with Grupo Planeta in July 2019 to produce Spanish-language books for Spain and Latin America, the first four launched on November 26 across the Spanish speaking world. One of these is the official fanbook of The House of Flowers, published by the imprint Libros Cúpula and said to compile all the behind-the-scenes secrets of the show with a tone that reflects the show's style.

=== Comparisons to Almodóvar ===
When you watch the credits after an episode of La Casa de las Flores, you expect to see the legendary Spanish director's name at the end. With a show focused on family and identity, offering melodrama, complex narratives, and plenty of pop culture trends and top hits, it's hard not to feel that Almodóvar touched this project.

— Bethany Wade, Film Daily

The style of the show has been widely compared to that of Spanish filmmaker Pedro Almodóvar; creator Manolo Caro is said to be a "shameless admirer" (Note: Portuguese: "descaradamente um admirador") of him, and has taken influence from him in his own works. Espinosa refers to Caro as a "young Mexican Almodóvar". (Note: Spanish: "joven Almodóvar mexicano")

When asked why he thinks the show is successful, actor Paco León said that the characters and style drove it, and "it's like, all of a sudden Almodóvar had made a television series in the eighties", (Note: Spanish: "es como si de repente Almodóvar hubiese hecho una teleserie en los ochenta") while Manuel Betancourt, in a write-up before the show premiered, described it as "what would happen if Almodóvar finally caved and wrote a TV show, sprinkled some of Las Aparicio family melodrama in, and decided that it needed some of the queer vibe that Paco León's own films have been mining".

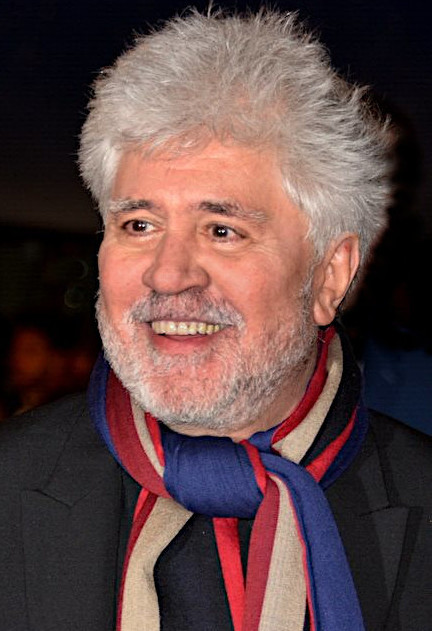
Acclaimed Spanish filmmaker Pedro Almodóvar is seen as a large influence on the series

Critic Nader notes that these Almodóvar "aesthetics" (Note: Portuguese: "estética") may annoy some viewers, but that he enjoyed "[t]he colors, the faces and mouths, the absurd situations, the masculine nudes, the obviously tacky costumes and scenery" (Note: Portuguese: "as cores, as caras e bocas, as situações absurdas, os nus masculinos, os figurinos e cenários assumidamente cafonas") that make it this style. Mariana Motta said that the satirical takes on telenovela tropes allowed comparison to Almodóvar, herself comparing the show's handling of topics that traditional society sees as perversion to The Skin I Live In and saying that "the use of angles and colors that express more than dialogue can, and the use of music and intertextuality, translate for the Mexican experience what the acclaimed director does with Spanish society". (Note: Portuguese: "o uso de ângulos e cores que expressam mais do que diálogos, e o uso da música e da intertextualidade traduzem para a vivência mexicana aquilo que o aclamado diretor faz com a sociedade espanhola") Writing for Fuera de series, Marina Such said that the darkly comedic melodrama and the contrasting settings of the two House of Flowers establishments give the show its Almodóvar feel from the outset, noting that the character María José could be from Todo sobre mi madre (All About My Mother); Carlos Aguilar suggested that the "Almodóvar-esque drama" may be an aspect that endears the show to English speakers, while Andrew Pulver of The Guardian compared the aesthetics, writing that since the show is "heavily influenced by Pedro Almodóvar, it's a visual treat".

In his scathing review, Pavel Gaona negatively compared the two, saying that "there is a huge difference between taking something [Almodóvar] as a reference and another in practically making a carbon copy and doing it wrong", (Note: Spanish: "hay una enorme diferencia entre tomar algo como referencia y otra en prácticamente copiarlo al carbón y encima hacerlo mal") and that Manolo Caro should "seek his own voice and aesthetics" (Note: Spanish: "buscar una voz y una estética propias") rather than emulate Almodóvar's techniques without the same naturalness. Smith refers to the series as showcasing an innovation in aesthetics through "the appeal to a lush 'Almodóvarian' style". However, he writes that "the series' tone comes too close to early Almodóvar for comfort" with the inclusion of a drag bar, particularly one featuring campy eighties Spanish pop.

=== Accolades ===
==== Awards and nominations ====
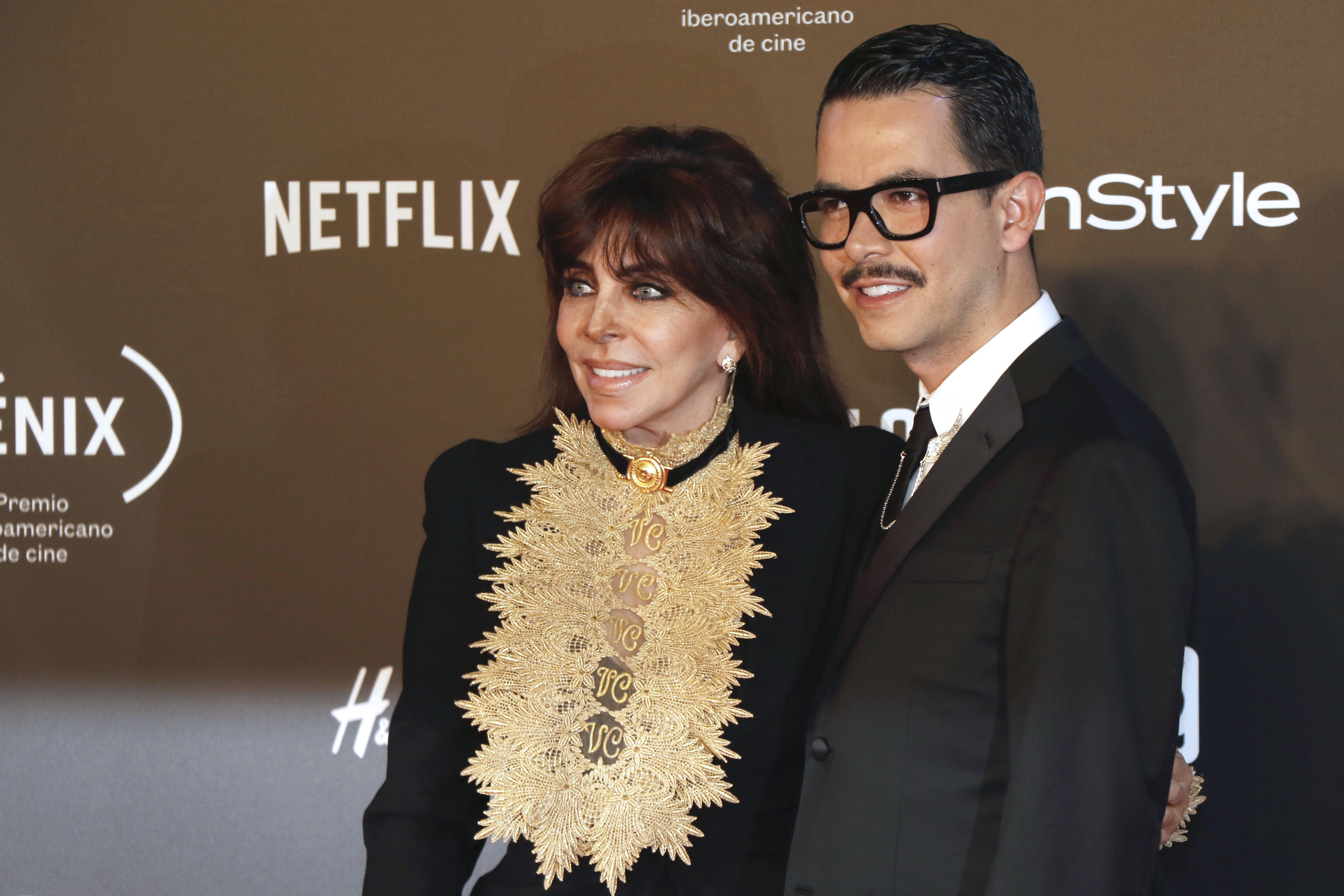
Manolo Caro and Verónica Castro (pictured in 2017) have both won awards for the show

At the 2019 Platino Awards, the main international film and television awards for Ibero-American media, the show was nominated in two categories. Also co-hosting the ceremony, Cecilia Suárez was nominated as Best Actress in the television category, which she won. In the Best Miniseries or Television Series category, The House of Flowers was nominated but lost to the Paco León-created Arde Madrid. At the 2019 (XXVIII) Spanish Actors Union Awards, Paco León was nominated in the Best Actor in an International Production category for The House of Flowers, though he did not win; he was notably not nominated for his role as Manolo in his own show, Arde Madrid, which won in each category it was nominated.

For the 2018/19 PRODU Awards, the show was nominated in five categories, with three nominations for Manolo Caro, and won in two. Verónica Castro won as Best Actress and Caro as Best Director.

In 2020, the show received nominations for the XXIX Spanish Actors Union Awards for both León siblings; Caro was also nominated in these awards, but for acting in Brigada Costa del Sol. For the 2020 Platino Awards, the show received the third-most television acting nominations (three), including two for Mariana Treviño and Juan Pablo Medina in the new Supporting categories; only Suárez won, repeating her Best Actress win from 2019. At the 2021 Platino Awards, Suárez was the show's only nominee, in the same category, with Caro's second Netflix show also being in contention. Suárez won the IB Public Choice award for TV actress but not the main award.

Year	Award	Category	Nominee(s)	Result	Ref.
2019	Spanish Actors Union Awards	Best Actor in an International Production	Paco León	Nominated	
2019	Platino Awards	Best Miniseries or TV series	The House of Flowers	Nominated	
2019	Platino Awards	Best Actress in a Miniseries or TV series	Cecilia Suárez	Won	
2019	South by Southwest	Excellence in Title Design	Maribel Martinez Galindo	Nominated	
2019	PRODU Awards	Best Actress in a Series, Long Series, or Telenovela	Verónica Castro	Won	
2019	PRODU Awards	Best Director of a Series, Long Series, or Telenovela	Manolo Caro	Won	
2019	PRODU Awards	Best Showrunner of a Series, Long Series, or Telenovela	Manolo Caro	Nominated	
2019	PRODU Awards	Best Writing for a Series, Long Series, or Telenovela	Monika Revilla, Mara Vargas, Gabriel Nuncio and Manolo Caro	Nominated	
2019	PRODU Awards	Best Cinematography in a Series, Long Series, or Telenovela	Pedro Gómez Millán	Nominated	
2020	Spanish Actors Union Awards	Best Actress in an International Production	María León	Nominated	
2020	Spanish Actors Union Awards	Best Actor in an International Production	Paco León	Nominated	
2020	Platino Awards	Best Actress in a Miniseries or TV series	Cecilia Suárez	Won	
2020	Platino Awards	Best Supporting Actress in a Miniseries or TV series	Mariana Treviño	Nominated	
2020	Platino Awards	Best Supporting Actor in a Miniseries or TV series	Juan Pablo Medina	Nominated	
2021	Platino Awards	IB Public Choice Best TV Actress	Cecilia Suárez	Won	
2021	Platino Awards	Best Actress in a Miniseries or TV series	Cecilia Suárez	Nominated	

==== Best-of lists ====
The show has made two 'best-of' lists created by The Hollywood Reporter. In 2018, it was listed in its own entry (separate to the entry for Spanish-language Netflix originals in general) on the list of the top 10 international television moments of the year, being celebrated for "[putting] a racy and decidedly more contemporary spin on the telenovela genre" to save it from "losing viewers to melodramatic, action-packed narco series". In 2019, Caro was included on their list of the best showrunners for creating, writing, and directing it, with Scott Roxborough saying that he "has a knack for [mixing] telenovela plots with a sharp ear for dialogue and a stand-up's sense of timing".

Suárez and her role as Paulina in The House of Flowers were included in an Entertainment Tonight list in December 2018 as the only Spanish-language star and show of the thirteen shows said to have contributed to the "rise of the Latinx TV Star" in the US that year. In February 2019, Screen Rant listed it as the eighth best Spanish-language show available on Netflix in its top 10, saying "there is absolutely no going wrong with [it]".

The series was listed as the sixth best foreign-language TV show on Netflix in The Daily Dot's top 15, which said that "there's a winking comedic playfulness throughout the show, which offers good old-fashioned soapy gloss with some modern renovations". Media reviewers for La Tercera placed the series as number 70 of its '70 best series of all time that you can watch on Netflix' list, saying that it is "certainly going to be a classic". (Note: Spanish: "que de seguro será un clásico") On April 17, 2020, the show, about to release its final season, was included on The Guardian's 'Best home entertainment' list.

== See also ==
- Cecilia Suárez filmography and awards

== Notes ==
=== Translated quotations ===
Some quotations in this article were originally in languages other than English, and have been user-translated.
