= Darío Yazbek Bernal =

Mexican actor (born 1990)

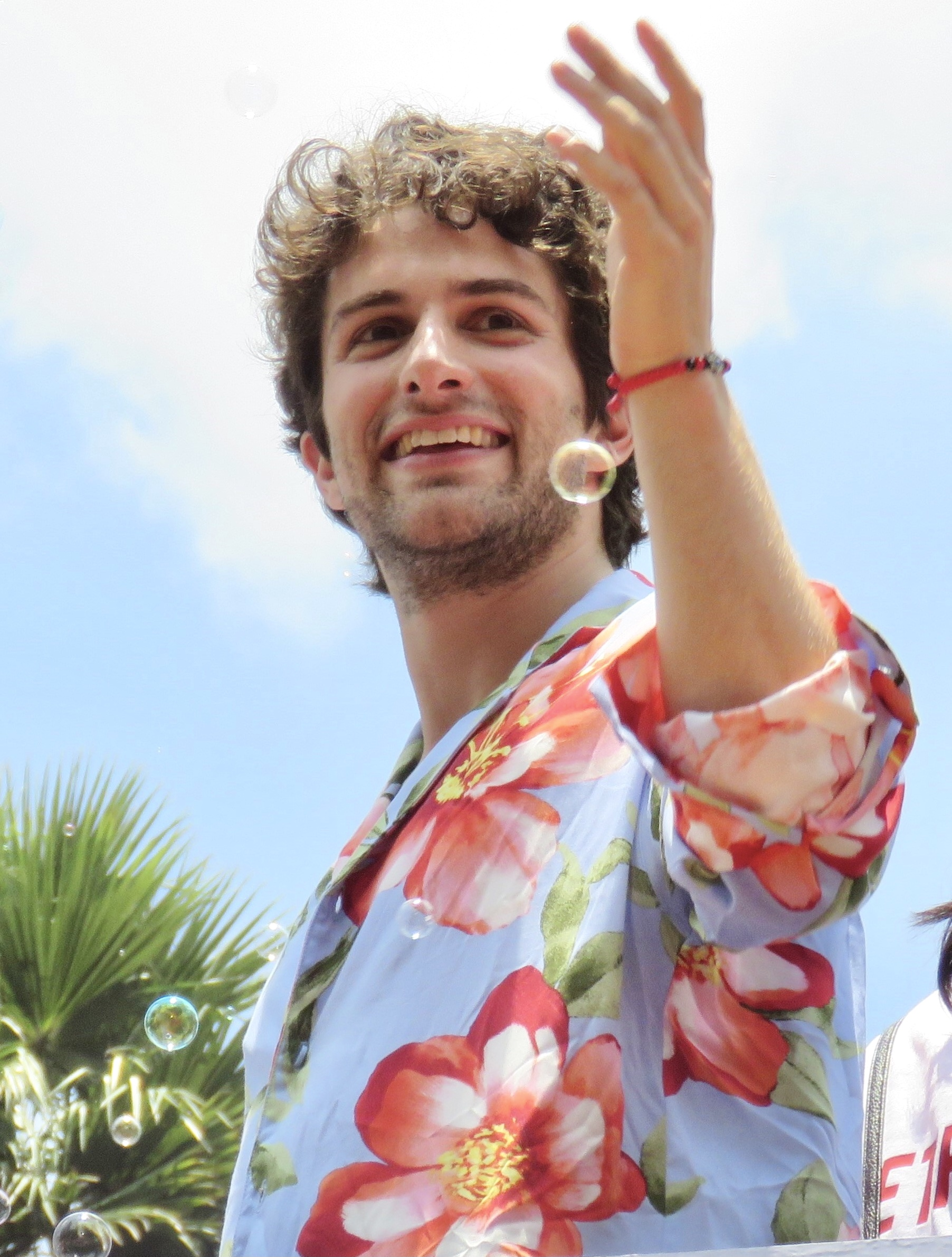
- Born: 30 November 1990 (age 35); Mexico City, Mexico
- Occupation: Actor
- Years active: 2009–present
- Mother: Patricia Bernal
- Relatives: Gael García Bernal (half-brother)

Darío Yazbek Bernal (born 30 November 1990) is a Mexican actor, known for playing Julián in The House of Flowers on Netflix.

== Early life ==
Yazbek is the son of Sergio Yazbek and Patricia Bernal; his siblings are the actors Tamara Yazbek Bernal (sister) and Gael García Bernal (half-brother). Surrounded by film from a young age, he went straight into acting. He is of Mexican and Lebanese descent.

== Filmography ==
Year	Work	Role	Notes
2009	Daniel & Ana	Daniel Torres	
2010	Dead Happy	The Boy	short
2014	Todo se puede (Everything is Possible)	Dario	short
2016	Sangre Alba		short
2017	Los Paisajes	Pablo	also associate producer
2017	April's Daughter	-	assistant director
2018	El candidato Rayo (The Lightning Candidate)	Carlos Márquez	TV
2018	The Morphable Man	Adio	short
2018	MexcamGirlz	Pablito	TV
2018–2020	The House of Flowers	Julián de la Mora	TV
2019	Unas Ruinas	Daniel	short
2020	Crime Diaries: The Search	Alberto Bazbaz	Netflix
2020	New Order	Alan	Film
2021	The House of Flowers: The Movie	Julián de la Mora	Film
2023	Good Savage	Don Chelo	Film
2023	I Don't Expect Anyone to Believe Me	Juan Pablo	Film
2023	Pet Shop Days	Alejandro	Film
2024	A History of Love and War	Teo	Film
2024	Ramón and Ramón	-	Film
2025	Magellan	Duarte Barbosa	Film
