= The House of Flowers: The Movie =

- Film poster
- Spanish: La casa de las flores: la película
- Directed by: Manolo Caro
- Written by: Gabriel Nuncio; Manolo Caro
- Produced by: Rafa Ley; María José Córdova; Manolo Caro
- Starring: Cecilia Suárez; Aislinn Derbez; Darío Yazbek
- Production company: Noc Noc Cinema
- Distributed by: Netflix
- Release date: June 23, 2021
- Running time: 87 minutes
- Country: Mexico

The House of Flowers: The Movie (Spanish: La Casa de las Flores: la película) is a 2021 Mexican comedy-drama film directed by Manolo Caro. The film was announced in April 2021 and is a sequel of the series of the same name. The film premiered on Netflix on June 23, 2021.

== Synopsis ==
Florist Delia, a confidant of the de la Mora family, requests from her deathbed that Paulina de la Mora find evidence in the old family home in order to have proof against Agustín Corcuera for the murder of Paulina's father, Pato. The de la Mora siblings and associates are reunited to try and retrieve it, but have to devise a plan when the new occupant won't entertain them. In a concurrent storyline set in 1987, Paulina's mother, Virginia, and her friends gather the evidence and hide it.

== Cast ==
Sources:

- Cecilia Suárez as Paulina de la Mora Aguirre
- Darío Yazbek as Julián de la Mora Aguirre
- Aislinn Derbez as Elena de la Mora Aguirre
- Juan Pablo Medina as Diego Olvera
- Angélica María
- Norma Angélica as Delia
- Tessa Ía
- Andrea Chaparro
- Luis de la Rosa as Bruno Riquelme de la Mora
- David Ostrosky as Dr. Salomón Cohen
- Paco León as María José Riquelme
- José Márquez
- Mariana Santos
- Ismael Rodríguez
- Katia Balmori
- Paco Rueda as Agustín "El Chiquis" Corcuera Jr.
- Isabel Burr as Virginia Aguirre
- Tiago Correa as Ernesto de la Mora
- Javier Jattin as Salomón Cohen (1980)
- Ximena Sariñana as Carmela "Carmelita" Villalobos
- Emilio Cuaik as Agustín "Asustin" Corcuera

== Production ==
The film, serving as a spin-off to Mexican breakout series The House of Flowers, was announced on April 23, 2021, by creators Netflix on the Mexican leg of their production slate road trip. Variety suggested that the movie's announcement was an appeasement to the fans of the original series, as there had been disappointment that it only ran for three seasons.
