= Isabel Burr =

Mexican actress

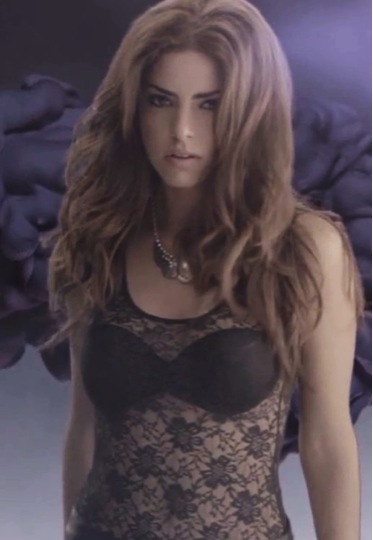
- Burr in 2013
- Born: September 7, 1988 (age 37); Mexico City, Mexico
- Occupation: Actress
- Years active: 2010–present
- Partner: Solkin Ruz

Isabel Burr (born 7 September 1988), is a Mexican actress. She is known for her main role as Adela Huerta in the MTV series Niñas mal, and as Yury Carranza in the Televisa telenovela Si nos dejan.

== Filmography ==
=== Film ===
Year	Title	Role	Notes
2015	A la mala	Dani	Debut film
2016	El lamento	Camila	
2021	The House of Flowers: The Movie	Virginia de la Mora Aguirre (Younger Version)	
2023	Welcome al Norte	Caro	

=== Television ===
Year	Title	Role	Notes
2010–2013	Niñas mal	Adela Huerta	Main role
2011	Kdabra	Lisboa	10 episodes
2012	El Talismán	Fabiola Negrete	Recurring role
2014	Amor sin reserva	Claudia	Recurring role
2015	Señora Acero	Begoña Juárez	Recurring role; 66 episodes (season 2)
2015–2016	Yo quisiera	Claudia	Recurring role; 48 episodes
2016	Dios Inc.	Areta Pereyra	Main role; 11 episodes
2016	Hasta que te conocí	Verónica Castro	Episode: "El Divo"
2016–2017	Perseguidos	Camila Solís	Recurring role; 29 episodes
2017–2018	La hija pródiga	Alicia / Camila	Main role; 66 episodes
2018	Luis Miguel: The Series	Adela Noriega	Episode: "Todo el amor del mundo"
2019-2020	Médicos	Cinthia Guerrero	
2020	The House of Flowers	Virginia de la Mora Aguirre (Younger Version)	
2021	Si nos dejan	Yuri Carranza	
2023	El colapso	Isabel	Episode: "El avión"
