= Pet Shop Days =

- U.S. theatrical release poster
- Directed by: Olmo Schnabel
- Written by: Jack Irv; Olmo Schnabel; Galen Core
- Produced by: Francesco Melzi d'Eril; Gabriele Moratti; Olmo Schnabel; Galen Core; Marie Savare de Laitre; Alex Coco
- Starring: Darío Yazbek Bernal; Jack Irv; Willem Dafoe; Peter Sarsgaard
- Production companies: MeMo Films; Storyteller Productions; TWIN
- Distributed by: Utopia
- Release dates: September 3, 2023 (Venice); March 15, 2025 (United States)
- Running time: 100 minutes
- Country: United Kingdom
- Language: English

Pet Shop Days (formerly titled Pet Shop Boys) is a 2023 British crime thriller film directed by Olmo Schnabel, written by Jack Irv, Schnabel, and Galen Core, and starring Darío Yazbek Bernal, Irv, Willem Dafoe, and Peter Sarsgaard. It premiered at the 80th Venice International Film Festival on September 3, 2023. Utopia released the film in the United States on March 15, 2025.

== Plot ==
After fleeing his well-to-do family in Mexico, Alejandro arrives in New York and meets a young man named Jack, eventually seducing him and drawing him into his criminal life.

== Cast ==
- Darío Yazbek Bernal as Alejandro
- Jack Irv as Jack
- Tal Chatterjee as Sammie
- Willem Dafoe as Francis
- Peter Sarsgaard as Phil
- Grace Brennan as Lucy
- Emmanuelle Seigner as Diana
- Peter Greene as Dealer
- Jordi Mollà as Castro
- Louis Cancelmi as Walker
- Camille Rowe as Andy
- Maribel Verdú as Karla
- Angela Sarafyan as Jenna
- Gerry Bednob as Chandra

== Reception ==
The film has a 29% rating on Rotten Tomatoes based on fourteen reviews.
