= List of The House of Flowers episodes =

The House of Flowers is a Mexican television show created by Manolo Caro for Netflix, which also broadcasts it. It premiered simultaneously worldwide on the streaming service on August 10, 2018, with the final season being released on April 23, 2020.

== Series overview ==
Series overview
| Season | Episodes | Originally released |
|---|---|---|
| 1 | 13 | August 10, 2018 |
| 2 | 9 | October 18, 2019 |
| Special | | November 1, 2019 |
| 3 | 11 | April 23, 2020 |

== Episodes ==
=== Season 1 (2018) ===
| No. overall | No. in season | Title | Directed by | Written by | Original release date |
|---|---|---|---|---|---|
| 1 | 1 | "NARCISSUS (symb. lies)" | Manolo Caro | Manolo Caro | August 10, 2018 |
| 2 | 2 | "CHRYSANTHEMUM (symb. pain)" | Manolo Caro | Gabriel Nuncio | August 10, 2018 |
| 3 | 3 | "LILY (symb. freedom)" | Manolo Caro | Monika Revilla | August 10, 2018 |
| 4 | 4 | "PETUNIA (symb. resentment)" | Manolo Caro | Mara Vargas | August 10, 2018 |
| 5 | 5 | "DAHLIA (symb. gratitude)" | Manolo Caro | Gabriel Nuncio | August 10, 2018 |
| 6 | 6 | "MAGNOLIA (symb. dignity)" | Manolo Caro | Monika Revilla | August 10, 2018 |
| 7 | 7 | "PEONY (symb. shame)" | Manolo Caro | Manolo Caro | August 10, 2018 |
| 8 | 8 | "BROMELIA (symb. resilience)" | Manolo Caro | Mara Vargas | August 10, 2018 |
| 9 | 9 | "TULIP (symb. hope)" | Manolo Caro | Gabriel Nuncio | August 10, 2018 |
| 10 | 10 | "TUSSILAGO (symb. worries)" | Manolo Caro | Monika Revilla, Mara Vargas, Gabriel Nuncio | August 10, 2018 |
| 11 | 11 | "ORCHID (symb. Lust)" | Manolo Caro | Monika Revilla | August 10, 2018 |
| 12 | 12 | "SISYMBRIUM (symb. adversity)" | Manolo Caro | Mara Vargas | August 10, 2018 |
| 13 | 13 | "POPPY (symb. resurrection)" | Manolo Caro | Manolo Caro | August 10, 2018 |

=== Season 2 (2019) ===
| No. overall | No. in season | Title | Directed by | Written by | Original release date |
|---|---|---|---|---|---|
| 14 | 1 | "ROSE (symb unity)" | Manolo Caro | Manolo Caro | October 18, 2019 |
| 15 | 2 | "IRIS (symb. faith)" | Manolo Caro | Mara Vargas | October 18, 2019 |
| 16 | 3 | "LOTUS (symb. mystery)" | Manolo Caro & Alberto Belli | Gabriel Nuncio | October 18, 2019 |
| 17 | 4 | "ALMOND (symb. awaken)" | Alberto Belli | Hipatia Argüero Mendoza | October 18, 2019 |
| 18 | 5 | "ACACIA (symb. secret love)" | Santiago Limón | Alexandro Aldrete | October 18, 2019 |
| 19 | 6 | "CLOVES (symb, capricious)" | Yibrán Asuad | Hipatia Argüero Mendoza | October 18, 2019 |
| 20 | 7 | "GERANIUM (symb. counsel)" | Yibrán Asuad | Gabriel Nuncio | October 18, 2019 |
| 21 | 8 | "HELICONIA (symb. fertility)" | Manolo Caro | Alexandro Aldrete | October 18, 2019 |
| 22 | 9 | "PANSY (symb. reflection)" | Manolo Caro | Manolo Caro | October 18, 2019 |

=== Special (2019) ===
The special episode, published on Netflix separate to the series as a short film, was released on November 1, 2019, or Día de muertos. It shows the funeral of Virginia and also connects other plot points from the second season.

| No. overall | No. in season | Title | Directed by | Written by | Original release date |
|---|---|---|---|---|---|
| 23 | 1 | "The Funeral" | Manolo Caro | Mara Vargas | November 1, 2019 |
At Virginia's funeral, Paulina confronts her late mother's band of "best friends" in the face of their homophobia and transphobia towards her family, while Ernesto has to find a way to bring her coffin into Mexico from Houston; the rest of the family experience a series of chance encounters.

=== Season 3 (2020) ===
| No. overall | No. in season | Title | Directed by | Written by | Original release date |
|---|---|---|---|---|---|
| 24 | 1 | "PETUNIA (symb. cunning)" | Manolo Caro | Mara Vargas Jackson | April 23, 2020 |
| 25 | 2 | "SUNFLOWER (symb. power)" | Manolo Caro, Yibran Asuad & Gabriel Nuncio | Mara Vargas, Alexandro Aldrete & Gabriel Nuncio | April 23, 2020 |
| 26 | 3 | "GERBERA (symb. first love)" | Manolo Caro, Gabriel Nuncio & Yibran Asuad | Alexandro Aldrete | April 23, 2020 |
| 27 | 4 | "MALLOW (symb. ambition)" | Yibran Asuad, Manolo Caro & Gabriel Nuncio | Gabriel Nuncio | April 23, 2020 |
| 28 | 5 | "AZALEA (symb. temperance)" | Manolo Caro | Hipatia Argüero & Kim Torres | April 23, 2020 |
| 29 | 6 | "BETONY (symb. surprise)" | Manolo Caro & Yibran Asuad | Hipatia Argüero | April 23, 2020 |
| 30 | 7 | "CLOVER (symb. revenge)" | Yibran Asuad | Hipatia Argüero | April 23, 2020 |
| 31 | 8 | "COHOSH (symb. scandal)" | Yibran Asuad, Manolo Caro & Gabriel Nuncio | Gabriel Nuncio | April 23, 2020 |
| 32 | 9 | "HYACINTH (symb. jealousy)" | Yibran Asuad, Manolo Caro & Gabriel Nuncio | Alexandro Aldrete | April 23, 2020 |
| 33 | 10 | "ELFDOCK (symb. tears)" | Yibran Asuad | Mara Vargas Jackson | April 23, 2020 |
| 34 | 11 | "LAUREL (symb. glory)" | Manolo Caro | Manolo Caro | April 23, 2020 |

== Sources ==
- Rotten Tomatoes (2018). "The House of Flowers (La Casa De Las Flores): Season 1". Rotten Tomatoes.
- Davis, Arianna (September 23, 2019). "The Trailer for House of Flowers a.k.a. La Casa de Las Flores Season 2 is Hilarious". O, The Oprah Magazine.
- Puentes, Patricia (2019c). "La casa de las flores 2: Todo lo que necesitas saber de su nueva temporada" [La casa de las flores 2: All you need to know about the new season]. CNET en Español (in Spanish).
- Netflix (March 17, 2020). "Breaking News - The Final Season of "La Casa de las Flores" Is Back on April 23, Mis Queridos" – via The Futon Critic.
