= David Ostrosky =

Mexican actor (1956–2023)

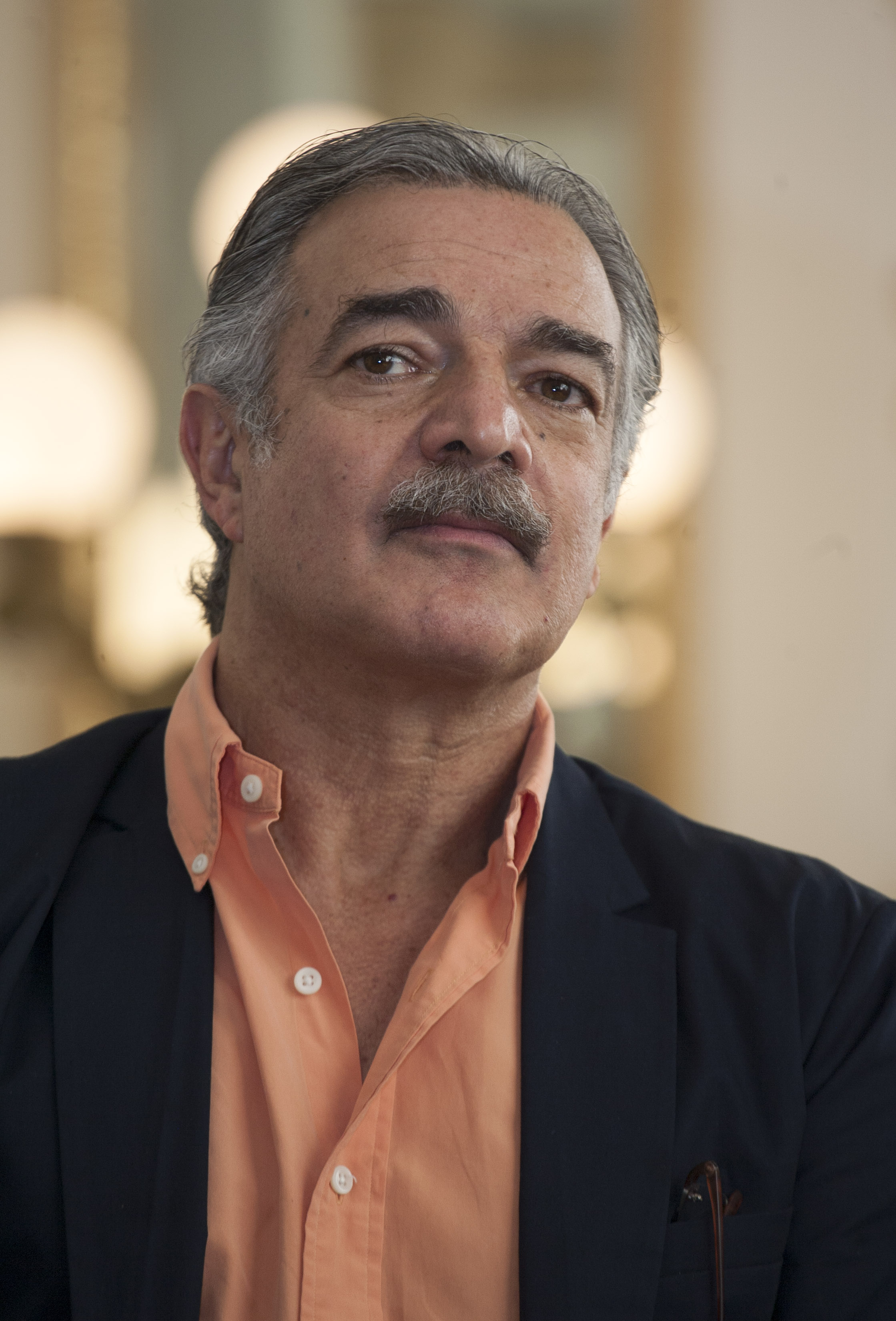
- Ostrosky in 2014
- Born: 1 December 1956; Mexico City, Mexico
- Died: 17 August 2023 (aged 66)
- Occupation: Actor
- Parent(s): Don Pedro Ostrosky; Doña Gueña Vinograd

David Ostrosky Vinograd (1 December 1956 – 17 August 2023) was a Mexican actor.

== Life and career ==
David Ostrosky Vinograd was born on 1 December 1956 in Mexico City, Mexico, and was of Jewish descent. His father, Pedro Ostrosky, was Lithuanian Jewish from Kyiv, Ukraine, and his mother Gueña Vinograd was from Poland.

Ostrosky was known for his moustache, and for appearing in numerous telenovelas, and plays in Mexico City.

David Ostrosky died on 17 August 2023, at the age of 66.

== Filmography ==
=== Films ===
| Year | Title | Roles |
|---|---|---|
| 1990 | Triste recuerdo | Maria's husband |
| 1991 | Like Water for Chocolate | Juan de la Garza |
| 1999 | La segunda noche | Saul |
| 2007 | My Mexican Shivah | Ricardo |
| 2021 | The House of Flowers: The Movie | Dr. Salomón Cohen |

=== Television ===
| Year | Title | Roles |
|---|---|---|
| 1984 | Principessa | Juan Carlos |
| 1987 | Rosa Salvaje | Carlos |
| 1989 | Teresa | Willy |
| 1989 | Simplemente Maria | Rodrigo de Peñalvert |
| 1991 | Alcanzar una estrella II | Roberto |
| 1992 | María Mercedes | Dr. Muñoz |
| 1993 | Valentina | Diego |
| 1994 | Agujetas de color de rosa | Víctor Manuel |
| 1995 | María la del Barrio | Zabala |
| 1996 | Marisol | Mariano |
| 1996 | La antorcha encendida | Mariano Abasolo |
| 1997 | Alguna vez tendremos alas | Dr. Ricardo Aguilera |
| 1997 | El secreto de Alejandra | Rubén |
| 1998 | El diario de Daniela | Gustavo Corona |
| 2000 | Carita de ángel | Dr. Velasco |
| 2000 | La casa en la playa | César Villareal |
| 2001 | El derecho de nacer | José Rivera |
| 2001 | Sin pecado concebido | Enrique |
| 2001 | El juego de la vida | Rafael |
| 2002 | ¡Vivan los niños! | Dr. Bernardo Arias |
| 2003 | Bajo la misma piel | Jaime Sandoval |
| 2004 | Amy, la nińa de la mochila azul | Sebastián Hinojosa |
| 2005 | Alborada | Agustín de Corsa |
| 2006 | Duelo de Pasiones | Elías Bernal |
| 2007 | Destilando Amor | Eduardo Saldívar |
| 2008 | Central de abastos | Jimena's father |
| 2008 | En nombre del amor | Dr. Rodolfo Bermúdez |
| 2009 | Alma de hierro | Alonso |
| 2010 | Soy tu dueña | Moisés Macotela |
| 2011 | Cuando me enamoro | Benjamín Casillas |
| 2011 | Una familia con suerte | Ernesto Quesada |
| 2012 | Un refugio para el amor | Claudio |
| 2012–2013 | Porque el Amor Manda | Lic. Astudillo |
| 2013 | Por siempre mi amor | Gilberto Cervantes |
| 2014 | Hasta el fin del mundo | Maestro Coria |
| 2018 | La casa de las flores | Dr. Salomón Cohen |
| 2022 | Vencer la ausencia | Homero Funes |
| 2024 | La mujer de mi vida (American TV series) | Celestino Castro |

== Plays/Theatre ==
- Piaf (2015/2016) as Louis Barriere
