= Roberta Lobeira Alanís =

Mexican painter (born 1979)

- Born: June 25, 1979 (age 45); Monterrey, Mexico
- Other names: Roberta Lobeira
- Occupation(s): Visual artist, painter
- Known for: Magical realist and surrealist paintings

Roberta Lobeira Alanís, also known as Roberta Lobeira (born June 25, 1979, in Monterrey, Mexico), is a Mexican painter and visual artist. She works in artistic genres such as magical realism and surrealism.

== Early life and education ==
Roberta Lobeira Alanis is a Mexican painter born on June 25, 1979, in Monterrey, Nuevo León, Mexico. She started painting at an early age when she was five, with art lessons in her home town. She continued her studies with an arts major degree at the University of Monterrey, then at the New York Academy of Art and at the School of Visual Arts in New York City.

== Career ==
She is currently an independent artist. Lobeira has also lived, studied, and worked in New York, California, Oaxaca, Paris, Mexico City and, Spain.

Her surreal and magical style has been influenced by artists such as René Magritte, Salvador Dalí, Leonora Carrington, and Remedios Varo. Also influenced by other artistic movements such as pop surrealism and magical realism.

She has had art shows in Mexico, USA, and Spain. Her work was last shown in 2022 at "El Triunfo de la Pintura" in La Pinacoteca de Nuevo León and the show "Art of the Present Future" in Madrid.

Lobeira's work includes the Family Portraits (2018–2020) made for La Casa de las Flores, a TV series directed by Manolo Caro on Netflix. She is known for her large format paintings of imaginary worlds with fantastic characters and landscapes, inspired in nature with a poetic style of expression in which nature becomes unnatural and surreal.

She recently featured her work at Estampa 2021 in Madrid with Reiners Contemporary Art Gallery, and with the NFT platform Vira in Art Basel Miami.

== Art projects ==
Some of her other projects include:

- 2022: Solo show "Retrouvailles", La Pinacoteca de Nuevo Leon, Monterrey, México.
- 2022: Art show "Art of the Present Future" Chapter No. 2, Madrid, Spain.
- 2022: Art show "Objeto Femenino", Madrid, Spain
- 2022: Art show "Art of the Present Future" Chapter No. 1, Madrid, Spain.
- 2021: NFT for VIRA Platform, Art Basel, Miami, USA.
- 2021: Art fair "Estampa Madrid" with Reiners Contemporary Art Gallery, Madird, Spain.
- 2021: Campaign for "Starlite 10th Anniversary", Marbella, Spain.
- 2021-2022: Art show "El Triunfo de la Pintura", La Pinacoteca de Nuevo Leon, Monterrey, México.
- 2021: "La Casa de las Flores: La Pelicula", introduction design.
- 2018-2021: Artwork shown in the three seasons of "La Casa de las Flores" series directed by Manolo Caro for Netflix.
- 2018: Art auction "Painting Bridges", United Nations, New York City, NY, USA.
- 2013: Work shown in the Mexican film "No se si cortarme las venas o dejarmelas largas," written and directed by Manolo Caro.
- 2012: Solo Show, "Romanic Mind", Museo del Centernario, Monterrey, Nuevo Leon, Mexico.
- 2012: Art show "Art Takes Times Square", New York City, NY, USA.
- 2010-2012: Art shows, Project Paz, 82 Mercer St, New York City, NY, USA.
- 2006: Art show, School of Visual Arts, New York City, NY, USA.
- 2005: Art show "Feel Grow", Monterrey, NL, Mexico.
- 2003: Art show, Casino Monterrey, Monterrey, NL, Mexico.
- 2002: Art show "Expresa la Mujer", Dataflux, Monterrey, Mexico.
- 2001: Art show "Hijos de la Gubia", UDEM, Monterrey, NL, Mexico.
- 2000: Art show "NYC@MTY", Cachagua, Monterrey, NL, Mexico.
- 1999: Art show, Club Deportivo San Agustín, Monterrey, NL, Mexico.

== See also ==
- Salvador Dalí
