= La hija pródiga =

Mexican telenovela

- Genre: Telenovela
- Created by: José Ignacio Valenzuela
- Directed by: Salvador Aguirre; Pablo Gómez Sáenz
- Starring: Isabel Burr; Christian de la Campa; Alejandro Camacho
- Country of origin: Mexico
- Original language: Spanish
- No. of episodes: 66

Production
- Executive producer: Ana Celia Urquidi
- Camera setup: Multi-camera
- Production company: TV Azteca

Original release
- Network: Azteca Uno
- Release: October 23, 2017 – January 21, 2018

Related
- El secreto de Feriha; Maral

La hija pródiga is a Mexican telenovela that premiered on Azteca Uno on October 23, 2017, is an original story by José Ignacio Valenzuela produced by Ana Celia Urquidi for TV Azteca, which stars Isabel Burr and Christian de la Campa. The series follows the Montejo family. On a trip their eldest daughter, Alicia (Isabel Burr), disappears without explanation. After learning to live with the loss, 20 years later the girl reappears and changes the life of each member of her family.

== Plot ==
The story begins when the daughter of the Montejo's, Alicia (Isabel Burr), is kidnapped in Acapulco, while her parents are absent for an important business dinner. The girl accompanied by her sister Pamela (Andrea Martí), is subtracted provoking a great sadness in her family for years.

Twenty years later, when her family has been able to resume their lives, Alicia reappears at Montejo's house to find answers. This fact will unleash a series of conflicts between the family because Alicia only seeks the truth and in this quest will find love in Salvador (Christian de la Campa), the betrothed of his sister, provoking a love triangle that will lead us to witness the obstacles that Alicia must cross to find out who or who were to blame for his tragedy.

== Cast ==
- Isabel Burr as Alicia Montejo
- Christian de la Campa as Salvador Mendoza
- Alejandro Camacho as Rogelio Montejo
- Leonardo Daniel as Federico Campomanes
- Andrea Martí as Pamela Montejo
- Carmen Delgado as Lucha
- Aura Cristina Geithner as Isabel
- Sharis Cid as Delia
- Aldo Gallardo as Arturo Montejo
- María Adelaida Puerta as Beatriz Castellanos
- Rodolfo Arias as Jacobo
- Marcelo Buquet as Antonio
- Ramiro Huerta as Emilio
- Martha Mariana Castro as Nora
- Diana Quijano as Matilde Rojas
- Eligio Meléndez as Edgar
- Pakey Vazquez as Jack
- Adianez Hernández as Virginia
- Francisco Angelini as José
- Leon Michel as Padre Damián
- Jack Duarte as Dany Mendoza
- Saul Hernández as Lalo Montejo
- Joan Kuri as Blas Montejo
- Dahanna Dhenider as Marifer Mendoza
- Iván Cortes as Abel
- Ethan as Carlitos
- Fernando Luján as Nelson
- Carmen Baqué as La Guera
- Hugo Catalán as Beto
