= Ramon Lobato =

Ramon Lobato is an Australian author, researcher, and scholar of cultural industries. The focus of his research is on video distribution networks, and how they structure audience access, discovery, and content diversity. He is currently Associate Professor of Media and Communication at RMIT University in Melbourne, Australia.

== Education ==
Lobato studied at the University of Melbourne, receiving a Bachelor of Arts in cinema studies in 2006 and a PhD in cultural studies in 2010. His PhD thesis, "Subcinema: Mapping Informal Film Distribution", investigated the international dynamics of piracy and informal distribution.

== Career ==
Lobato is known for his work on film piracy and digital video distribution. His first book, Shadow Economies of Cinema: Mapping Informal Film Distribution (British Film Institute, 2012) explored the centrality of informal and pirate networks to everyday film cultures around the world. Writing in Cinema Journal, Neves observed that Shadow Economies of Cinema "moves scholarly attention to critical issues of access, aspiration, and innovation, and to the actually existing practices and channels that serve billions of users—many of which are disappeared or disconnected by the continued focus on formal, legal, and official structures”.

In 2015 Lobato published the co-authored book The Informal Media Economy (Polity, 2015, with Julian Thomas), which used theories of economic informality to explain how media systems evolve. Examples discussed in the book include fansubbing, piracy, games, UGC, and parallel-imported books and videos. Prof Michael Curtin of UC Santa Barbara described the book as offering “lucid, thoughtful and provocative insights regarding topics that are absolutely central to media industry studies today”.

In 2019 Lobato published Netflix Nations: The Geography of Digital Distribution (NYU Press), which analyses the international roll-out of Netflix between 2010 and 2016, and its implications for global media audiences and regulators. Reviewers noted how the book "re-centers the importance of geographic and spatial logics in the study of digitally distributed media" (Quarterly Review of Film and Video) and "meticulously details the complicated global ecology of Internet-distributed television" (International Journal of Communication).

Before his career in research Lobato worked for Beat Magazine as a music reporter and Sensis as an associate editor. After receiving his PhD in 2010 Lobato joined Swinburne University of Technology as a senior research fellow in the Institute for Social Research, where he was involved in several projects pertaining to media policies and technology. During this time he also taught in the university's cinema and screen studies program, where he developed classes for both the program and the School of Arts, Social Science and Humanities.

Alongside Amanda Lotz, Lobato co-founded the Global Internet TV Consortium, a network of media scholars who research the impact of internet-distributed television worldwide.

Lobato serves on the editorial board for International Journal of Cultural Studies and Media Industries Journal.

In 2019 Lobato received an ARC Future Fellowship from the Australian Research Council for a project on the cultural impacts of smart TVs in Australia. He was elected a Fellow of the Australian Academy of the Humanities in 2025.

== Bibliography ==
=== Books ===
- Shadow Economies of Cinema: Mapping Informal Film Distribution (British Film Institute, 2012)
- The Informal Media Economy (with Julian Thomas, Polity, 2015)
- Netflix Nations (New York University Press, 2019)

=== Edited collections ===
- Amateur Media: Social, Cultural, and Legal Perspectives (with Dan Hunter, Megan Richardson, and Julian Thomas, Routledge, 2013)
- Geoblocking and Global Video Culture (with James Meese, Institute of Network Cultures, 2016)

=== Select journal articles ===
- "Creative Industries and Informal Economies: Lessons from Nollywood" (International Journal of Cultural Studies, 2010)
- "Histories of User-Generated Content: Between Formal and Informal Media Economies" (with Julian Thomas and Dan Hunter, International Journal of Communication, 2015)
- "The Cultural Logic of Digital Intermediaries: YouTube Multichannel Networks (MCNs)" (Convergence, 2016)
