= Hasta que te conocí (TV series) =

Mexican biographical television series

- Genre: Drama
- Written by: Raúl Olivares; Denis Languérand; Caroline Vera; Alfredo Mendoza; Héctor Barrios; Elía Marín Govea
- Directed by: Álvaro Curiel, Rigoberto Castañeda
- Starring: See list
- Narrated by: Julián Román
- Countries of origin: Mexico; United States
- Original language: Spanish
- No. of seasons: 1
- No. of episodes: 13

Production
- Executive producers: Juan Gabriel; Francisco Cordero; Mary Black-Suarez; Fernando Barbosa; Leonardo Aranguibel; Luis Villanueva
- Producer: Mariano Carranco
- Production locations: Atlixco, Puebla; Puebla, Puebla; Patzcuaro, Michoacán; Tzintzuntzan, Michoacán; Mexico City
- Cinematography: Jero Rod-García; Jorge Franco; Santiago Sánchez
- Editor: Camilo Abadia

Original release
- Network: TNT Latin America
- Release: April 18 – June 27, 2016

Hasta que te conocí is a Mexican biographical television series premiered on TNT Latin America on April 18, 2016, and concluded on June 27, 2016. Based on exclusive interviews of Mary Black-Suárez, the series follows the life of Juan Gabriel from his childhood to his last adulthood. Produced by Somos Productions and BTF Media and distributed by Disney Media Distribution Latin America and Somos Distribution. It stars Julián Román as the titular character.

== Plot ==
"Hasta que te conocí", is a drama series that follows the steps of Alberto Aguilera Valadez, towards his dream to fame. A tour of 13 episodes based on unpublished evidence that reveals, as never before, the life of the Divo of Juarez: Juan Gabriel. A story that tells how his talent led him to defy his fate and overcome poverty, betrayals and prejudices, to become Juan Gabriel, the most beloved musical icon in Latin America.

== Cast ==
- Julián Román as Juan Gabriel
- Carlos Elías Yorvick as Teen Alberto Aguilera Valadez / Adán Luna "Juan Gabriel" #2 (17 to 20 years old)
- Alejandro Flores as Teen Alberto #1 (13 years old)
- Matías del Castillo as Child Alberto #3 (8 years old)
- Ricardo Zertuche as Child Alberto #2 (5 years old)
- Nohek Yoali as Child Alberto #1 (3 years old)
- Dolores Heredia as Victoria Valadez
- Marco Treviño as Eduardo Magallanes
- Damayanti Quintanar as Virginia Aguilera Valadez
- Irán Castillo as María Romero
- Verónica Merchant as Esperanza Mcculley
- Luz Treviño as Meche
- Geraldine Galván as Young Virginia Aguilera Valadez
- Verónica Langer as Micaela Alvarado
- Alejandro Calva as Enrique Okamura
- Ernesto Gómez Cruz as Juan "Juanito" Contreras
- Tenoch Huerta as Nereo
- Andrés Palacios as Daniel Mijares
- Sofía Espinosa as Lola Beltrán
- Ricardo Korkowski as Federico Juarez
- Juan Ríos as David Bencomo
- Andrea Santibañez as Angélica María
- Julio Bracho as General Andrés Puentes
- Michel Chauvet as Manuel Alvarado
- Giovanna Zacarías as Lucha Villa
- Gabriela Roel as Doña Brígida
- Pablo Azar as Young Gabriel Aguilera
- Renée Lavalle as Lupita
- Cassandra Aguilar as Daniela Romo
- Isabel Burr as Verónica Castro
- Paloma Ruiz de Alda as Rocío Dúrcal

== Broadcast ==
The series premiered on April 18, 2016, throughout Latin America on TNT. It was confirmed by Telemundo on May 2, 2016, that the series would be airing on the network. The series premiered on Telemundo on September 11, 2016

== Episodes ==
No.	Title	Original release date
1	"El recién llegado"	April 18, 2016
In 1929, a young Victoria lives in Parácuaro, Michoacan and is about to commit to the wealthy Manuel. But, she meets Gabriel and her world turns completely. She has do pick between following her heart, or heeding the requests of her mother, Doña Brigida, who wishes to marry her daughter into a better life. Victoria chooses to follow her heart and marries Gabriel. She lives happily for a few years although she loses four children. Soon, she has five children and cannot provide for them all. Victoria and Gabriel live in poverty and thus her happy days become bitter. With trials and unfulfilled promises, Victoria seeks to get ahead but her past and her husband's strange behaviour exhaust their options and corner her into a painful life. Everything is complicated even more by the arrival of a new member of the family.
2	"Adiós papá"	April 18, 2016
When Gabriel sets fire to much of Parácuaro's fields, due to his mental illness, the population demands justice. Gabriel is sent to Mexico City to an asylum while Victoria faces the derision of the town alone. Their humble economic situation becomes alarming, as no one wants to give her work and no one feels sorry for a woman with six children to feed. On the contrary, Victoria receives insinuations and bad proposals, humiliations and public confrontations. So, with a very dark present, Victoria takes a hard decision that will forever mark her destiny and that of her family: to migrate to the unknown Ciudad Juárez in search of a future that will allow her to start a new life.
3	"Un mundo nuevo"	April 25, 2016
1950. Victoria and her family arrive in Ciudad Juárez looking to start a new life. The modern frontier is far from the Michoacan countryside, so Victoria must adapt quickly to move her children forward. The precarious economic situation forces the Aguilera to work long hours, where Victoria and Virginia become pretenders, and have less and less time to care for little Alberto, only six months old. Immersed in a difficult situation, facing a new world that dazzles her, Victoria makes the most difficult decision of her life and chooses to seek a better life for Alberto, so she sends him away to an orphanage. When his sister pleads to get him back, the nuns tell her that the child never made it into the building. The last shot is of Alberto alone in the streets while an elderly woman asks him where his mother is.
4	"Todo está perdido"	May 2, 2016
An elderly woman who suffers from her mental faculties uses Alberto to earn a living in the streets. In the meantime, his family is desperately looking for him when he is dead. When Alberto returns home, everyone promises to take better care of him. However, the border life demands much more effort than the field, and the Aguilera can not take care of the child properly. At least, not without neglecting what they need so much: their jobs, their partners, their lives. In this way, Victoria is forced to make another harsh decision for the welfare of her son, although this will cause a wound so deep that it will be very difficult to heal.
5	"La jaula del Palomo"	May 9, 2016
Alberto has been surviving for two years to forget his family. Life has been hard inside the Tribunal and it has cost him much to adapt to the discipline and the violent conditions that prevail there. Nevertheless he manages to become a good friend, Hugo, and a mentor, Juanito, with whom he discovers that the closure is more bearable when accompanied. He also realizes that music is a taste that transports him to a reality where he is safe, calm and very happy. Thus, the tiredness of confinement is slowed by long hours of musical learning and childhood mischief. But that does not fill it, then one day he takes courage and decides to play his last card to go after his happiness: he must escape.
6	"El precio de la libertad"	May 16, 2016
When escaping from the Court, Alberto is rejected by his mother but persuades Juanito to receive him at home, as long as he earns his life honorably. So, go to Virginia and help him sell his burritos on the street. In one of those days he meets the world of gospel, a new musical school that leads him to live in California, under a religious atmosphere where everything is new and everything is learned. But Alberto misses Mexico and returns to Juárez by truck, with a musical group that fills his dreams of living from singing. Once in Juarez, Gabriel, his brother, seeks him to take him with his mother to Parácuaro, where Alberto feels trapped again. The disenchantment is consummated with a familiar face in which Alberto decides to live life in his own way, so he must break ties with his family forever.
7	"Primera llamada"	May 23, 2016
Alberto knows in Mexico Tomás, a carefree young man who fixes his eyes on the singer and takes him to live in his house. But he also discovers the lack of love and the results of the wasted opportunities, so he returns to Ciudad Juárez, immersed in a halo of discontent. Alberto is looking for an opportunity to sing in a nightclub, and eventually sneaks into the Noa Noa. There he discovers Meche's brotherhood, one of the files of the place that leads him to live in his humble hotel and introduces him to his friends, who welcome him as if he were one of his family, a passenger, as everything in his life. The good star of Alberto is peeping out, his name is becoming known and his first great public opportunity appears: local television.
8	"El sueño de vivir"	May 30, 2016
Alberto's economy is stable and the name of Adán Luna begins to gain strength. But a twist of fate leaves him jobless and estranged from Esperanza McCulley. Then he meets up with Noa Noa and his old friends: a magical night that turns him into an offer from a record company in Mexico City. As much as Alberto loves his people, and feels comfortable working in the Noa Noa, he knows perfect that his dreams and his talent are bigger than what the border can offer him. So Alberto decides to take the bull by the horns and, accompanied by his guitar and his dream of recording a record, travels to the Mexican capital to meet the hard truth that surrounds the musical world.
9	"Camino a la fama"	June 6, 2016
Alberto accepts any job in order to stay in Mexico and to be able to record his album. Soon after, he meets with Nereo, who contacts him with Enrique Okamura, an executive of the RCA label. Alberto manages to audition for the executive but, despite his talent, the singer only manages to be considered for choirs. He is happy, his dream begins to materialize. Time passes and Alberto positions himself as a showgirl on the record label, but his nobility and naivety will play a trick on him and put him in a dangerous situation that threatens not only the achievement of his dream, but his life.
10	"La luna ya se metió"	June 13, 2016
After the false accusation of robbery, Alberto is admitted to the prison of Lecumberri, a terrible place that receives his tenants with a characteristic smell of death and suffering. Alone and frightened, Alberto strives to keep himself safe, with a high mood and a distant depression. Over time, and thanks to his talent and charisma, Alberto finds himself in this inhospitable atmosphere of the hand of Ofelia, the wife Of the director of the prison, General Puentes. She, together with singer Queta Jiménez, "LaPrieta Linda", will do everything in their power to free Alberto from this life of oppression before it is too late.
11	"Se acabó el después"	June 20, 2016
After leaving Lecumberri, Alberto goes to live in the house of the Puentes by invitation of Ofelia, without permission of the General. The days go by and Alberto gains the affections of the family and the suspicion of the General, who sees his delicacy and freedom as a red spot for the education of his children and ends up throwing him. Alberto goes to live in a house of assistance, where he meets Jesus Salas, who becomes his most faithful friend from that moment. Alberto records his first album, is immersed in a new world, which he always dreamed of. At last his talent is being valued at the level he always wanted. When everything seems to be going well, Alberto realizes that he can not go much further if he does not face his past: his mother.
12	"El Divo"	June 27, 2016
Alberto and Victoria make contact after a long time, but the young man discovers with sadness that his mother still prefers him far. Alberto embarks on a long season of presentations that take him to the foreigner and to the most remote towns of Mexico, where he continues his apprenticeship of the trade and he is reunited with his past. His vision of life is tuned, personally and labor, and begins to think of forgiveness, harmony, and put the cheek again and again. His career is on the rise, he becomes a sales magnet and all the greats want to record him. Everything seems to be going well, when terrible news shakes him to the bone.
13	"Hasta que te conocí"	June 27, 2016

== Awards and nominations ==
Year	Award	Category	Recipient	Result
2017	45th International Emmy Awards	Non-English U.S. Primetime Program	Hasta que te conocí	Nominated
2017	Produ Awards	Director - Serie, Superserie or Telenovela of the Year	Álvaro Curiel	Nominated
2017	Produ Awards	Director of photography - Serie, Superserie or Telenovela of the Year	Jerónimo Rodríguez	Won
2017	Produ Awards	Productor - Serie, Superserie or Telenovela of the Year	Fernando Barbosa & Leonardo Aranguibel	Won
2017	Produ Awards	Lead Actor - Serie, Superserie or Telenovela of the Year	Julián Román	Nominated
2017	Produ Awards	Lead Actress - Serie, Superserie or Telenovela of the Year	Dolores Heredia	Won
2017	Produ Awards	Supporting Actor - Serie, Superserie or Telenovela of the Year	Ernesto Gómez Cruz	Won
2017	Produ Awards	Supporting Actor - Serie, Superserie or Telenovela of the Year	Marco Treviño	Nominated
2017	Produ Awards	Supporting Actor - Serie, Superserie or Telenovela of the Year	Irán Castillo	Nominated
2017	Produ Awards	Supporting Actor - Serie, Superserie or Telenovela of the Year	Dayamanti Quintanar	Nominated
2017	Produ Awards	Supporting Actor - Serie, Superserie or Telenovela of the Year	Gabriela Roel	Nominated
2017	Produ Awards	Supporting Actor - Serie, Superserie or Telenovela of the Year	María Rojo	Won
2017	Produ Awards	Revelation Actor - Serie, Superserie or Telenovela of the Year	Carlos Yorvick	Nominated
2017	Produ Awards	Revelation Actress - Serie, Superserie or Telenovela of the Year	Geraldine Galván	Nominated
2017	Produ Awards	Serie of the Year	Hasta que te conocí	Nominated
2017	Produ Awards	Fiction Program - Transmedia Use of the Year	Hasta que te conocí	Nominated
