= Paul Julian Smith =

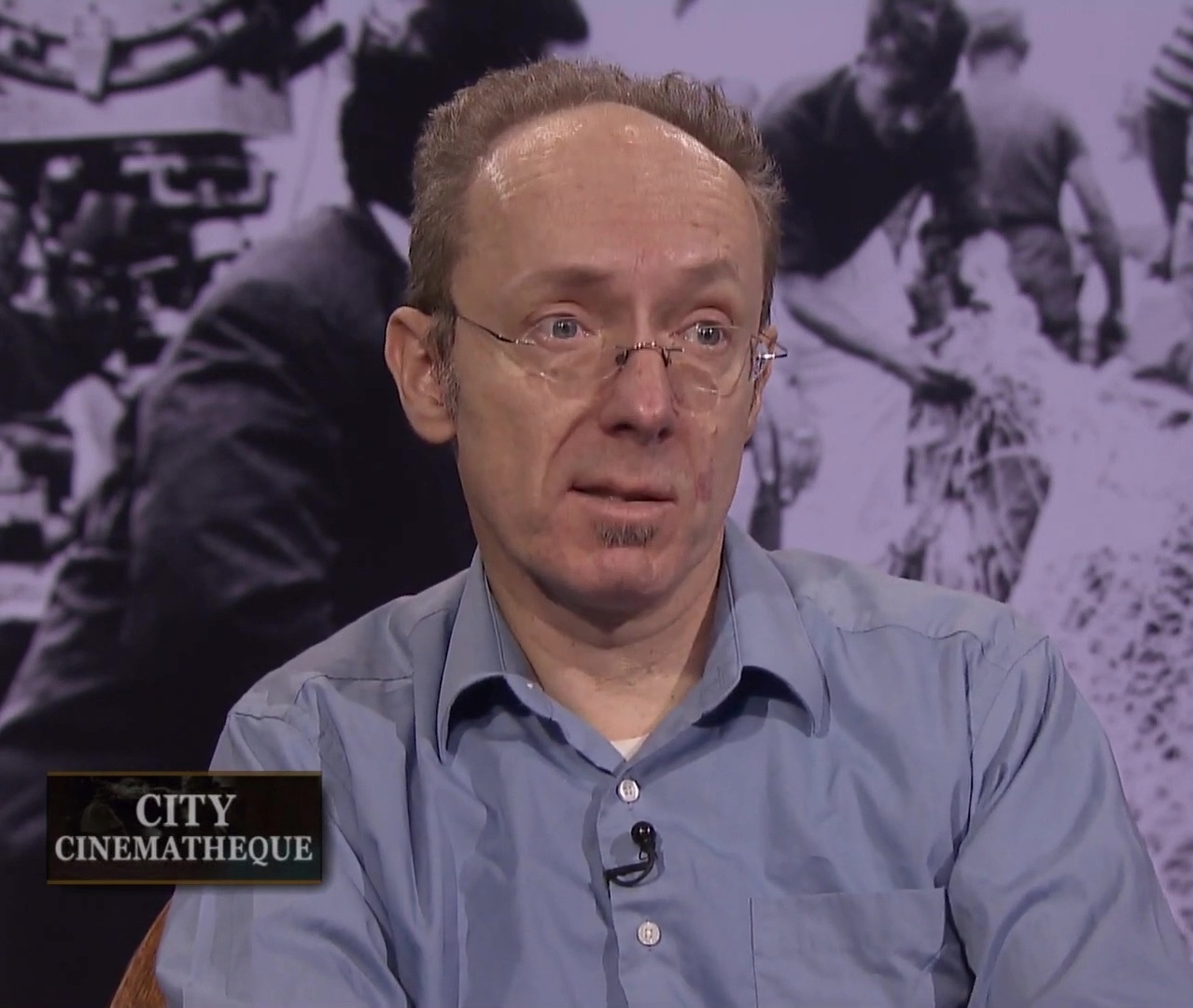
Smith on CUNY TV's City Cinematheque, 2011

Paul Julian Smith is a university professor specializing in Spanish and Mexican cinema and television. He is also a film critic.

He is currently a Distinguished Professor of Hispanic studies at the Graduate Center of the City University of New York.

He is a regular contributor on Spanish-language film for the British Film Institute magazine Sight & Sound and was a columnist for Film Quarterly

== Career ==
Smith was the Professor of Spanish at Cambridge University between 1991 and September 2010.

He was elected a fellow of The British Academy in 2008.

In 2010 he joined the CUNY Graduate Center as Distinguished Professor.

Notable works include Writing in the Margin, the first systematic application of poststructuralist critical theory to literature of the Spanish Golden Age; The Moderns: Time, Space, and Subjectivity in Contemporary Spanish Culture, a study of Spanish urban space; and a biography of Spanish film director Pedro Almodóvar, Desire Unlimited: The Cinema of Pedro Almodóvar
