= The House of Flowers season 2 =

2019 Mexican television season

The House of Flowers
- Season 2
- Starring: Cecilia Suárez; Aislinn Derbez; Darío Yazbek Bernal; Arturo Ríos; Paco León; Juan Pablo Medina
- No. of episodes: 9

Release
- Original network: Netflix
- Original release: October 18, 2019

Additional information
- Filming dates: February 5 – July 9, 2019

Season chronology
- ← Previous; Season 1 (release); El Funeral (chronology) Next → El Funeral (release); Season 3 (chronology)

The second season of The House of Flowers, a Mexican black comedy-drama television series about the privileged de la Mora family and their titular floristry shop, was released to Netflix in its entirety on October 18, 2019. The character Paulina de la Mora, played by Cecilia Suárez, becomes the main character. The season picks up a year after the end of the first season, and starts with Paulina learning of a challenge to her now-deceased mother Virginia's will and moving back to Mexico from Madrid. Paulina becomes overwhelmed trying to helm her family with different adversities along the way, while being mainly driven by revenge and unhappiness. The season had four directors, with the majority of episodes directed by show creator Manolo Caro, and written by Caro, Mara Vargas, Gabriel Nuncio, Hipatia Argüero Mendoza, and Alexandro Aldrete.

Filming began in Spain in February 2019, with the second and third seasons being produced together. Critical response to the season was not as good as the first season, but it still had various nominations at the Spanish Actors Union Awards and Platino Awards.

== Synopsis ==
Eight months before the outset of season 2, shortly after the events of season 1, Virginia dies. After her funeral, the children part ways – Paulina moves to Madrid to be with her ex-spouse, now-girlfriend María José; Elena becomes a successful architect; and Micaéla and Julián live at home. Ernesto, overcome by grief, joins a Scientology-esque scam cult. A challenge to Virginia's long-awaited will brings the siblings back together, Paulina returning from Spain to take care of business.

Paulina decides that she must honor her mother, support her siblings, and get revenge on Diego; to do all three, she has to re-purchase the florists from the Chiquis. She re-opens the cabaret, which Diego – reappearing in the family's life because he has been trying to reconnect with Julián – fronts the money for, so he can win back the de la Mora's family trust. Julián has had a child with his ex, Lucía, but Diego pays these bills, too. Paulina makes a sketchy deal with Julián's escort agency for the cabaret, but pins the deal to Diego in case it goes awry. She also meets a mysterious Catalan man called Alejo, who says he was a friend to her mother while both were receiving cancer treatment; though she tries to be suspicious, she ends up getting closer to him.

Meanwhile, Julián tries to find a proper job and reignites his relationship with Diego, but also works a rentboy hustle in secret. Ernesto rises the ranks in his cult, who impede on the family's life after their leader relocates her followers to their home. Micaéla, feeling alone with minimal parental guidance, has taken up magic tricks and enters the TV competition Talento México, taking Bruno as her guardian. When she gets through the rounds, Bruno asks his friend Moisés to join them and transform her into a singer; Bruno has also become enamored with a pretty teenage contestant.

Elena is trying to manage her position as a senior architect while being increasingly distracted by men, and realizes she has a relationship addiction. She begins attending a sex addicts' group therapy at a hair salon but starts a sexual relationship with someone there until discovering he is a priest. María José, after traveling to Mexico, finds happiness supporting the trans women and drag queens at the cabaret, who Paulina has been ignoring to work on her schemes. Their relationship fractures, and María José breaks up with Paulina and returns to Spain, being hounded by her overbearing sister. Paulina tries to call María José as she accepts Diego's innocence and loyalty to her family, handing herself in to the police for the soliciting at the cabaret.

== Cast ==
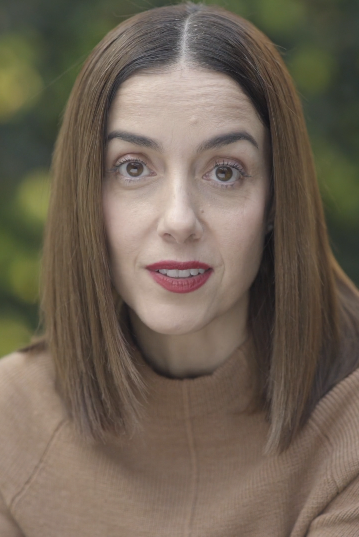
Cecilia Suárez, already a fan favorite, became the lead in season 2.

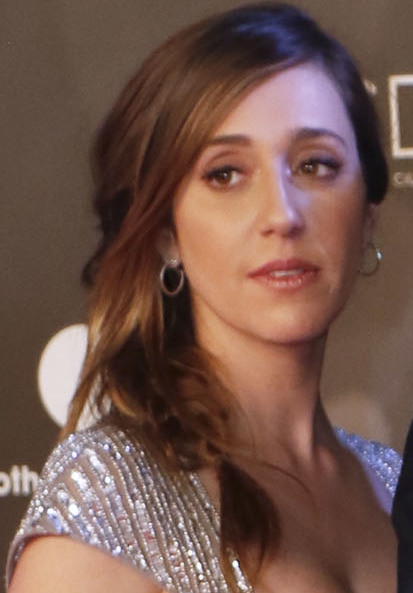
Mariana Treviño was added to the cast as villain Jenny Quetzal.

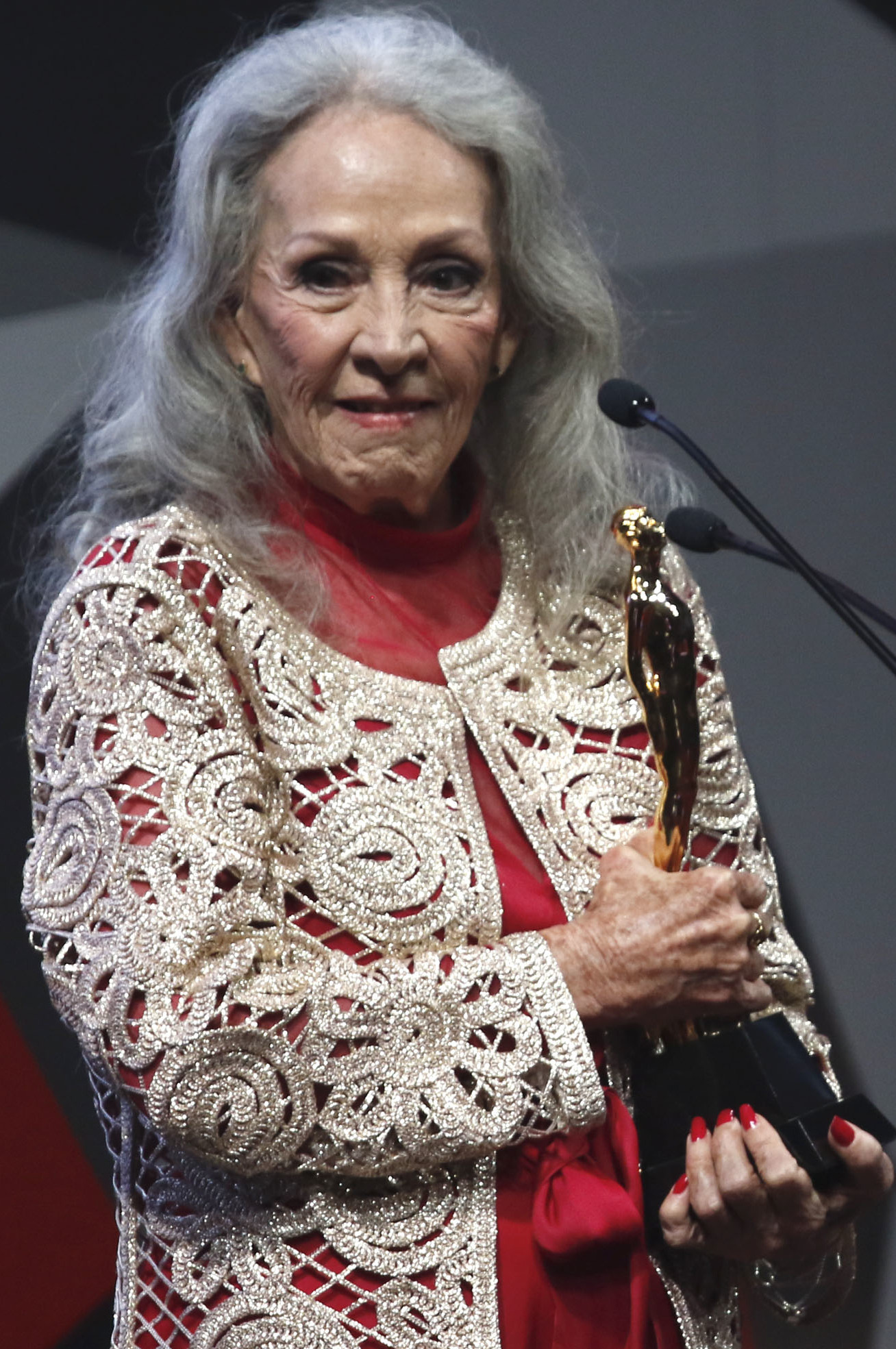
Isela Vega was a guest star in the season finale.

=== Main ===
- Cecilia Suárez as Paulina de la Mora, the neurotic eldest child who is constantly handling her family's problems and knows everyone's secrets
- Aislinn Derbez as Elena de la Mora, the ambitious middle child who has taken a high-level architect job while bouncing between poorly-chosen boyfriends
- Darío Yazbek Bernal as Julián de la Mora, the youngest child who has apparently fathered a child by ex Lucía, whom he tries to raise with fiancé Diego
- Paco León as María José Riquelme, Paulina's ex and the family's lawyer, a Spanish trans woman who cares a lot about her family
- Juan Pablo Medina as Diego Olvera, Julián's boyfriend, a consummate professional who buys the cabaret for Paulina, though she despises him
- Luis de la Rosa as Bruno Riquelme de la Mora, Paulina and María José's troublemaker teenage son who still tries to be a role model for Micaéla
- Arturo Ríos as Ernesto de la Mora, father of the de la Moras, a soft man who has been conned into giving his money and autonomy to a cult leader
- Verónica Langer as Carmela "Carmelita" Villalobos, a nosy but kind neighbor of the family
- Lucas Velázquez as Claudio Navarro, the son of Ernesto's mistress, a calm man who starts dating La Chiquis but prioritizes his half-sister, Micaéla
- Norma Angélica as Delia, the family's maid who keeps a nose in their business but adores Elena and is her confidante
- David Ostrosky as Dr. Salomón Cohen, the family psychiatrist and close friend who works with a sock puppet called Chuy
- Alexa de Landa as Micaéla Sánchez, the young daughter of Ernesto who enters a TV talent show performing magic and singing
- Sheryl Rubio as Lucía Dávila, a social climber and Julián's ex-girlfriend
- Natasha Dupeyrón as Ana Paula "La Chiquis" Corcuera, a blind young florist to whom Virginia sold 'La Casa de las Flores', she dates Claudio and employs Elena, but makes it hard for the family to buy back their shop
- Paco Rueda as Agustín "El Chiquis" Corcuera Jr., the smarmy brother of La Chiquis, who assists her
- Eduardo Rosa as Alejo Salvat, a charming Catalan man who seduces Paulina, but was in fact Virginia's lover in Houston who challenged the will
- Loreto Peralta as Rosita, a sweet teenage TV talent show contestant with whom Bruno is infatuated
- Mariana Treviño as Jenny Quetzal, the ruthless cult leader
- Flavio Medina as Simón, a sex-addicted priest who dates Elena
- Anabel Ferreira as Celeste, a hair stylist and the convener of Elena's sex therapy group

=== Recurring ===
- Claudette Maillé as Roberta Navarro, Ernesto's lover who committed suicide in season 1 and narrates the show
- María León as Purificación Riquelme, the obsessive sister of María José who is antagonistic towards Paulina
- Ismael Rodríguez as Jorge, the Amanda Miguel drag queen
- Pepe Marquez as Pepe/La Pau, the Paulina Rubio drag queen
- Katia Balmori as Mario, the Yuri drag queen
- Mariana Santos as Gloria, the Gloria Trevi drag queen
- Irving Peña as Alfonso "Poncho" Cruz, Carmelita's partner, who uses a wheelchair
- Michel Frías as Moisés Cohen, Bruno's friend who helps Micaéla with the talent show
- Hugo Catalán as Oliver, Julián's sugar daddy
- Ruth Ovseyevitz as Dora Cohen, Moi's mother and Salomón's sister, a friend to the de la Mora family
- David Chaviras as El Cacas, Ernesto's former cellmate whom he drags into the cult
- Roberto Flores as Pablo Pérez, a young architect and Elena's assistant
- Regina Orozco as Rosita's mother
- Teresa Ruiz as Marilu, an escort and businesswoman

=== Guest ===
- Eugenio Montessoro as Sr. Olvera, Diego's homophobic father
- Paloma Woolrich as Sra. Olvera, Diego's homophobic mother
- Manolo Caro as a news anchor
- Eduardo Casanova as Edu, the Riquelmes' neighbor in Madrid
- Gloria Trevi as herself, a talent show judge
- Salvador Pineda as Mauricio Pollo, a gambler who buys the cabaret cheap and turns it into a chicken shop
- Isela Vega as Victoria Aguirre, Virginia's bitter mother

== Production ==
=== Development ===
In August 2018, Castro announced that she would not reprise the role of Virginia for potential future seasons because she felt that her "character's journey is over." Caro confirmed a week later that Castro would no longer appear in the show, which would focus on the de la Mora children if another season was produced. Castro revealed in 2019 that, though the decision for her to leave was friendly and mutual between all parties, Caro and Netflix had originally asked to renew her contract for the second season to appear in only the first few episodes and then provide voice-overs; Castro would not agree to this, saying that she has always been all or nothing. As the writers had not developed a full storyline for her character, they all agreed there was not much left for her to do, a story confirmed by Caro. However, in 2020, Castro said that she had been finalizing her appearances in the second season with Netflix but Caro changed his mind on what he wanted, resulting in her being removed from the show. In August 2019, as the second season began releasing promotional materials, Castro confirmed that her likeness was used in the upcoming season, but that she hadn't been paid for the appearances because she had not done any additional work for it. In the second season, without Castro as the lead, reviewers saw that fan favorite Paulina became the central character; Rodrigo Munizaga speculated that Castro, without a continuing contract, was even less enthused to return after she had been "overshadowed" (Note: Spanish: "se había visto opacado") by Suárez in season one. Going into the show's sophomore season, Vogue described Suárez as "the new queen of the telenovela". (Note: Spanish: "la nueva reina del culebrón")

Caro explained that the writing and production of the second season did not change very much, despite Castro's absence, because they "knew from the beginning that there was a possibility she would not return", (Note: Spanish: "desde el principio sabíamos que había una posibilidad de que ella no volviera") saying that they had already outlined the stories for the children independent of this. During production, Caro said that the second season would be more "intense", and that exploring how the family works without the matriarch's presence is an important topic, with Suárez adding that it would be crazier than the first season. The use of music also became a more physical presence in the second season, with Caro explaining: "It was an evolution, in the first season and without realizing it, these playlists were created and really grabbed my attention regardless of what songs they had, they asked me what songs I listened to when I was writing, and it helped us to be creative in the writers' room." (Note: Spanish: "Fue una evolución, en la primera temporada y sin darnos cuenta, se crearon estos playlists y me llamó mucho la atención que independientemente de las canciones que estaban, me preguntaban qué canciones escuchaba en el momento de estarla escribiendo y nos sirvió para crearla en el cuarto de escritores.")

In 2019, some of the production moved to Netflix's new Madrid headquarters, with development split between Spain and Mexico.

=== Casting ===
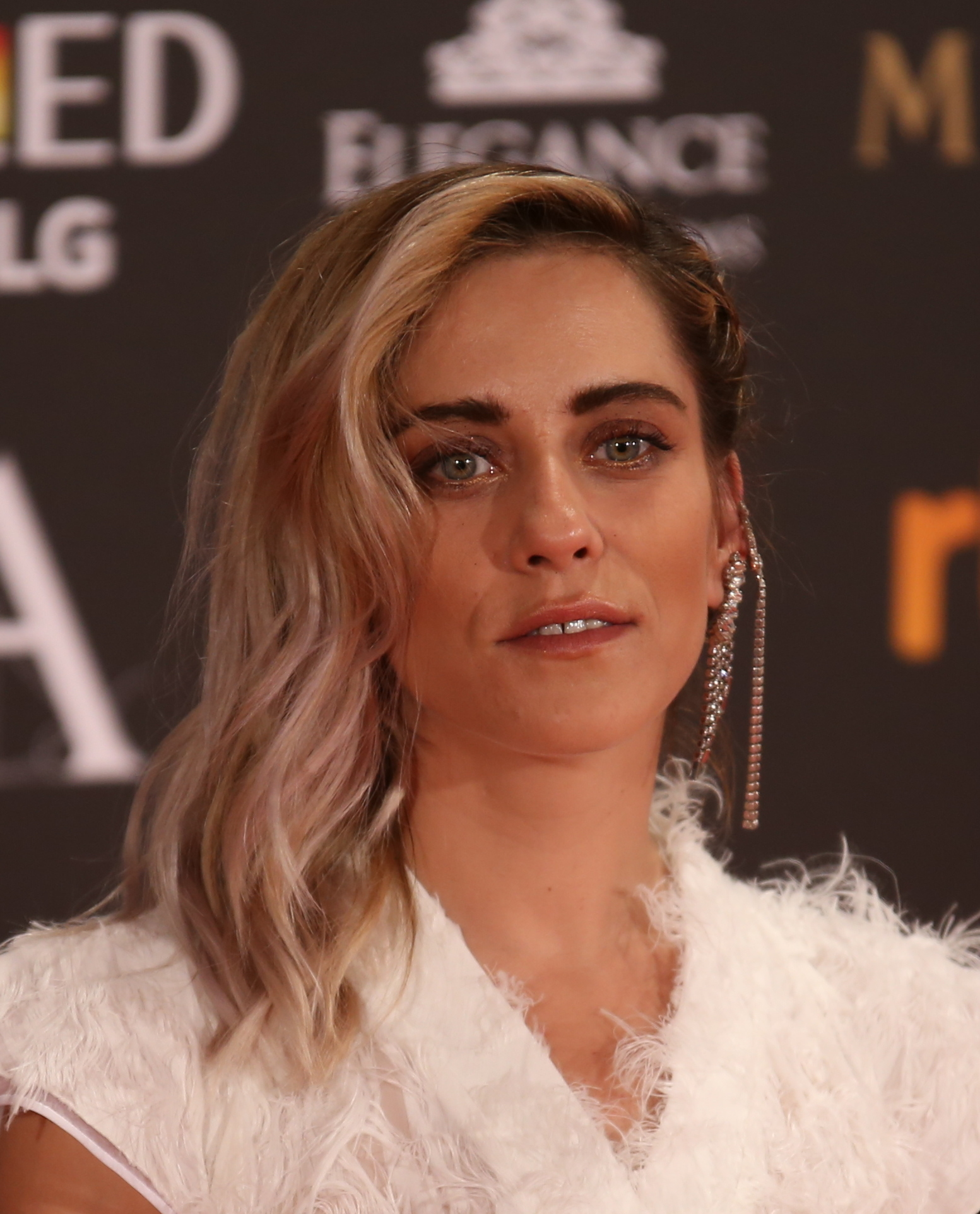
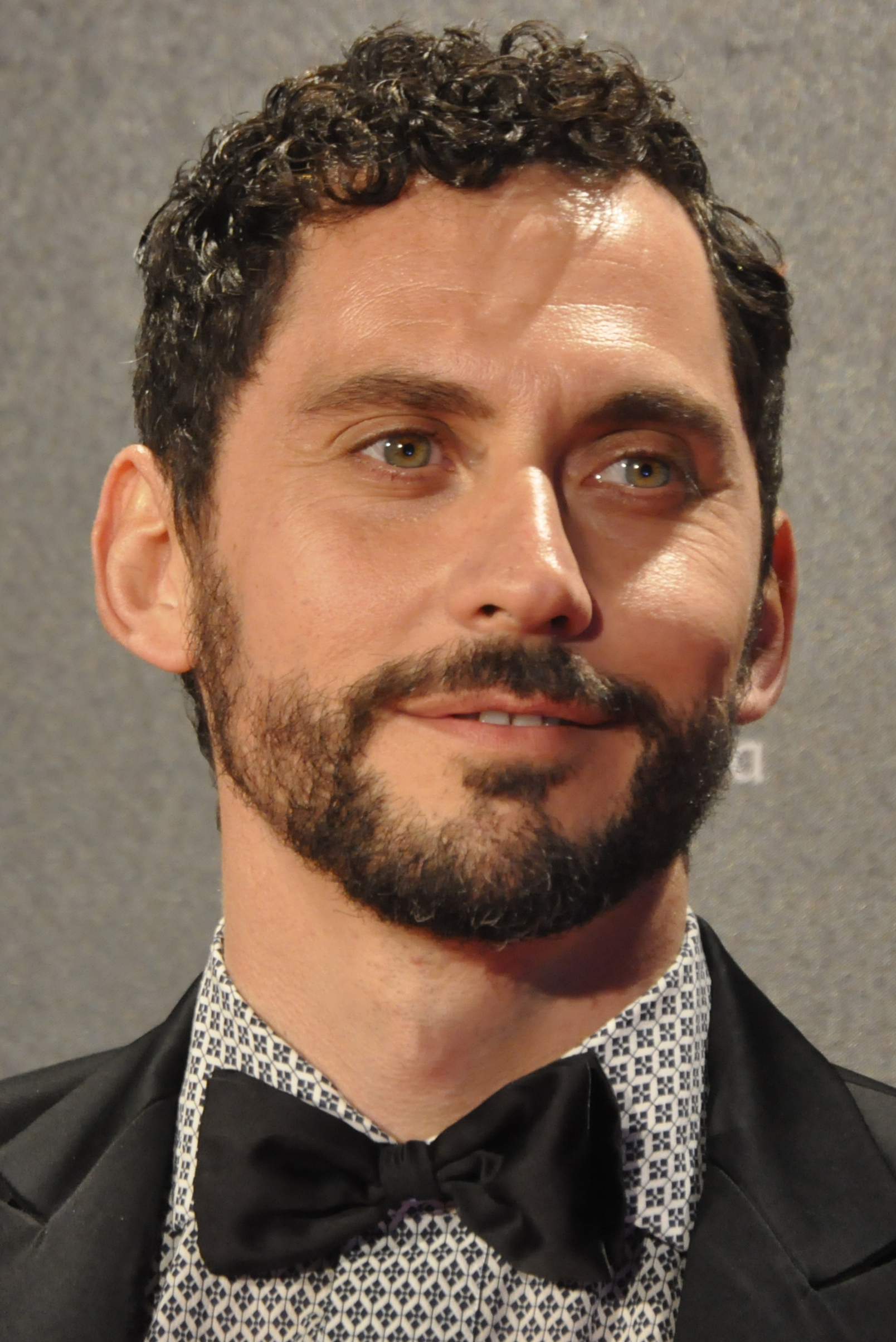
Spanish siblings María and Paco León play the Riquelme sisters on the show.

Paco León's sister María León was added to the cast for season 2, to play Purificación Riquelme, the sister of María José. The casting was praised by Spanish media for using the real sister of María José's actor, suggesting that beyond looking alike, the siblings have very noticeable light-colored eyes and it would not have made sense to cast somebody else when María León is also an accomplished actor.

Casting for season 2 was announced as it began filming, first on February 5 with Spanish cast members María León, Eduardo Rosa as Alejo, and Eduardo Casanova as Edu, and then with Mexican actors on February 18: Loreto Peralta as Rosita, Flavio Medina as Simón, Anabel Ferreira as Celeste, and Mariana Treviño as Jenny Quetzal. Eduardo Rosa said of his casting that he submitted a video audition and was invited to Madrid to meet with Caro before he had read the script, but told Caro that he loved it anyway. David Chaviras also returned as El Cacas in season 2. His character only had a small part and was not intended to return, but became popular among fans because of his charismatic interaction with Paulina; Cacas gained a larger role in the second season, as well as a meeting room named after him in Netflix's Mexico headquarters.

Having worked with Caro and Suárez before, Teresa Ruiz says that the character of Marilú was developed for her to have a role in the show. In a 2019 interview, Ruiz says she asked Caro for something easier when he proposed the escort because she had not done comedy before, but was swayed by Caro's determination. Ruiz also says that a lot of thought was put into the message of the character, and that even though the show is comedic, when she gives speeches about the rights of the young escorts it is intended to be truthful dialogue about all working women.

=== Filming ===
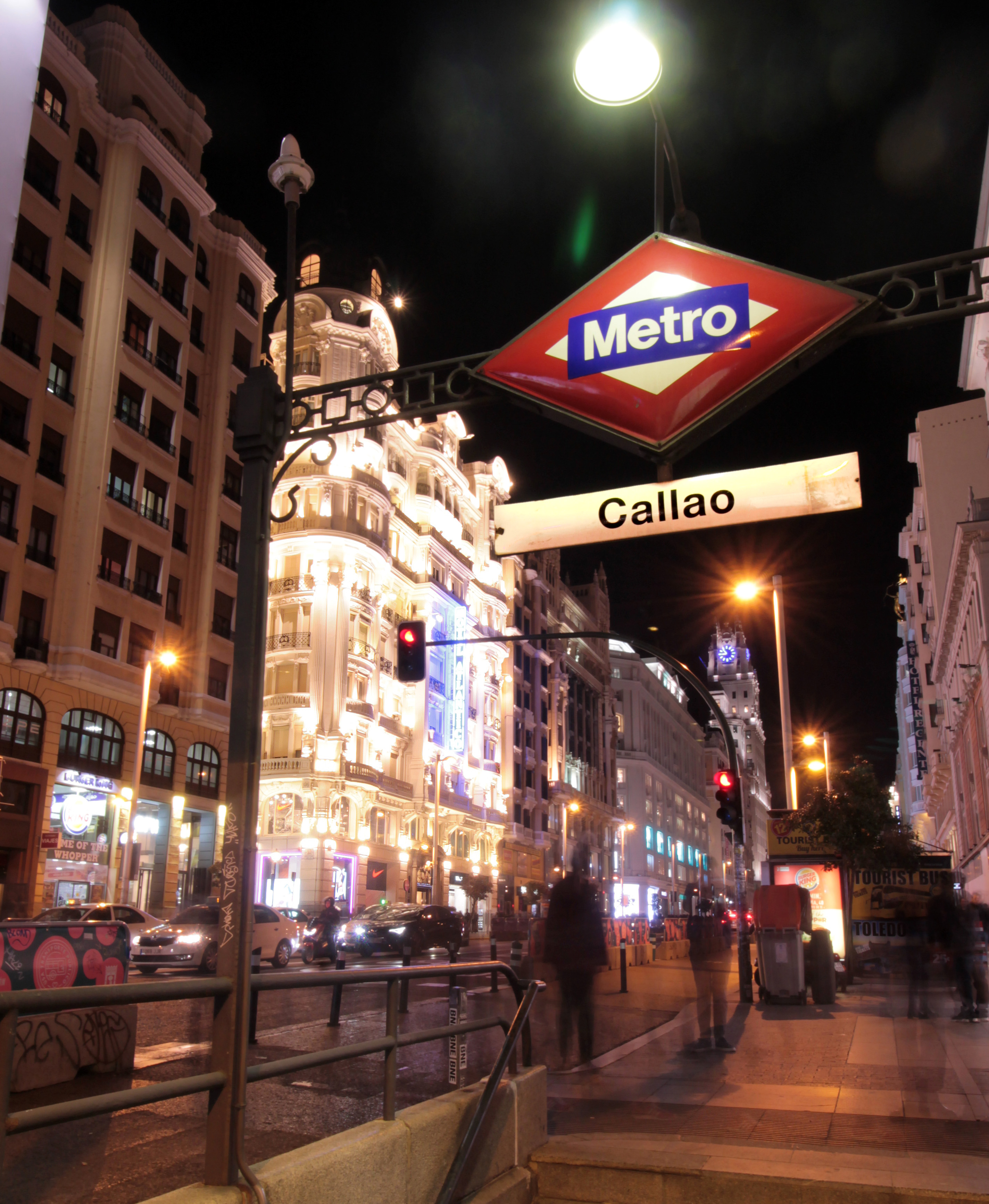
Some scenes were filmed along the Gran Vía and at an entrance to Callao station in Madrid.

Filming began in early February 2019, with production in Spain from February 5, and ended on July 9, 2019. Some of the season was filmed on location in Madrid in February 2019; Carmen Maura visited the set to discuss the upcoming Netflix show, Someone Has To Die, that she was working on with Caro and Suárez. Caro said that during the development of the season, he had wanted to film in Spain, but wasn't sure he could make it happen, saying that he wanted to give back to the public there that supported the series; Caro had promised fans that Paulina would walk down Madrid's Gran Vía in season 2, and revealed to the Spanish press shortly before the season was released that this would definitely be included. Filming in Mexico largely took place in a nineteenth-century house in Condesa, and the second and third seasons were filmed at the same time.

== Release and marketing ==
The second season premiered in its entirety on October 18, 2019. In its first week of broadcast, the second season was watched by over 6.2 million accounts, from across the world; it became the top viewed show on Netflix that week in Argentina, Colombia, Spain, and Mexico, among other countries. It also broke the Netflix record in Mexico as the most-viewed second season of any show in its first week ever.

The first marketing videos were released in August 2019 and used the "characteristic cadence" of Paulina's voice. (Note: Spanish: "característica cadencia") On August 8, a video of Paulina leaving a threatening voicemail for Diego, mimicking the one in Taken, was released. On August 12, it was announced that the character of Virginia had died rather than simply been written out, in a marketing video showing a voice note left in the siblings' WhatsApp chat by Paulina along with the hashtag "#QDEPVirginiaDeLaMora" ("RIP Virginia de la Mora"), and on August 15, 2019, the release date of the season was included in a tweet that also showed the new family portrait. On October 2, another marketing video, also focused on Paulina speaking, was released. In it, Netflix asks the character to make an ASMR video recap, which she attempts. The first official trailer was released on September 23, showing scenes from the first episode in both Madrid and Mexico City, focusing on Paulina trying to regain the florists and find Diego.

A press tour was held for season 2 a few weeks before it was released; Aislinn Derbez did not participate, despite being a main character, because the release date of the season was the same as her family's new reality show on competing streaming platform Amazon Prime Video.

== Episodes ==
| No. overall | No. in season | Title | Directed by | Written by | Original release date |
|---|---|---|---|---|---|
| 14 | 1 | "ROSE (symb unity)" | Manolo Caro | Manolo Caro | October 18, 2019 |
Paulina returns to Mexico from her family in Madrid after hearing of an issue with Virginia's will. She also vows to get revenge on Diego, who reappears to try again with Julián.
| 15 | 2 | "IRIS (symb. faith)" | Manolo Caro | Mara Vargas | October 18, 2019 |
Paulina's plan to fix everything revolves around making the cabaret profitable, and Diego visits her to mysteriously buy it back.
| 16 | 3 | "LOTUS (symb. mystery)" | Manolo Caro & Alberto Belli | Gabriel Nuncio | October 18, 2019 |
Paulina is on a mission to recruit all the old drag queens to the cabaret, Elena takes a job for the Chiquis in redesigning the old florists, and Ernesto rises the ranks in his cult by meeting its leader, Jenny.
| 17 | 4 | "ALMOND (symb. awaken)" | Alberto Belli | Hipatia Argüero Mendoza | October 18, 2019 |
María José and Bruno arrive from Spain. María José and Paulina face conflicts, and Bruno reunites with Micaela, who enters Talento México.
| 18 | 5 | "ACACIA (symb. secret love)" | Santiago Limón | Alexandro Aldrete | October 18, 2019 |
The de la Mora siblings begin looking for Alejo, who they've spotted on several occasions, believing him to hold a clue to their mother's final months, while Ernesto tries to forget the past by dragging Cacas into his cult.
| 19 | 6 | "CLOVES (symb, capricious)" | Yibrán Asuad | Hipatia Argüero Mendoza | October 18, 2019 |
The cult move into the de la Mora family home, while Paulina softens to Alejo and begins to plot against Diego, and Elena gets closer to Simón.
| 20 | 7 | "GERANIUM (symb. counsel)" | Yibrán Asuad | Gabriel Nuncio | October 18, 2019 |
Diego realizes that Lucía's child is not Julián's and confronts her. Paulina lets herself go wild on a night out, getting close to Alejo. Ernesto becomes jealous of Jenny's favor to Cacas.
| 21 | 8 | "HELICONIA (symb. fertility)" | Manolo Caro | Alexandro Aldrete | October 18, 2019 |
As Micaela does well on Talento México, Paulina battles with her feelings about Alejo, and Diego asks Elena to be a surrogate.
| 22 | 9 | "PANSY (symb. reflection)" | Manolo Caro | Manolo Caro | October 18, 2019 |
The family gather for Virginia's will to be read, exposing several truths that are uncomfortable for Paulina. Wanting her family to be happy, Paulina turns herself in to the police to free Diego.

== Critical reception ==
Professional ratings
Review scores
| Source | Rating |
|---|---|
| Cinemagavia | 2/5 stars |
| Espinof | 2.5/5 stars |
| La Tercera | 4/5 stars |
| Locos x el Cine | (Note: Season 1 and season 2 were reviewed together.) |
| Ready Steady Cut | 3.5/5 stars |

The new character Jenny Quetzal was described as "unnecessary" (Note: Spanish: "innecesarios") by Ángel Balán, and Kike Esparza agreed that she "contributed nothing"; (Note: Spanish: "tampoco abonó mucho") however, Balán thought that the final episode was one of the best season finales that he had seen in a long time. Espinof's review said that it was "full of humor, a slight touch of social criticism and, of course, lots of little twists" (Note: Spanish: "llenos de humor, un leve toque de crítica social y, por supuesto, giritos") but, like the first season, it fell flat in some areas. Cinemagavia's Diego Da Costa wrote that the plots lost originality and the scripts lost their humor, adding that the "new characters do not combine well with the universe" of the series. (Note: Spanish: "nuevos personajes no llega a combinar bien con el universo creado previamente") Reviewer Alberto Carlos said that some of the plots are gratuitous, with the cult story-line being like "overstretched chewing gum". (Note: Spanish: "alargada cual chicle") Carlos concluded that Caro may have sacrificed good writing for the sake of eccentricity, with Esparza similarly suggesting that humorous plots were used without having any substance. Gisela Orozco of the Chicago Tribune thought that it seemed like Caro was improvising and coming up with new plots on the spur of the moment, that he was "adding 'water' to his flowers [but they] did not 'bloom' at all". (Note: Spanish: "poniéndole 'agua' de más a sus flores con situaciones y personajes que no 'florecieron' del todo")

Javier Zurro described the season's main vice as being that it seems to have "taken itself seriously", (Note: Spanish: "la serie se hubiera tomado a sí misma en serio") which does not work with the format, and has turned back into the telenovelas that the first season was parodying. He noted that the concepts of the season do not feel fresh, because it has copied all the formulas of the first; he did, however, believe that the first season was surprisingly good and so the second had the challenge "to be bigger, more spectacular". (Note: Spanish: "ser más grande, más espectacular") Munizaga instead suggested that the main issue is that it does not include much of what made the first season so fresh, calling it "meek and decaffeinated" (Note: Spanish: "mansa y descafeinada") in comparison.

Zurro was also critical of the choice to kill off Virginia in the face of Verónica Castro's absence, seeing it as an easy way out. Esparza thought that the season would have been better if it had retained Verónica Castro as Virginia, because the show's dynamic is not the same without Virginia and Paulina playing off each other; Munizaga wrote that the season feels uncentered, and this is likely because without Castro's Virginia there is no reason to focus on the titular shop, making its inclusion forced. However, Marieta Taibo for Cosmopolitan wrote that her departure is handled well and that Suárez and Paulina become the center, and CNET's Patricia Puentes said that "it is hard to miss" (Note: Spanish: "es difícil echar de menos") the character and the actress, both because of Suárez's performance and because Virginia is still referenced throughout the season.

Despite the more negative response, reviewers looked positively on the character of Paulina. Carlos wrote that "the show is saved by the character of Paulina", (Note: Spanish: "lo único que se salva es la nueva frase viral de Paulina") with Esparza opining that except for Paulina, María José and Delia the character performances are more like caricatures of who they were in season one. Zurro concluded, in contrast to his dismal outlook on the season, that "of course, Paulina de la Mora is still there, and she and Cecilia Suárez are still the rulers of the series", (Note: Spanish: "eso sí, ella sigue ahí, Paulina de la Mora y Cecilia Suárez son las dueñas de la serie") expecting the third season to be better. However, Munizaga commented that Paulina's motivations in the season are "absurd" (Note: Spanish: "absurdos") – Zurro had claimed this of the other characters – but does say that the subplots of everyone else are worse, being both unbelievable and uninteresting. Da Costa reflected that "Suárez is the backbone of the cast, and although she gave the best performance of the series, she is missing some of Paulina's spirit"; (Note: Spanish: "Cecilia Suárez es la columna vertebral del elenco, aunque realice la mejor interpretación de la serie, se echa en falta ese espíritu tan singular que envolvía a Paulina") he added that Medina and Paco León had been under-utilized, writing that Medina "is a triumph in the scenes in which he does appear" (Note: Spanish: "triunfa en las escenas que aparece") and that León was "very wasted". (Note: Spanish: "muy desperdiciado")

Commenting on the art and aesthetics of the season, Da Costa wrote that the "sparkle, mamarrachería" ("craziness") and "visual histrionics" were missing compared to the first season. (Note: Spanish: "se ha perdido el brillo, la mamarrachería", "se echa en falta mayor histrionsimo [sic] visual") He also added that the symbolism of the florists was forgotten, only appearing at a narrative level rather than truly expressed, and that the attempts at "Spanishizing" (Note: Spanish: "españolizar") were unsuccessful, rendering the season "more like a tribute to Mecano than a musical-visual composition". (Note: Spanish: "parece más un homenaje a Mecano que una composición musical con lo visual") However, he did compliment the comic timing of the editing.

== Accolades ==
The second season received several nominations at 2020 ceremonies. For the XXIX Spanish Actors Union Awards, both León siblings were nominated, but neither won. For the 2020 Platino Awards, the show received the third-most television acting nominations (three), including two in the new Supporting categories, for Suárez as best actress, Treviño as best supporting actress, and Medina as supporting actor. The only win was for Suárez, repeating her win from the 2019 awards.

== Notes ==
=== Translated quotations ===
Some quotations in this article were originally in languages other than English, and have been user-translated.
