= The House of Flowers season 1 =

2018 Mexican television season

The House of Flowers
- Season 1
- Season 1 release poster
- Starring: Verónica Castro; Cecilia Suárez; Aislinn Derbez; Darío Yazbek Bernal; Arturo Ríos; Paco León; Juan Pablo Medina; Claudette Maillé
- No. of episodes: 13

Release
- Original network: Netflix
- Original release: August 10, 2018

Additional information
- Filming dates: July 24 – November 22, 2017

Season chronology
- Next → Season 2 (release); El Funeral (chronology)

The first season of The House of Flowers was released to Netflix in its entirety on August 10, 2018. Following the lives of the members of the upper class Mexican de la Mora family, it starts with the suicide of the father's mistress at his birthday party. Social pretenses are put up as the situation is handled, and its fallout underscores the rest of the season, with the family seeming to part ways at the end. The season was directed by show creator Manolo Caro, and written by Caro, Mara Vargas, Monika Revilla, and Gabriel Nuncio.

The show was first announced in 2016, and began filming in 2017. Its main stars were Verónica Castro, Cecilia Suárez and Aislinn Derbez. The transgender character María José was played by Spanish actor Paco León, with the casting causing some initial controversy before the season was released; León was later nominated for a Best Actor award for the portrayal. The production of the season was described as efficient, though it had to be briefly shut down in the aftermath of the 2017 Puebla earthquake. The season had generally favorable reviews, winning several awards, including two Best Actress awards: one each for Suárez and Castro. Suárez's acting and her character, Paulina de la Mora, were particularly well-received.

== Synopsis ==
At the birthday party of Ernesto de la Mora, husband and father to the pseudo-perfect de la Mora family, his mistress Roberta Navarro commits suicide by hanging. His adult children go inside to escape the party and find her. Only the eldest daughter, control freak Paulina, and her teenage son Bruno know of the affair and the child, Micaéla Sánchez, who is the product of it.

Ernesto, whose name Roberta used to take out loans, is arrested for fraud now that she's dead; the family's accounts get frozen. De la Mora matriarch Virginia tries to maintain the image of her perfect family after Roberta's suicide by keeping Ernesto's arrest a secret and aiming to free him before the anniversary of their successful florist's, 'La Casa de las Flores' ('The House of Flowers'). However, the youngest child, son Julián, comes out as bisexual and the loyal customers who saw Virginia as the bastion of moral purity stop coming. With no money coming in to pay bail, Virginia realizes they will have to go through legal processes and asks Paulina to call her lawyer ex-husband María José Riquelme, who had been banished from the family for coming out as transgender, to represent them.

Paulina becomes increasingly focused on a cabaret of the same name as the florist's, that she and Ernesto had been running with Roberta and her son Claudio. She struggles to hide it from the rest of her family, who eventually find out. Virginia withdraws from Paulina and asks middle child Elena to organize a local bar mitzvah in Paulina's place. Julián uninvites boyfriend Diego from the bar mitzvah at his mother's request, which creates tension between them. Elena, scared of settling down with her American fiancé Dominique, begins a relationship with Claudio and breaks up with Dominique just after their impromptu wedding.

Paulina discovers that Dr. Cohen, her childhood therapist, is her biological father, and starts visiting him and his sock puppet assistant Chuy again. She also starts to fall for María José again; the rest of the family warm to María José, including Virginia, who has started selling homegrown marijuana to help raise money for Ernesto. Julián proposes introducing strippers to the cabaret. The family has finally raised enough money at the end of the season, but the money and Diego go missing, suggesting that he stole it. However, Ernesto is freed in time for the party, with Virginia revealing she sold the florist's to their rivals, the Chiquis, before mysteriously leaving. Paulina runs to stop María José at the airport.

== Cast ==
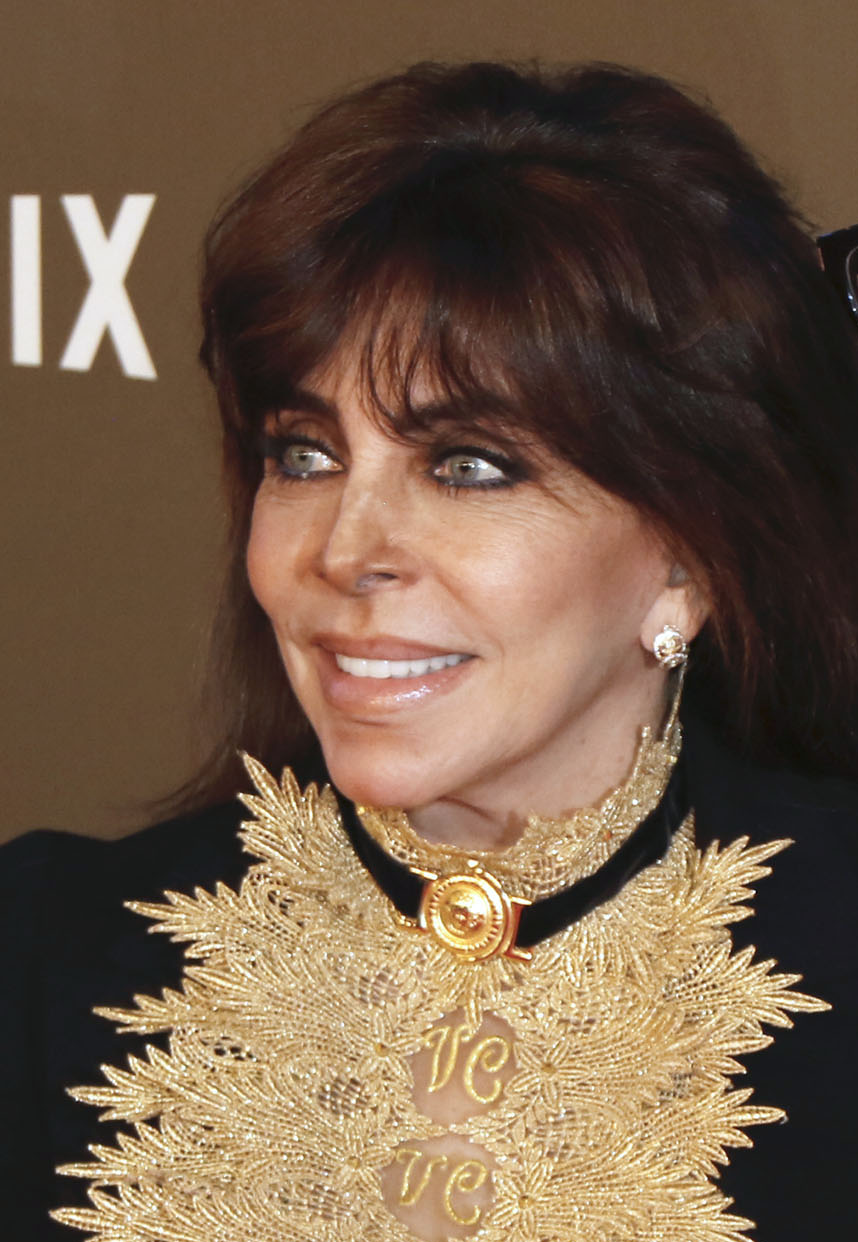
Verónica Castro had her first television role in years in the first season.

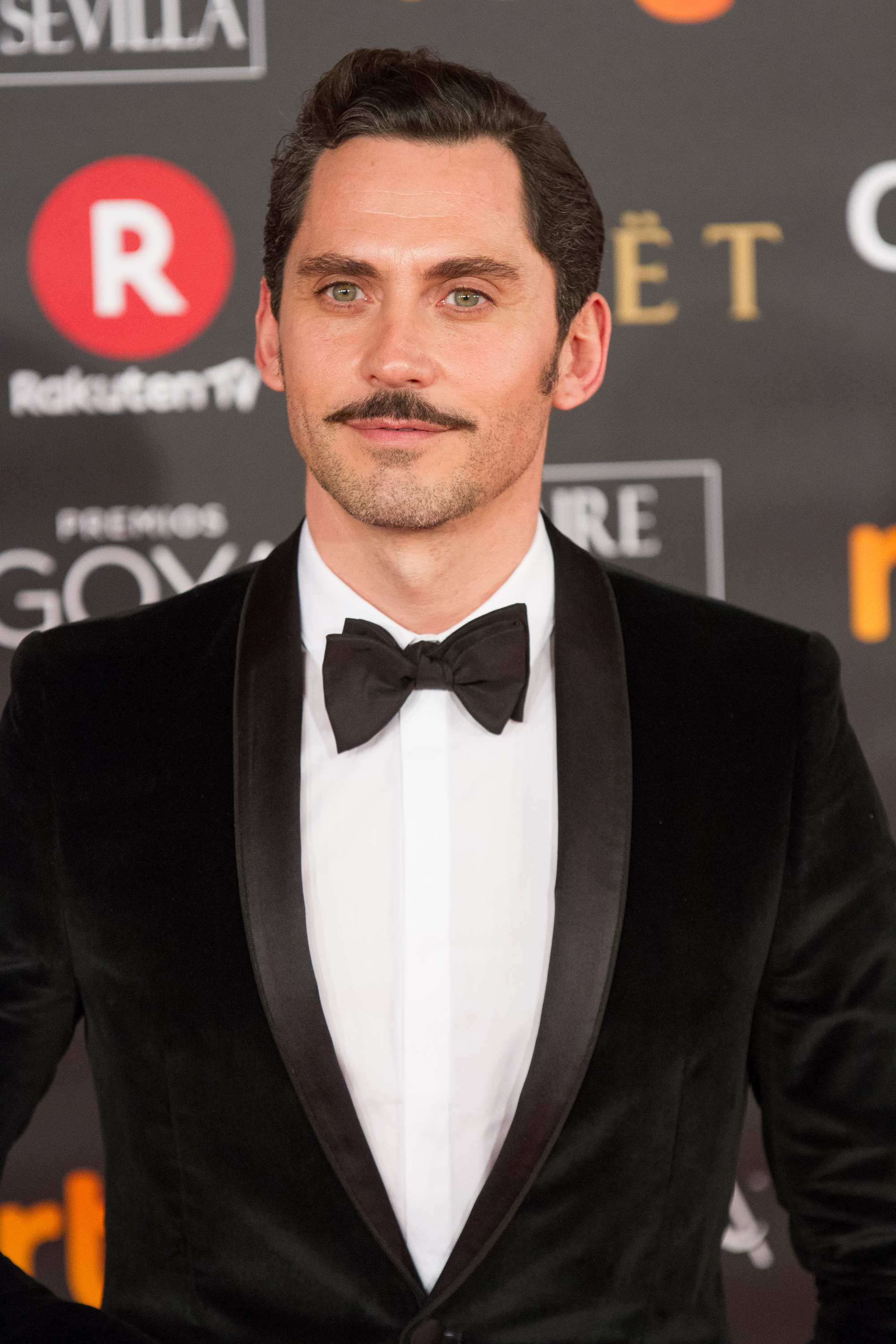
Paco León's casting as a trans woman caused some controversy.

=== Main ===
- Verónica Castro as Virginia de la Mora, the conservative matriarch of the de la Mora family who nevertheless grows weed and accepts her bisexual children
- Cecilia Suárez as Paulina de la Mora, the neurotic eldest child who is constantly handling her family's problems and knows everyone's secrets
- Aislinn Derbez as Elena de la Mora, the ambitious middle child who returns from New York with her black American fiancé Dominique at the start of the season, causing upset in the family until she gets more involved in the family business again
- Darío Yazbek Bernal as Julián de la Mora, the youngest child who is coming to terms with his sexuality
- Paco León as María José Riquelme, Paulina's ex and the family's lawyer, a Spanish trans woman who cares a lot about her family
- Juan Pablo Medina as Diego Olvera, the family's accountant and Julián's boyfriend, a consummate professional and openly gay
- Luis de la Rosa as Bruno Riquelme de la Mora, Paulina and María José's troublemaker teenage son who drinks too much and disrespects his parents but tries to be a role model for Micaéla
- Arturo Ríos as Ernesto de la Mora, father and husband of the de la Moras, a soft man who ends up in jail due to his mistress Roberta committing fraud in his name
- Claudette Maillé as Roberta Navarro, Ernesto's mistress and a former employee at The House of Flowers, she hangs herself in the first episode but appears throughout as an omniscient taunting presence, both narrating the show and appearing to Virginia physically
- Verónica Langer as Carmela "Carmelita" Villalobos, a nosy neighbor of the family who is still kind and friendly beneath it
- Lucas Velázquez as Claudio Navarro, the son of Roberta, a calm man who starts dating Elena but prioritizes his half-sister, Micaéla
- Norma Angélica as Delia, the family's maid and a gossip, she adores Elena and is her confidante
- David Ostrosky as Dr. Salomón Cohen, the family psychiatrist and Virginia's former lover, he works with a sock puppet called Chuy
- Alexa de Landa as Micaéla Sánchez, the young daughter of Ernesto and Roberta who is taken in by Virginia, learning how to tend flowers
- Sheryl Rubio as Lucía Dávila, a social climber and Julián's girlfriend
- Sawandi Wilson as Dominique Shaw, Elena's black American fiancé who is a kind and patient man, friendly with the family despite Virginia's disapproval and casual racism, even learning Spanish

=== Recurring ===
- Natasha Dupeyrón as Ana Paula "La Chiquis" Corcuera, a young blind florist who wants to buy La Casa de las Flores
- Paco Rueda as Agustín "El Chiquis" Corcuera Jr., the smarmy brother of La Chiquis, who assists her
- Ismael Rodríguez as Jorge, the drag queen impersonator of Amanda Miguel
- Pepe Marquez as Pepe/La Pau, the Paulina Rubio drag queen
- Katia Balmori as Mario, the Yuri drag queen
- Mariana Santos as Gloria, the Gloria Trevi drag queen
- Irving Peña as Alfonso "Poncho" Cruz, a stripper who falls in love with Carmelita
- Michel Frías as Moisés Cohen, Bruno's friend and Salomón's nephew
- Hugo Catalán as Oliver, a gay friend of Diego and Julián
- Ruth Ovseyevitz as Dora Cohen, Moi's mother and Salomón's sister, a friend to the de la Mora family
- David Chaviras as El Cacas, the cellmate of Ernesto who befriends Paulina
- Alexis Ortega as Dr. Federico "DJ Freddy" Limantour, a drug dealer, DJ, and doctor who helps revitalize business at the florist's
- Elizabeth Guindi as Angélica, one of Virginia's conservative friends
- Andrea Sisniega as La Beba, one of Virginia's conservative friends
- Amanda Farah as the funeral home worker
- Federico Espejo as Willy, a gay man that Diego and Julián try to have an open relationship with
- Sofía Sisniega as Mara, a wedding planner that Julián has an affair with
- Roberto Quijano as Luka, a news reporter and photographer for Mexican Vanity Fair
- Felipe Flores as Lalo, a male stripper at the cabaret
- Francisco de la Reguera as Juanpi, a young and nerdy drug lord

== Production ==
=== Development and casting ===
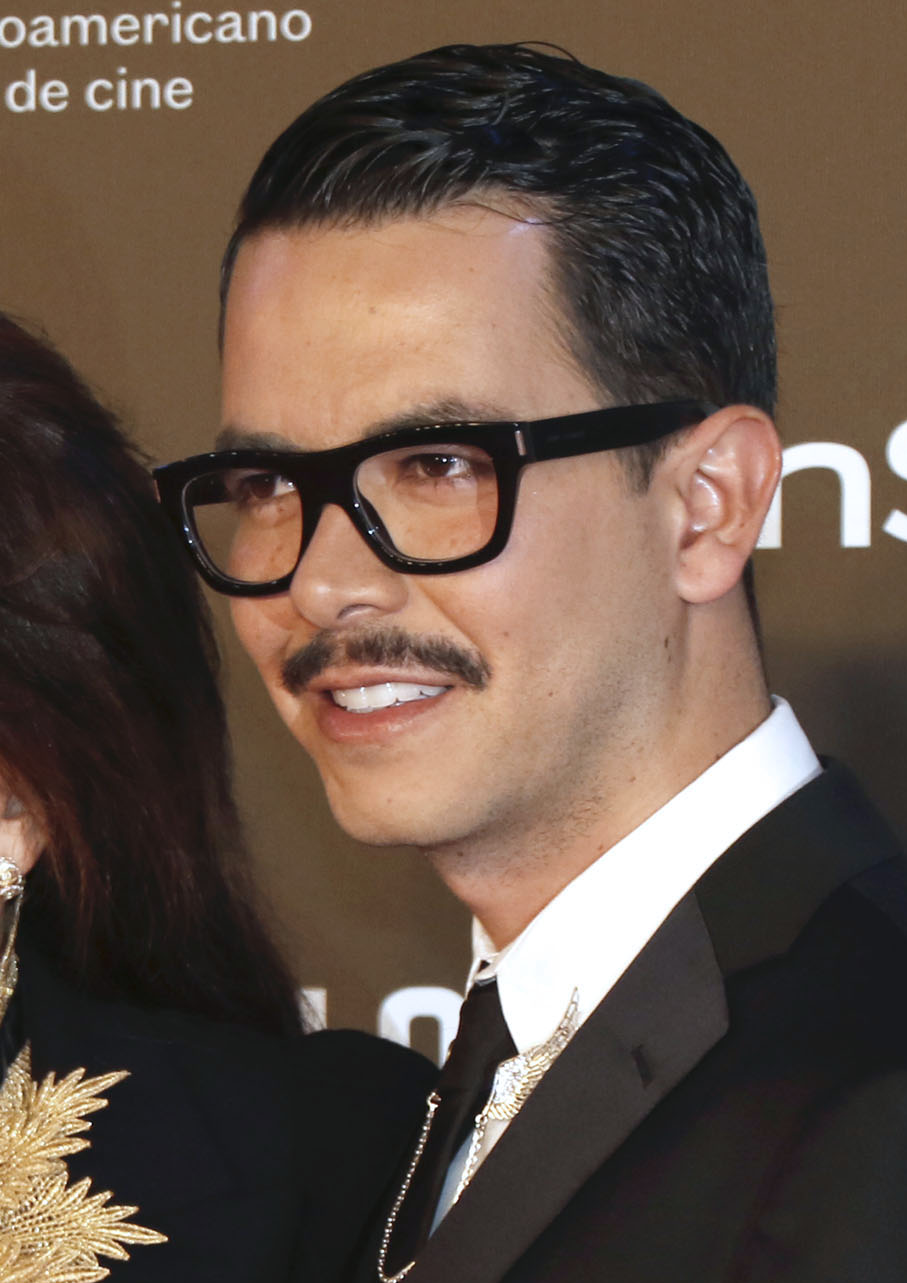
The series was creator Manolo Caro's first work in television.

A new Netflix original series to be created by Manolo Caro was announced in October 2016, with the title and the principal cast being revealed in January 2017. This principal cast was made up of Castro, Suárez, and Derbez. Suárez had acted in most of Caro's other works before the show, though a reviewer suggested that she had to "leave her comfort zone" (Note: Spanish: "deja [...] su zona de confort") to play Paulina, doing so successfully, while León says that he was offered the role of María José after a brief conversation with Caro, and was immediately enthusiastic. The casting of Verónica Castro, referred to as "Mexican telenovela royalty", was seen by Remezcla's media reviewer Manuel Betancourt to be a real achievement on the part of Caro, who in effect was "getting her out of retirement" to make the show. Castro has said that she did not know her character would be a marijuana smoker when she took the role, and though she disliked some parts of the character, she was encouraged by her children to continue with the show. She has also said that getting back into acting with the show helped her mental health.

There was initially some controversy around the casting of Paco León, a cisgender actor, as a trans woman. León said that the show's intention with his character was to "take this character out of the stereotypical perception, in a sense that would create a healthy dialogue about LGBTQ issues by providing a positive portrayal of a trans woman", adding that it was important to the production and that they hope the character of María José achieved their intentions. He has also said he is not sure why the production did not cast a trans actress, but wanted to honor the role and felt his job as an actor is to be able to interpret any role, without stepping on the toes of trans actresses for whom he thought it would be an opportunity to be heard. When the controversy arose, León said he understood it and didn't want to push back, though he was given a supportive message from trans actress Daniela Vega during this period. Caro has said that he first thought of León for the role because of the actor-director's own work to create more visibility and opportunities for LGBT+ people in entertainment. After the show aired, it was reported that trans people had warmed to the character, and particularly her line: "I had a change of sex, not of heart". (Note: Spanish: "Me cambié de sexo, no de corazón") Though León's portrayal was accepted, the actor said that he will not accept more trans roles so as to promote more trans actors, but would continue as María José in the show.

Regarding having a transgender character in general, creator Caro said that he is "committed to the issue because it is time to normalize it", (Note: Spanish: "Estoy comprometido con el tema porque es momento de normalizarlo. Me parece muy importante desmitificar las figuras que tenemos asociadas a los personajes de identidades de género diferentes".) and that he thinks media needs to "demystify" real people from LGBT+ stereotypes. In terms of his approach to playing María José, León also affirmed that he "left the comedy behind" (Note: Spanish: "renuncié aquí a la comicidad") from when he had played female characters before in impersonation show Homo Zapping, treating the role seriously.

=== Filming and release ===
Principal photography began on July 24, 2017 in Mexico City, with the main sets in San Andrés Totoltepec. According to Derbez, who was pregnant during filming, accommodations were made specifically to hide her baby bump in the show. She also said that it was one of the fastest shoots she had done, explaining that Caro is a calm and efficient director.

Filming was halted for several weeks in September and October 2017 after the 2017 Puebla earthquake as the filming location needed to be stabilized before production could continue. Suárez was also injured in the earthquake and could not return to set for a month after production resumed. The show was filming in Condesa as the quake happened, with the cast commending Caro for helping rescue extras and being the last to evacuate the site.

Suárez has said that her character's distinctive voice came through a process of improvisation while filming, starting on the fourth shoot day during the scene where Paulina and Bruno are covering up Roberta's wake at the funeral home, by trying out variations and being pushed by Caro to keep exaggerating it further after he approved of it. She explained that some of the early scenes had to be re-recorded to keep Paulina's speech consistent. Another scene also had to be re-shot; when the characters of Julián and Diego kiss in a sports store, it was first to be recorded in a Martí outlet. When the owners learned that the scene involved a gay kiss they shut down filming, because they did not want the brand to be associated with this, and the scene was later shot at Innovasport.

Caro has discussed the impromptu planning for some scenes. He said that during filming of the mariachi scene, he asked cinematographer Pedro Gómez Millán if they could get the shot to move away into the air. Gómez Millán advised Caro that they could not use a crane, the traditional route for such a shot, because they were filming in a real indoor location; he instead suggested the use of a drone. This produced so much wind that costumes and props had to be pinned down. Caro also explained that he, Darío Yazbek Bernal, and the art department had planned Julián's fantasy coming-out musical sequence, keeping it a secret from the rest of the cast until filming. They also only managed one take, as when Yazbek Bernal ripped off his shirt during the dance, he tore it. This scene then led the way for more musical numbers on the show.

Filming concluded on November 22, 2017. The full 13-episode first season was released on Netflix on August 10, 2018. Before the first season was released, a trailer debuted on June 12, 2018. By November 2018, it was one of the most-watched current series around the world, marking it as a part of the Mexican boom of new media and a Netflix success. The season's release coincided with the northern hemisphere's summer season; some reviews have described the show as perfect for the summer, though Katherine Plumhoff for Ozy wrote that it was ideal to binge-watch with family over the northern winter holiday season.

== Episodes ==
No. overall	No. in season	Title	Directed by	Written by	Original release date
1	1	"NARCISSUS (symb. lies)"	Manolo Caro	Manolo Caro	August 10, 2018
Virginia de la Mora throws a big party to celebrate her husband Ernesto's birthday. Their daughter Elena returns home from New York with her African-American boyfriend Dominique; their son Julián is cheating on his girlfriend Lucía with the family's financial advisor, Diego; and Ernesto's longtime mistress Roberta hangs herself in the family's shop, The House of Flowers.
2	2	"CHRYSANTHEMUM (symb. pain)"	Manolo Caro	Gabriel Nuncio	August 10, 2018
Virginia tries to cope with the revelation of Ernesto's affair and illegitimate daughter Micaela, and feels betrayed by own her daughter Paulina, who has known her father's secrets for years. Paulina struggles to hide Roberta's funeral—as well as the existence of Ernesto's side business, a drag cabaret also called The House of Flowers—from her mother and siblings. Virginia reads the letter Roberta left for her.
3	3	"LILY (symb. freedom)"	Manolo Caro	Monika Revilla	August 10, 2018
Julián wants to come out as gay to his parents so he can finally move in with Diego. Elena warns Virginia, who just wants to convince Julián to marry Lucía. Julián tries to break up with Lucía, but she refuses to accept that he is gay, and they have sex. Julián comes out as bisexual and reveals his five-year relationship with Diego; Virginia is distraught, but Ernesto is accepting. Ernesto is arrested for financial crimes.
4	4	"PETUNIA (symb. resentment)"	Manolo Caro	Mara Vargas	August 10, 2018
Elena learns from Delia that she or one of her siblings was not fathered by Ernesto. Roberta took out 23 million pesos in loans in Ernesto's name, and Virginia, who learned about it from Roberta's letter, sees his arrest as retribution for his infidelity. Paulina is forced to call her lawyer ex-husband, José María, to help her father. Virginia has a change of heart, but the family's assets are frozen. She enlists a friend's son to sell her homegrown marijuana.
5	5	"DAHLIA (symb. gratitude)"	Manolo Caro	Gabriel Nuncio	August 10, 2018
To spite Paulina, Virginia puts Elena in charge of the flowers for a big bar mitzvah, and Paulina sabotages her sister at every turn. Claudio helps Elena with the event, and they have sex. Virginia convinces Julián to invite Lucía to the bar mitzvah instead of Diego. Paulina finds out that Virginia dated Dr. Cohen right before she met and married Ernesto. The DNA results come in, and Paulina learns that she is not Ernesto's daughter.
6	6	"MAGNOLIA (symb. dignity)"	Manolo Caro	Monika Revilla	August 10, 2018
Paulina's transgender ex-husband—now named María José–arrives in Mexico City to help Ernesto. Claudio and Julián introduce male strippers to the cabaret, but conflict arises between them and the drag queens. Virginia is secretly selling her marijuana out of the flower shop. Diego is angry with Julián, and brings home another man in retaliation for Lucía. Elena learns what Virginia is up to, and offers to help. The de la Mora finances are unfrozen, but Ernesto remains in jail as a flight risk.
7	7	"PEONY (symb. shame)"	Manolo Caro	Manolo Caro	August 10, 2018
Lucía blackmails Julián with the sex tape he made with Diego and Willy. Paulina visits Dr. Cohen to find out if he is her father, while Julián goes to Ernesto in jail for advice. Claudio helps Elena acquire more marijuana plants. Julián is forced to propose to Lucía while Virginia goes to Diego to convince him to take Julián back. Julián takes back the ring and proposes to Diego instead, so Lucía posts the sex video online.
8	8	"BROMELIA (symb. resilience)"	Manolo Caro	Mara Vargas	August 10, 2018
Julián's video has gone viral, and he is humiliated to learn that he is now popularly known as "Lord Give It To Me". Virginia's attempt at revenge against Lucía fails, but she later confronts Lucía, chops off some of her hair, and tells her friends that Lucía's family made their money from strip clubs and drugs. Elena cannot resist Claudio, and they have sex again. After Ernesto calls to give Virginia his support, she vows to get him out of prison.
9	9	"TULIP (symb. hope)"	Manolo Caro	Gabriel Nuncio	August 10, 2018
La Chiquis makes an offer to buy The House of Flowers. Elena sends Poncho to seduce the de la Moras' nosy neighbor Carmela. Julián tries to drum up more business for the shop. Virginia confirms that Dr. Cohen is Paulina's father.
10	10	"TUSSILAGO (symb. worries)"	Manolo Caro	Monika Revilla, Mara Vargas, Gabriel Nuncio	August 10, 2018
Virginia is visited by a local drug dealer who demands she pay him for selling marijuana in his territory. She is dismissive until Ernesto is beat up in jail over it. When Bruno and Micaela go missing, the family thinks they have been kidnapped. Virginia makes the payment and the children are found, having run away to look at stars.
11	11	"ORCHID (symb. Lust)"	Manolo Caro	Monika Revilla	August 10, 2018
After learning of Elena's affair with Claudio, Virginia arranges for Dominique to visit Elena in Mexico. Virginia is excited to learn that Elena and Dominique want to get married right away. Julián has sex with Mara, and Diego becomes suspicious when he finds a hotel room key. Virginia and Dr. Cohen begin an affair. Elena marries Dominique, but immediately breaks it off to be with Claudio.
12	12	"SISYMBRIUM (symb. adversity)"	Manolo Caro	Mara Vargas	August 10, 2018
Dr. Cohen lends Paulina the rest of the money she needs to secure Ernesto's release from jail, but someone robs the safe. Elena discovers that Claudio does not want to be in an exclusive relationship. Diego leaves Julián, and the family assumes he stole the money. Paulina tells Ernesto she knows he is not her father, but he assures her she is still his favorite daughter.
13	13	"POPPY (symb. resurrection)"	Manolo Caro	Manolo Caro	August 10, 2018
Virginia visits Ernesto in jail, and confesses that she purposely did not help him avoid arrest. María José plans to take Bruno to live with her in Madrid. Diego tells off a devastated Julián. Virginia gets the money to free Ernesto as the family celebrates the 50-year anniversary of the flower shop. Virginia announces that she has sold The House of Flowers to La Chiquis, but Delia learns that Ana Paula wants to tear it down. Carmela's husband returns, finds her in bed with Poncho, and fires a gun at the couple. Before leaving town for good, Virginia encourages Paulina to get María José and Bruno back.

== Critical reception ==
Professional ratings
Aggregate scores
Source	Rating
Rotten Tomatoes	83%
Review scores
Source	Rating
The Daily Dot	3/5 stars
Common Sense Media	3/5 stars
The Review Geek	6/10
Cinemagavia	4.5/5 stars
Espinof	2/5 stars
Ready Steady Cut	3.5/5 stars
Locos x el Cine	(Note: Season 1 and season 2 were reviewed together.)

Reviewing the first season's style, Refinery29's Ariana Romero highlights the fantasy song coming-out moment set to "¿A quién le importa?" where "Julián writhes around on the dinner table, kicking his feet and eventually tearing his shirt off" as a moment that "[e]very single person deserves to see", saying that this charm makes it accessible to viewers who enjoyed American telenovela-style shows like Jane the Virgin. Wheeler also complemented the style, though gave a mixed review. He suggested that the show does not live up to its comedic aspirations, but plays out the drama well, and that while the acting can be overly melodramatic, the use of color and artistic design enhance the show in a "perfect example" of such visual potential. He thought that the show may not become particularly memorable, but is overall entertaining.

Pavel Gaona, for Vice, however, saw the colorful and musical selections as "stumbles"; (Note: Spanish: "tropiezos") in the rest of his review, Gaona wrote that everything from Caro's style and form, to the plotlines, to the casting and performance of actors were all "lacking" and "pretentious", (Note: Spanish: "intentos malogrados", "pretencioso") with the exception of Cecilia Suárez and her character Paulina, whom he gave high praise. Though the character of Paulina has been particularly praised, (Note: From multiple international sources, including: Into, Instinct, Vice, Decider, PopSugar, and India Today.) some critics have mixed views on her idiosyncratic speech. Vinícius Nader of Correio Braziliense found that her speech is "very forced and [has an] artificial rhythm", (Note: Portuguese: "com um ritmo de fala muito forçado e artificial") while Betancourt called it "deliciously languid" and a positive starring feature of her character.

Plumhoff wrote that Suárez "shines" as Paulina and commended her voice for "[making] her one-liners […] feel like TED talks." Plumhoff opined that the characters were the best part of the show, though felt it was let down by discarding the interracial relationship; Esther Vargas criticized some characters in her review, noting that Aislinn Derbez's performance was particularly forgettable, but praised the performance of Luis de la Rosa as Bruno, saying that "in his discreet performance, the silences and looks of this talented young actor open several readings", (Note: Spanish: "en su discreta actuación, los silencios y miradas de este talentoso joven actor abre varias lecturas") noting that Bruno is not affected by his queer parents, a commentary on how "this hyperconnected generation knows no closets". (Note: Spanish: "esta generación hiperconectada no conoce armarios")

== Accolades ==
The first season received several nominations and three awards. At the 2019 Platino Awards, Cecilia Suárez won the Best Actress award in the television category, while the show was nominated in the Best Miniseries or Television Series category. At the 2019 (XXVIII) Spanish Actors Union Awards, Paco León was nominated in the Best Actor in an International Production category for The House of Flowers. For the 2018/19 PRODU Awards, the show was nominated in five categories, winning two, with Verónica Castro as Best Actress and Caro as Best Director.

Year	Award	Category	Nominee(s)	Result	Ref.
2019	Spanish Actors Union Awards	Best Actor in an International Production	Paco León	Nominated	
2019	Platino Awards	Best Ibero-American Miniseries or TV series	The House of Flowers	Nominated	
2019	Platino Awards	Best Actress in a Miniseries or TV series	Cecilia Suárez	Won	
2019	South by Southwest	Excellence in Title Design	Maribel Martinez Galindo	Nominated	
2019	PRODU Awards	Best Actress in a Series, Long Series, or Telenovela	Verónica Castro	Won	
2019	PRODU Awards	Best Director of a Series, Long Series, or Telenovela	Manolo Caro	Won	
2019	PRODU Awards	Best Showrunner of a Series, Long Series, or Telenovela	Manolo Caro	Nominated	
2019	PRODU Awards	Best Writing for a Series, Long Series, or Telenovela	Monika Revilla, Mara Vargas, Gabriel Nuncio and Manolo Caro	Nominated	
2019	PRODU Awards	Best Cinematography in a Series, Long Series, or Telenovela	Pedro Gómez Millán	Nominated	

== Notes ==
=== Translated quotations ===
Some quotations in this article were originally in languages other than English, and have been user-translated.
