= The House of Flowers Presents: The Funeral =

2019 film

- Spanish: La Casa de las Flores: El funeral
- Directed by: Manolo Caro
- Written by: Mara Vargas
- Starring: Cecilia Suárez; Aislinn Derbez; Darío Yazbek Bernal; Juan Pablo Medina; Paco León
- Narrated by: Claudette Maillé
- Music by: Yamil Rezc
- Production company: Netflix
- Release date: November 1, 2019
- Running time: 35 minutes
- Country: Mexico
- Language: Spanish

The House of Flowers Presents: The Funeral (Spanish: La Casa de las Flores: El funeral) is a 2019 special of the Mexican dark comedy telenovela The House of Flowers. It was released on November 1, 2019, without any forewarning, as a separate short film on the Netflix streaming platform where the television series airs. It was written by Mara Vargas and directed by series creator Manolo Caro.

It stars members of the show's cast as the de la Mora family, mourning matriarch Virginia, who died between seasons one and two; though released only a few weeks after season two, it fits chronologically between the first two seasons. (Note: Season one ended with Virginia de la Mora mysteriously packing up and abandoning her family. Season two begins with the family being split apart, having just received Virginia's belongings and in anticipation of her will being fulfilled.)

== Background ==
In August 2018, shortly after the release of the first season, Verónica Castro announced that she would not be returning as matriarch Virginia de la Mora on The House of Flowers, which was confirmed by Manolo Caro a few days later. At this point, Netflix had not renewed the show for a second season, but Caro also said that following stories would be focused on the de la Mora children. Promotion for season 2 then revealed that the character had died, with shots of the funeral included in the trailer. Within the episodes of the second season, the funeral is only referenced as having happened, but no details beyond Paulina doing something dramatic are revealed.

== Cast ==
- Cecilia Suárez as Paulina de la Mora
- Aislinn Derbez as Elena de la Mora
- Darío Yazbek Bernal as Julián de la Mora
- Juan Pablo Medina as Diego Olvera
- Paco León as María José Riquelme

There was also an extensive guest cast of other characters.

== Plot ==
The de la Mora family matriarch, Virginia, has mysteriously died in Houston, having not been in contact with her family. Now, beleaguered husband Ernesto (Arturo Ríos) must transport her coffin back to Mexico City, while their children assemble at the family florists for the wake. The eldest, Paulina, awaits the arrival of her transgender partner María José and their son Bruno (Luis de La Rosa) to make her less anxious; Bruno is also nervous, though, as he and María José left for Spain without the chance to say goodbye to his grandmother.

With Ernesto taking longer than expected, youngest child, Julián organizes for a coffin to arrive on loan; when it does, the guests think that Virginia is in it. He is sent around to greet all the guests as his siblings try to fix the issue by disallowing people from touching it; having been a "mama's boy", he suffers a bit of an identity crisis now that his mother has died. The middle child, Elena, is also waiting for her new boyfriend, a biker, and has dressed in dark make-up and a leather jacket to match him; a string of her past boyfriends arrive before him, and she tries to keep them all happy without disturbing the more stuck-up guests.

All seems to be falling apart as Ernesto is stopped at the Texas-Mexico border for not having certified translations of his wife's documents; Paulina is triggered by meeting her old school friends and starts snapping at the homophobic and transphobic acquaintances who are at the wake. Julián meets an old friend, Oliver, who has come to give him support and a business proposition as a male escort. Bruno has become progressively more drunk throughout the wake, unable to deal with his guilt and his unofficial babysitting role for Micaéla (Alexa de Landa), but his parents are too distracted to notice.

Ernesto's friend comes up with a plan to smuggle Virginia's body back to Mexico, by disguising her as sleeping and moving the coffin to the trunk. Uncomfortable but desperate, Ernesto agrees. They are then loaned the use of distinguished friend Carlos's private jet to fly to the capital. Ernesto arrives, revealing Virginia's coffin to be bright pink and fluffy – the family distracts the guests in the courtyard as they also swap the coffins. He also notes that the hospital in Houston is having her things sent to them by courier, which could take a while.

During the tributes, Paulina has a breakdown, seemingly about her mother's fake friends and their reactions to her relationship. María José calms Paulina by sending her to a back room to hide away from the guests, where she encounters her siblings who are also hiding. After having a heart-to-heart, they realize they are sitting on the bright pink coffin and leave to socialize. Outside, Julián's ex and family accountant Diego has returned from hiding to give his sympathies; Oliver stops him and claims that Julián is too angry to see him, despite the opposite being true. Julián is then approached by his ex-girlfriend Lucía (Sheryl Rubio), who tries to come on to him. Elena's new boyfriend finally shows up, but shrugs her off, and Ernesto gets the chance to thank Carlos for the jet. Carlos, who was not known for his generosity, says that his mind has been opened up by an elite sect called the Flock, inviting Ernesto to join.

== Release and marketing ==
The special was released on Día de muertos (November 1) 2019, the Mexican celebration of dead relatives. References to Virginia's funeral through season two had been popular among viewers before it was released; it also connects other plot points from the second season. It was released in a special priority slot to the site, meaning that during its 'premiere' it was one of the first media that users would be shown and occupied the header.

The only marketing for the surprise funeral episode came shortly after its release to the platform, in a tweet from Manolo Caro. Netflix released a poetic press release about the episode after this.

Remezcla's Manuel Betancourt noted that fans of the show were expecting to see the funeral during season 2, and were left wanting to know what happened after binge-watching the second season. He believes that the writing of season 2, making fans curious when the character Paulina says that she can't remember what happened at the funeral, was designed for the Netflix platform, both because it helps create word-of-mouth promotion and because the answer can be released at any time. He says that the episode "is proof that creator Manolo Caro is as cheeky as the show itself".

== Response ==
Vanesa Soto for Vanidad calls it "one of the best episodes of the series by far". She notes that as well as wrapping up season 2, it leaves some clues about season 3. Ángel Balán writes in his review for La Verdad that the funeral special is "what nobody expected but what we needed", also saying that Paulina making a scene was "tremendous". He suggests that what he called Caro's "overconfidence" in the face of mixed criticism for season 2 was present because the series creator had the funeral special as "an ace up his sleeve". Milenio says that the special is "a fundamental piece of the second season", and Álvaro Cueva writing for Milenio also adds that "It is a historic event even for a platform as successful as Netflix."

Balán suggested that the special would have fitted better in its chronological place, arguing that the second season could have been received better with the funeral as its opening episode; he explains that it would have book-ended season 2 well, as the season finale was a good closing episode and one of the best finales that he had seen in a long time, and would have introduced viewers more subtly to how the family dynamics had changed between seasons 1 and 2.

== Sources ==
- Puentes, Patricia (2019b). "La casa de las flores 2: Todo lo que necesitas saber de su nueva temporada" [La casa de las flores 2: All you need to know about the new season]. CNET en Español (in Spanish).
- Rosco Martín, Rafael (November 1, 2019). "Netflix estrena sin previo aviso un capítulo sorpresa de La Casa de Las Flores" [Netflix premieres without prior warning a surprise episode of La Casa de Las Flores]. Elle (in Spanish).
- Netflix Latinoamérica (November 1, 2019). La Casa de las Flores | Episodio Sorpresa | El Funeral [La Casa de las Flores | Surprise Episode | The Funeral] (in Spanish) – via YouTube.
- Caro, Manolo (August 10, 2018a). "NARCISSUS (symb. lies)". The House of Flowers. Season 1. Netflix.
- Caro, Manolo (August 10, 2018b). "POPPY (symb. Resurrection)". The House of Flowers. Season 1. Netflix.
- Caro, Manolo (October 18, 2019). "ROSE, (Symb unity)". The House of Flowers. Season 2. Netflix.
- El Colombiano (November 2, 2019). "Lanzan episodio sorpresa de la Casa de las Flores" [Surprise episode of la Casa de las Flores released]. El Colombiano (in European Spanish). EFE.
- Betancourt, Manuel (November 4, 2019). "TRAILER: Netflix Drops Extra Episode of 'La Casa de las Flores' to Explain What Happened at the Funeral". Remezcla.
- Soto, Vanesa (November 4, 2019). "La Casa de las Flores lanza un capítulo sorpresa (y es lo más)" [La Casa de las Flores releases a surprise episode (and it's the best)]. Vanidad (in Spanish).
- El Sol de México (November 2, 2019). "Así fue el funeral de Virginia de la Mora en La Casa de las Flores" [It was the funeral of Virginia de la Mora on La Casa de las Flores] (in Spanish).
- Puentes, Patricia (2019a). "La casa de las flores 3: Estreno, reparto y lo que esperamos la próxima temporada" [La casa de las flores 3: Release, cast and everything to expect in the next season]. CNET en Español (in Spanish).
- García, Ángel (August 25, 2018). "Verónica Castro no regresará a La casa de las flores: Manolo Caro" [Verónica Castro will not return to La casa de las flores]. Forbes México (in Spanish).
- Balán, Ángel (November 7, 2019). "El Funeral de 'La Casa de las Flores', la apertura perfecta de la segunda temporada" [The Funeral of 'La Casa de las Flores', the perfect start for the second season]. La Verdad (in Spanish).
- Milenio (November 1, 2019). "Netflix revela lo que pasó en el funeral de Virginia en 'La casa de las flores'" [Netflix reveals what happened at the funeral of Virginia in 'La casa de las flores'] (in Spanish).
- Cueva, Álvaro (November 1, 2019). "'La casa de las Flores, el funeral'". Milenio (in Spanish).
