= El club de los idealistas =

- Theatrical release poster
- Directed by: Marcelo Tobar
- Screenplay by: Marcelo Tobar
- Story by: Marcelo Tobar; Marcela Fuentes-Berain
- Produced by: Rodrigo Juárez; Jack Zagha Kababie; Jesus Manuel Munoz; Jesús Muñoz; Elsa Reyes; Alejandro Sánchez de la Peña; Marcelo Tobar; Oscar Uriel; Yossy Zagha
- Starring: Juan Pablo Medina; Claudia Ramírez; Tiaré Scanda; Nailea Norvind; Andrés Palacios; Yolanda Ventura; Tomás Rojas
- Production companies: Avanti Pictures; La Torre y El Mar; Zensky Cine
- Release date: September 24, 2020
- Running time: 101 minutes
- Country: Mexico
- Language: Spanish
- Box office: $368,991

El club de los idealistas (lit. 'The club of idealists') is a 2020 Mexican comedy-drama film written and directed by Marcelo Tobar. It features Juan Pablo Medina, Claudia Ramírez, Tiaré Scanda, Nailea Norvind, Andrés Palacios, Yolanda Ventura and Tomás Rojas. It premiered on September 24, 2020, in Mexican theaters.

== Synopsis ==
Seven young university students swear that they will buy a large piece of land to build their houses there and all live together when they are old. However, the young Aranas in his forties is the only one who settles on earth and invites his friends to a meeting, to a party, so they can see what he has already done of what they had promised.

== Cast ==
The actors participating in this film are:

- Juan Pablo Medina as Aranas
- Claudia Ramírez as Tristana
- Tiaré Scanda as Susana
- Nailea Norvind as Abigael
- Andrés Palacios as Orlando
- Yolanda Ventura as Elena
- Tomás Rojas as Omar
- Víctor González as Gabriel
- Gisselle Kuri as Tili
- Daniela Schmidt as Paulina
- Juan Pablo Hermida as Lorenzo

== Reception ==
=== Critical reception ===
The film holds a 91% rating on Rotten Tomatoes.

Javier Quintanar Polanco from Tomatazos highlights the work on the script, calling it sensitive and intelligent in his proposal, avoiding easy laughter through silly gags or offensive stereotypes; however, it also highlights that the themes of middle age and the development of the other characters other than Aranas feel wasted but it is compensated by the acting work of all the cast members.

On the other hand, Luis Angel H. Mora from Cine Premiere criticizes the script, calling it mediocre in terms of character creation, full of clichés and archetypes of forty-somethings whose narrative and comedy become very predictable with forced endings; however, the photographic work of Ramón Orozco Stolbenberg stands out, who manages to turn the environment into one more character.

=== Accolades ===
Year	Award	Category	Recipient	Result	Ref.
2021	Ariel Awards	Best Actor	Juan Pablo Medina	Nominated	
2021	Ariel Awards	Best Supporting Actress	Nailea Norvind	Nominated	
