= Elvira I Will Give You My Life but I'm Using It =

- Theatrical release poster
- Original title: Elvira, te daría mi vida pero la estoy usando
- Directed by: Manolo Caro
- Written by: Manolo Caro
- Produced by: Rafael Ley; Carla Perez; Alex García; Santiago Garcia
- Starring: Cecilia Suárez; Luis Gerardo Méndez; Vanessa Bauche; Angie Cepeda; Carlos Bardem
- Cinematography: Mateo Londono
- Edited by: Jorge García
- Music by: Tomás Barreiro; Pablo Chemor
- Production companies: Woo Films; Itaca Films
- Distributed by: Cinépolis Distribución
- Release dates: October 22, 2014 (Morelia International Film Festival); August 14, 2015 (Mexico)
- Running time: 97 minutes
- Country: Mexico
- Language: Spanish

Elvira I Will Give You My Life But I'm Using It (Spanish: Elvira, te daría mi vida pero la estoy usando) is a 2014 Mexican comedy-drama film written and directed by Manolo Caro. It stars Cecilia Suárez, Luis Gerardo Méndez and Vanessa Bauche. It was one of fourteen films shortlisted by Mexico to be their submission for the Academy Award for Best Foreign Language Film at the 88th Academy Awards, but it lost out to 600 Miles.

== Plot ==
Elvira (Cecilia Suárez), a 40-year-old woman, is a stay-at-home mother with two children while her husband, Gustavo (Carlos Bardem), works at an insurance company to support the family. One night, Gustavo tells his wife that he is going for cigars and does not return.

Concerned about her husband, Elvira comes to seek him and files a missing person, because she believes that he suffered an accident. As time passes, she continues with her quest and begins to find reasons to suspect that her husband has escaped with his lover.

== Cast ==
- Cecilia Suárez as Elvira
- Luis Gerardo Méndez as Ricardo
- Vanessa Bauche as Luisa
- Angie Cepeda as Eloy
- Carlos Bardem as Gustavo
- Angélica Aragón as Mamá de Elvira
- Juan Carlos Colombo as Don Ruti
- Alfonso Dosal as Pepe
- Juan Pablo Medina as Ejecutivo
- Zuria Vega as Ana
- Mariana Treviño as Guille
- María Elena Saldaña as Portera
- Silverio Palacios as Don Chuy
