= Love of My Loves =

- Spanish: Amor de mis amores
- Directed by: Manolo Caro
- Starring: Sandra Echeverría; Marimar Vega; Sebastián Zurita; Erick Elias; Juan Pablo Medina
- Cinematography: Daniel Jacobs
- Edited by: Jorge García
- Production companies: Addiction House; Itaca Films
- Distributed by: Latam Pictures
- Release date: 4 September 2014 (Mexico)
- Country: Mexico
- Language: Spanish

Love of My Loves (Spanish: Amor de mis amores) is a 2014 romantic comedy film directed by Manolo Caro. The film was produced by the Zurita's brothers company Addiction House, and Itaca Films, and it premiered on 4 September 2014 in Mexico. It stars Sandra Echeverría, Juan Pablo Medina, Marimar Vega, Sebastián Zurita and Erick Elías. The film is an adaptation of stage play Un, dos, tres por mí y todos mis amores. The plot revolves around a woman believed to have fallen in love with a stranger who also goes to the altar, so their lives change radically.

== Cast ==
- Sandra Echeverría as Lucía
- Marimar Vega as Ana
- Sebastián Zurita as León
- Erick Elias as Javier
- Juan Pablo Medina as Carlos
- Mariana Treviño as Shaila
- Rossy de Palma as Carmina
- Lorena Velázquez as Susana
- Itatí Cantoral as Elvira
- Camila Sodi as Andrea
- Arap Bethke as Andrea's boyfriend
- Mauricio Barrientos as Tomás
- Camila Selser as Bea
- Sol Méndez Roy as Azafata
- Ximena García as Wedding Planner
