= Perfect Strangers (2018 film) =

- Directed by: Manolo Caro
- Written by: Paolo Genovese
- Screenplay by: Paola Mammini; Rolando Ravello; Paolo Costella; Filippo Bologna
- Based on: Perfetti sconosciuti 2016 film by Paolo Genovese
- Produced by: Manolo Caro; Leonardo Cordero; Maria Jose Cordova; Rodrigo Gonzalez; Rafael Ley; Miguel Mier
- Starring: Bruno Bichir; Mariana Treviño; Cecilia Suárez
- Cinematography: Pedro Gómez Millán
- Edited by: Miguel Musálem
- Music by: Rodrigo Dávila
- Production companies: Cinépolis Producciones; Woo Films; Noc Noc Cinema
- Distributed by: Cinépolis Distribución; Pantelion Films; Lionsgate Home Entertainment
- Release date: 25 December 2018 (Mexico)
- Running time: 97 minutes
- Country: Mexico
- Language: Spanish

Perfect Strangers (Spanish: Perfectos desconocidos) is a 2018 Mexican comedy film directed by Manolo Caro. It is an adaptation of the 2016 Italian film. The film premiered on 25 December 2018, and stars Bruno Bichir, Mariana Treviño, and Cecilia Suárez.

== Plot summary ==
The plot revolves around seven friends who gather for dinner and agree to participate in a game where they will have to read all the messages on their cell phones, giving rise to a series of discussions and misunderstandings and revelations of unexpected truths.

== Cast ==
- Bruno Bichir as Alonso
- Mariana Treviño as Flora
- Cecilia Suárez as Eva
- Manuel Garcia-Rulfo as Mario
- Ana Claudia Talancón as Ana
- Miguel Rodarte as Ernesto
- Franky Martín as Pepe

== Production ==
In November 2017 Cinépolis showed Álex de la Iglesia's 2017 Spanish version to the Manolo Caro production team and proposed the project of a Mexican version. Caro immediately accepted; it was his first remake and the first production of Cinépolis.
