= Someone Has to Die =

Spanish thriller television limited series

- Spanish: Alguien tiene que morir
- Genre: Thriller
- Created by: Manolo Caro
- Written by: Fernando Pérez; Monika Revilla; Manolo Caro
- Starring: Carmen Maura; Cecilia Suárez; Ernesto Alterio; Ester Expósito
- Countries of origin: Spain; Mexico
- Original language: Spanish
- No. of seasons: 1
- No. of episodes: 3

Production
- Executive producers: Rafael Ley; María José Córdova; Carlos Taibo; Manolo Caro
- Production company: Noc Noc Cinema

Original release
- Network: Netflix
- Release: 16 October 2020

Someone Has to Die (Spanish: Alguien tiene que morir) is a Spanish-Mexican thriller television limited series created by Manolo Caro, creator of the Netflix series The House of Flowers. The series takes place in 1950s Spain and consists of three episodes revolving around a conservative and traditional society during the Franco regime "where appearances and family ties play a key role". The series features an all-star cast, including Carmen Maura and Caro regular Cecilia Suárez. All three episodes were released simultaneously by Netflix on October 16, 2020.

== Synopsis ==
A young man is recalled to Spain from Mexico by his wealthy family after a 10-year absence as they have found a suitable young woman for him to marry. However, he brings a male ballet dancer with him, sending shockwaves through his conservative town.

== Cast ==
An extensive cast list was published in October 2019 by Cosmopolitan.

- Carmen Maura as Amparo Falcón
- Cecilia Suárez as Mina Falcón
- Ernesto Alterio as Gregorio Falcón
- Alejandro Speitzer as Gabino Falcón
- Isaac Hernández as Lázaro
- Ester Expósito as Cayetana Aldama
- Carlos Cuevas as Alonso Aldama
- Mariola Fuentes as Rosario
- Pilar Castro as Belén Aldama
- Juan Carlos Vellido as Santos Aldama
- Eduardo Casanova as Carlos
- Manuel Morón as Don Federico

== Production ==
After his successful Netflix series The House of Flowers, Caro was signed to an exclusive deal with the streaming company, and began production on a new three-part miniseries, Someone Has to Die. As well as co-producing and directing, Caro co-wrote the show with Fernando Pérez and Monika Revilla; Caro's production company, Noc Noc Cinema, is credited as the main production company on the show. The show deals with themes of homophobia, conservatism, family, and change against a backdrop of 1950s Spain.

The show is Caro's first work entirely made in Spain, and his first non-comedic work. Some parts of the second season of The House of Flowers had been set in Spain, with Manuel Betancourt of Remezcla suggesting that the country had become his "latest muse". The show began filming in Madrid on 23 October 2019.

Caro has called the cast of the show "a dream"; he had worked with several of them before: Suárez is his constant collaborator and Casanova was in the Spanish scenes of The House of Flowers. Betancourt wrote that the inclusion of "Pedro Almodóvar's OG muse" in Maura made the series a "must-see event". Maura had visited Caro and Suárez while they were filming in Madrid for The House of Flowers in February 2019 to discuss the show. It is the first acting role for Mexican ballet dancer Hernández, who is "considered one of the best dancers in the world". John Hopewell of Variety wrote that, by putting actors like Maura and Suárez together, Caro was "furthering [the] Spanish-language star system".

== Episodes ==
No.	Title	Directed by	Written by	Original release date
1	"Release the Prey" (Soltar la presa)	Manolo Caro	Manolo Caro, Monika Revilla, & Fernando Pérez	October 16, 2020
Siblings Alonso and Cayetana Aldama practice their pigeon-shooting at a prestigious country club as Cayetana informs her brother that Gabino Falcón of the Falcón family has returned to Spain after 10 years abroad in Mexico. Gabino surprises his conservative family by bringing his Mexican friend Lázaro to stay with them at the Falcón manor. Unbeknownst to his family, Gabino is secretly gay. During dinner, the Falcón matriarch, Amparo, loudly voices her disapproval of Lázaro's profession as a ballet dancer and chastises her Mexican daughter-in-law, Mina, when she is seen being friendly towards Rosario, the maid. Mina's husband, Gregorio, is a high-ranking government official who coerces Mina into having sex; Mina falls in love with Lázaro after seeing him practice ballet in the foyer. The next day, Gabino encounters a hostile Alonso, a childhood friend and also secretly gay, at the country club as Mina discusses Gabino's arranged marriage to Cayetana with Cayetana's mother, Belén. Alonso tells his friends that Gabino is a homosexual and believes that Gabino and Lázaro are lovers. Alonso notices Cayetana's interest in Lázaro and sends her home. Meanwhile, Gregorio meets with the head of the Aldama family, Santos, in order to discuss the terms of opening a new shoe factory with the permission of Franco's government. Back at the manor, Rosario pleads with Mina to give her Gregorio's official government stamp so her husband can be released from prison. Mina agrees, and attempts to swipe her husband's stamp from his office but ultimately fails. Gregorio arranges for Gabino to meet with Alonso about an executive position at the new Aldama factory but walks out before the interview is over. That night, Gabino, Lázaro, and Cayetana go to see El Rapto in town, after which Cayetana kisses Lázaro. Furious, Gabino kicks Cayetana out of the car and drives around a street corner where he kisses Lázaro. Lázaro rebukes him, saying Gabino has made a mistake, and exits the car. Upon arriving home, Gabino tells Gregorio that he will never be the son he wants him to be.
2	"Take Aim" (Tomar puntería)	Manolo Caro	Manolo Caro, Monika Revilla, & Fernando Pérez	October 16, 2020
Amparo, suspicious of Rosario's closeness to Mina, asks Rosario invasive questions about her status as a widow. Meanwhile, Mina travels with Gabino to the Aldama house to apologize for Gabino's treatment of Cayetana but he exits the car at a stoplight before they arrive. He goes to the country club to practice his pigeon-shooting alongside Alonso, who still treats Gabino with disgust. At the Falcón manor, Rosario accidentally walks in on Lázaro and Mina slow dancing. Amparo confronts Mina about Rosario being a communist like her imprisoned husband, and threatens to notify the police. Mina blackmails Amparo with a secret letter Gabino wrote 10 years earlier implicating Amparo in the death of her elderly husband, which resulted in a traumatized Gabino being sent to live in Mexico with Mina's parents. Lázaro goes on a date with Cayetana to a carnival, but leaves after she tries to kiss him. Angered at being ditched, Cayetana adds fuel to circulating rumors that Gabino and Lázaro are a homosexual couple. Gregorio is informed of these rumors by Santos, and takes Gabino to a government detention center where gay men are tortured to reveal the identities of other gay men. Amparo searches for the secret letter throughout the manor. Rosario attempts to visit her husband in prison but lacks the courage to make the journey. An altercation between Alonso and Gabino at the country club leads to both Gabino and Lázaro being kidnapped by Alonso and his friends. Alonso forces Lázaro to dance for the group before beating him and Gabino. Gregorio's job is threatened by rumors of Gabino's homosexuality; Mina arranges for Gabino and Lázaro to escape via night train to Paris. Alonso visits a cruising ground and fantasizes about having sex with men, but cannot bring himself to do so.
3	"Pull the Trigger" (Apretar el gatillo)	Manolo Caro	Manolo Caro, Monika Revilla, & Fernando Pérez	October 16, 2020
Police apprehend Gabino at the train station as Lázaro escapes. He is taken to the detention center for homosexual men where Gregorio sees guards torture Gabino for Lázaro's location. He calls them off and attempts to reason with his son. Alonso meets with his father and learns that the new factory plans have been put on hold due to the scandal surrounding the Falcón family. Lázaro sneaks into the country club and sends word to Mina to meet him there. Alonso visits Gabino and gives him a handgun to hide on his person. Unable to find the secret letter at the manor, Amparo blackmails Rosario into giving her the key to Mina's personal locker at the country club. Rosario complies, only to learn later that her husband has died from pneumonia in prison. Amparo gives a speech at the country club's pigeon-shooting competition where Cayetana and her friends compete. She goes to Mina's locker but does not find the secret letter. Rosario delivers the secret letter to Gregorio by folding it into his dress shirt before disappearing. Gregorio reads the letter and searches for Rosario but finds her quarters deserted. He arranges for Gabino to be released into his custody. A waitress informs Cayetana that she saw Lázaro in the woods outside the country club. Cayetana finds Lázaro and Mina having sex. She informs Amparo, who arranges for the couple to be arrested by the club's security. Cayetana attempts to free Lázaro but reveals her good intentions to be a ruse and mocks him for believing her. Meanwhile, Amparo meets with Mina, where she confesses to having killed her husband in front of Gabino. Gregorio arrives at the club and confronts his mother. Gabino sits in the car with Alonso, who asks Gabino about what it is like to have sex with a man. Gabino recounts the story of losing his virginity, which brings Alonso to tears. Alonso tries to commit suicide but Gabino stops him. They see Gregorio dragging Lázaro outside and chase after them. In a clearing, Gregorio holds Lázaro and Mina at gunpoint. He goads Gabino into shooting them for their adultery but Alonso uses the gun he gave Gabino to shoot and kill Gregorio. Amparo appears and kills Alonso. She hunts Lázaro down, fatally shooting him in the chest before turning her attention towards Mina. Gabino and Amparo engage in an armed standoff which ends when Gabino shoots her. Mina and Gabino stand over Lázaro's body, leaving their fates uncertain.

== Awards and nominations ==
Year	Award	Category	Nominee(s)	Result	Ref.
2021	32nd GLAAD Media Awards	Outstanding Spanish-Language Scripted Television Series		Nominated	
