= Juan Pablo Medina =

American actor

- Born: October 22, 1977 (age 48); Arlington, Virginia, United States
- Occupation: Actor
- Years active: 2001–present
- Spouse: Jimena Carranza (May 2016 - June 2016)

Juan Pablo Medina (born October 22, 1977) is an American actor. He is best known for his portrayal of Ulises, the lead character on the TV Azteca drama series Drenaje profundo.

== Biography ==
He began his career in the Mexican telenovela Cuando seas mía. He is a graduate of CEFAC, the acting school of Televisión Azteca, company for which he worked several years (2000-2013).

In July 2021, Medina was hospitalized for a venous thrombosis that necessitated the amputation of his right leg.

== Selected filmography ==
=== Films ===
Year	Title	Roles	Notes
2001	La segunda noche	Muchacho Coche	
2004	Cero y van 4	Alfonso "El Torzón"	
2005	La última noche	Sergio	
2006	Alta infidelidad	Leonardo	
2007	Cañitas	Fernando	
2008	El garabato	Rodolfo	
2012	Espacio interior	Young Pedro	
2013	Sobre ella	Daniel	
2013	No sé si cortarme las venas o dejármelas largas	Botarga	
2014	Cásese quien pueda	Mariano	
2014	Amor de mis amores	Carlos	
2014	The Perfect Dictatorship	Boyfriend	
2014	Elvira, te daría mi vida pero la estoy usando	Executive	
2016	Sr. Pig	Customs Agent	
2016	Treintona, soltera y fantástica	Sensei	
2016	Tales of an Immoral Couple	Igor	
2017	Casi una gran estafa	Adalberto	
2018	Eres mi pasión	Armando	
2019	Ready to Mingle	Diego	
2019	This Is Tomas	Don T	
2019	Un papá pirata	Gaspar	
2019	Guadalupe Reyes	Hugo	
2019	The House of Flowers Presents: The Funeral	Diego Olvera	Short film
2020	El club de los idealistas	Aranas	
2025	Lucca's World	Andrés	

=== Television roles ===
Year	Title	Role	Notes
2001	Cuando seas mía	Bernardo Sánchez Zambrano	
2001	Lo que callamos las mujeres	Rodolfo	Episode: "Todo a la venta"
2002	El País de las mujeres	Diego	
2003	Enamórate	Samuel	
2004	Soñarás	Alfredo	
2004	Las cinco caras del amor	Eliseo	
2004–05	La vida es una canción	Mario	3 episodes
2006	Ljubav u zaledju	Enrique Castillo	8 episodes
2007	Se busca un hombre	Armando	
2009	Eternamente tuya	Iván	
2010–11	Drenaje profundo	Ulises Elizalde	Main role, 20 episodes
2010–12	Soy tu fan	Iñaki Díaz de Olavarrieta	25 episodes
2012	Amor cautivo	Efraín Valdemar	
2013	Secretos de familia	Juan Pablo	
2014	Amor sin reserva	Óscar Padilla	
2016	Sin rastro de ti	Tomás	
2017	Sincronía	Alberto	4 episodes
2017	Blue Demon	Doctor Buelna	Episode: "Que vivan los novios"
2017	Guerra de ídolos	Amado Matamoros	Main role
2018	La casa de las flores	Diego Olvera	13 episodes
2018	Ingobernable	General Rául Mejía	10 episodes
2025	Serpientes y Escaleras	Olmo Muriel	10 episodes
2026	Doc	Dr. Andrés Ferrara	Main role
