= Manolo Caro =

Mexican director (born 1985)

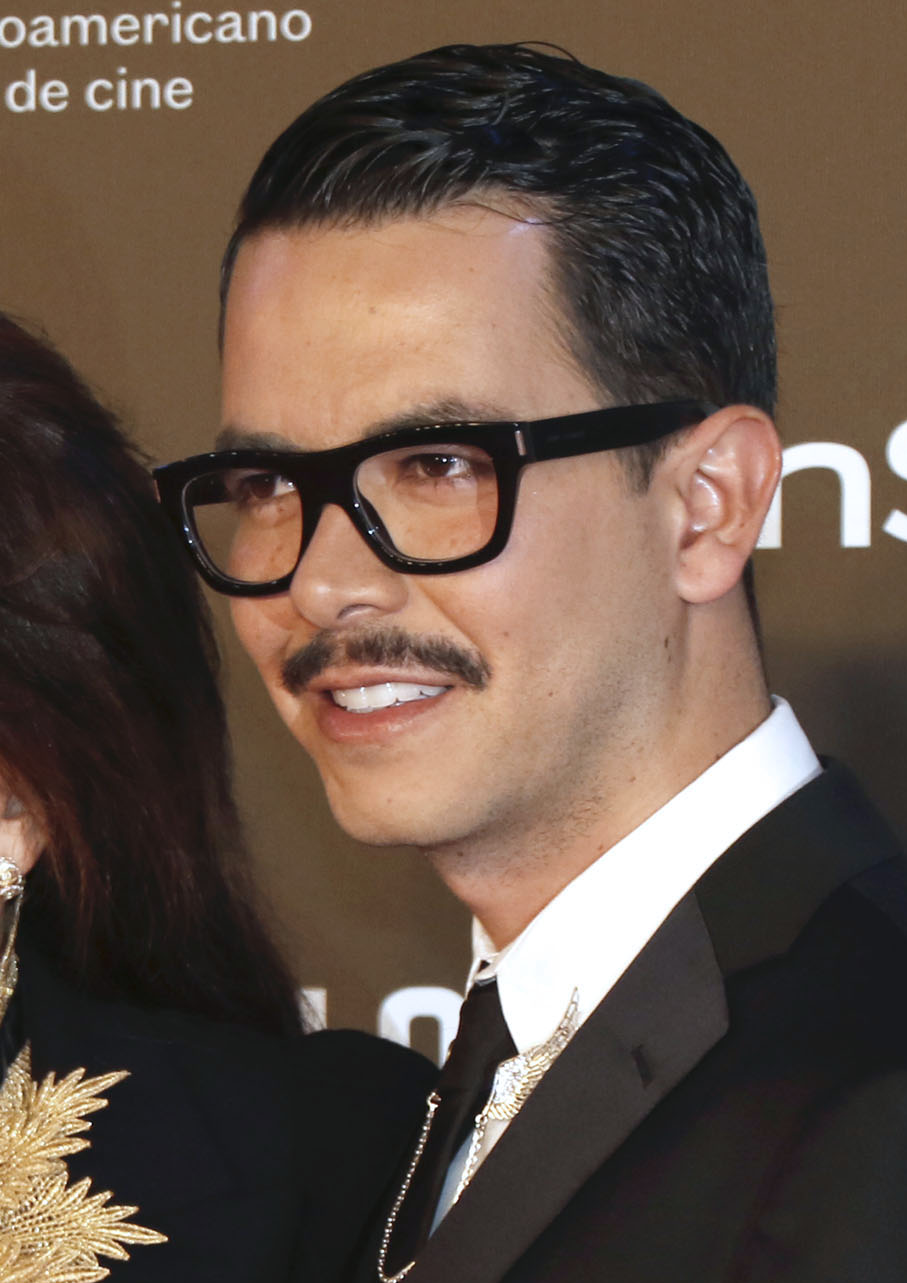
- Caro in December 2017
- Born: Manuel Caro Serrano; 1985 (age 40–41); Guadalajara, Jalisco, Mexico
- Occupations: Director, producer
- Years active: 2004–present

Manolo Caro (born 1985) is a Mexican director, known for films including Tales of an Immoral Couple and the Netflix series The House of Flowers and Someone Has To Die. He also directed the film Perfect Strangers. All of these star Caro's frequent collaborator Cecilia Suárez.

== Early life ==
He was born in Guadalajara, Jalisco, in 1985, son of Norma Alicia Serrano and Gil Caro. He studied architecture at the TEC de Monterrey, Mexico City campus, and later studied directing at the International Film School of San Antonio de los Baños, in Cuba, and at the studio of Juan Carlos Corazza, in Madrid.

Caro first met Cecilia Suárez when he was a teenager and she visited his high school to listen to a reading of Los cuervos están de luto; the pair were introduced after the reading by his teacher, Suárez' cousin.

== Career ==
Caro has his own production company, called Noc Noc Cinema, which is a division of Woo Films. By November 2019, the Woo/Noc Noc body of development was seen as one of the strongest across both TV and film in Mexico.

His first feature film was 2013's No sé si cortarme las venas o dejármelas largas, which he adapted from a play he wrote. He is the only Mexican director to have been in the country's box office top ten for three consecutive years.

In May 2019, Caro signed an exclusive four-year deal with streaming platform Netflix, which had hosted his show The House of Flowers since 2018, to create more television shows; at the time he was developing Someone Has To Die for the platform; the Netflix Latin America and Spain VP said of Caro at the time that he has a "great talent [...] for relevant, unique and personal stories [that] makes him one of the most interesting and playful voices of his generation". Suárez has said that Caro's background as an architect allows him to find new and unique angles for filming, adding that he also finds unique spots with characters.

Of Caro's works up to 2019, only Amor de mis amores does not star Suárez.

Caro is openly gay.

== Filmography ==
=== Film ===
Year	Title	Director	Writer	Producer	Notes
2004	Motel	Yes	No	No	Short
2007	Gente bien... atascada	Yes	No	No	Short
2008	Lulú la del pez	Yes	No	No	Short
2013	No sé si cortarme las venas o dejármelas largas	Yes	Yes	No	
2014	La fabulosa y patética historia de un montaje I Love Romeo y Julieta	Yes	No	No	Documentary
2013	Amor de mis amores	Yes	Yes	No	Does not star Suárez
2014	Elvira, te daría mi vida pero la estoy usando	Yes	Yes	No	
2016	Tales of an Immoral Couple	Yes	Yes	Yes	
2018	Perfectos desconocidos	Yes	No	Yes	
2024	Fiesta en la Madriguera	Yes	No	Yes	Based on a novel by Juan Pablo Villalobos
TBA	Straight	Yes	No	No	Adaptation from theatre; Caro also directed the stage play in its Latin American debut
TBA	Extraños Que Se Besan	No	Yes	No	With Natalia García Agraz

=== Television ===
Year(s)	Title	Director	Writer	Producer	Network	Notes
2018–2020	The House of Flowers	Yes	Yes	Yes	Netflix	
2020	Someone Has To Die	Yes	Yes	Yes	Netflix	
2022	Once Upon a Time... Happily Never After	Yes	Yes	Yes	Netflix	
2022–2023	Holy Family	Yes	Yes	Yes	Netflix	
2025–	Snakes and Ladders	Yes	Yes	Yes	Netflix	

=== Awards ===
Year	Award	Category	Nominated work	Result	Ref.
2025	Premios Aura	Leyenda (Legend)	Whole oeuvre	Won	
