= Arturo Ríos =

Mexican actor

- Born: Arturo Lorenzo Ríos Caldelas; Mexico City, Mexico
- Education: Instituto de Arte Dramático Andrés Soler (1973-1975)
- Occupation: Actor

Arturo Ríos is a Mexican actor.

== Career ==
Rios is largely a theatrical actor, but has also starred in films and on television.

He won the Ariel Award for Best Actor for his performance in the movie Fairy Tales for Sleeping Crocodiles, taking another Best Actor nomination for Desiertos mares.

In theater he has participated in more than 80 works and has won two awards as best actor: one for El otra exilo and the other for Devastated. He has been an actor of the National Theater Company and the Theater Experimentation Center (INBA). He was the founder of the Taller del Sótano theater group and is part of Por Piedad Teatro. He has also worked with Shadow Line Theater and Arena Theater. He has been a FONCA Fellow twice, first for playing Richard II in the Shakespeare play, and second as a Scenic Creator with Outstanding Career for the works "The Lesson" by Ionesco, "Shakespeare: his Invention" by Arturo Ríos, and "The Golden Dragon", by Roland Schimmelpfennig.

== Filmography ==
=== Telenovelas ===
- Educando a Nina (2018) as José Peralta
- La candidata (2017) as Fernando Escalante
- El alma herida (2003-2004) as Marcial
- Gitanas (2004) as Drago
- El sexo débil (2011) as Agustín Camacho

=== Television ===
- El vuelo del águila (1994) as Ignacio de la Torre y Mier
- Al norte del corazón (1997)
- Yacaranday (1998) as Omar
- Tentaciones (1998) as Javier
- Cuentos para solitarios (1999)
- The House of Flowers (2018) as Ernesto De La Mora

=== Films ===
Ríos has starred in films including:

- Fantoche (1977) as Félix
- Sólo con Tu Pareja (1991) as Singer in nightmare sequence
- Desiertos mares (1995) as Juan Aguirre
- Between Pancho Villa and a Naked Woman (1996) as Adrián.
- De ida y vuelta (2000)
- Y Tu Mamá También as Esteban Morelos
- Cuentos de hadas para dormir cocodrilos (2002) as Archangel and Archangel Miguel
- Ópera (2007) as Pablo
- Cementerio de papel (2007) as Hugo
- Insignificant Things (2008) as Tomás
- Eddie Reynolds y los ángeles de acero (2014) as Santos
- Apapacho: una caricia al alma (2018) as George

=== Theatre ===
His latest roles include:

- Old Times
- The End, a monologue by Samuel Beckett
- Hamlet
