= List of programmes broadcast by Astro Bella =

This is a list programs broadcast by Astro Bella.

== Current programmes ==
=== Mexico (Viva Latina) ===
- Amor Cautivo
- La Otra Cara del Alma

=== Colombia ===
- Amar y temer
- Primera dama

=== Philippines (Lara Asia) ===
- Chances
- Golden Heart
- Grazilda
- In Love Again
- Majika
- More Than Love
- Pangako Sayo
- Walang Hanggan

=== United States ===
- Grachi

=== Dramas from Astro Mustika HD (Dramathon) ===
- Bercakap Dengan Jin
- Bukan Kerana Aku Tak Cinta
- Kusinero Cinta
- Sahangat Amara

== Former programmes ==
=== Colombia ===
- El secretario

=== Mexico ===
- Drowning City (Drenaje profundo)
- Emperatriz
- Forever Yours (Eternamente tuya)
- La usurpadora
- The Force of Destiny (La fuerza del destino)
- Infamia (Torn Apart)
- Pasión morena
- Pobre diabla Daniela
- Quererte así

=== Korea ===
- What Women Want (당돌한 여자)

=== Italy ===
- Girlfriends (Amiche mie)
- Surgeons (La scelta di Laura)

=== Philippines ===
- Beauty Queen
- Budoy
- Destined Hearts (Dahil May Isang Ikaw)
- Encantadia
- Fish Port Princess (Prinsesa ng Banyera)
- Heaven with You (Langit sa Piling Mo)
- Imortal
- Impostor (Precious Hearts Romances Presents: Impostor)
- Impostora
- My Only One (Iisa Pa Lamang)
- Rivals (Magkaribal)
- Stand for Love (Gulong ng Palad)
- To Love You (Ikaw Sana)
- The Two of Us (Tayong Dalawa)
- Until Forever (Ngayon at Kailanman)

=== Portugal ===
- Cidade Despida
- Direct Flight (Voo Directo)

=== United Arab Emirates ===
- Critical Moments (Lahazat Harega)
