= Grandma's Wedding =

2019 Mexican romantic comedy film directed by Javier Colinas

- Film poster
- Spanish: La boda de la abuela
- Directed by: Javier Colinas
- Screenplay by: Adriana Pelusi
- Story by: Luis Arrieta; Javier Colinas
- Starring: Susana Alexander; Dino García; Luis Arrieta
- Production company: Corazón Films
- Distributed by: Netflix
- Release date: 11 October 2019
- Running time: 97 minutes
- Countries: Mexico; Spain
- Languages: Spanish; Portuguese; English

Grandma's Wedding (Spanish: La boda de la abuela) is a 2019 Mexican romantic comedy film written and directed by Javier Colinas. The film stars Susana Alexander, Dino García and Luis Arrieta in the lead roles. It is a sequel to the 2015 film El cumple de la abuela (Grandma's Birthday). The film was predominantly shot in Cuernavaca, Morelos. The film was released on 11 October 2019 and received mixed reviews from critics. Most of the crew members who were part of the prequel were retained for the sequel. It was also streamed via Netflix on 5 February 2020.

A third film, Grandma's Last Wishes, completed the trilogy in 2020.

== Plot ==
Grandma has finally decided to marry her much younger gardener Julio who for years has been the caretaker of her house in Cuernavaca.

Francisco and Natalia have given birth to a boy. Francisco is a strict environmentalist and controls his son's diet, hobbies and daily activities, much to the annoyance of Gerardo whenever he tries to play with or entertain him. Gerardo is expecting a son of his own with Diana.

Juan Pablo has become an amateur musician online and he purchased an engagement ring which Ana found beforehand; in her shock, she refuses to let him attend the wedding. Andrea has formally entered a relationship with Sebastian. He and Daniel are still at odds over this, which makes her also stay away from the wedding. Sebastian has published a book about the events of the first film.

Grandma asks Ana to use her husband's old VHS camcorder to record the wedding as the in-laws arrive. Julio's family is much poorer, driving a muddy truck. They consist of: Aurora, the mom, and his three siblings Rafael, Julia and Julieta. Aurora initially confuses Natalia with the woman Julio is about to marry, and is horrified when Julio clarifies he is marrying Grandma. Grandma tries to cheer them up with falsehoods about how well-connected and cheerful the family is.

Relations sour when the families attempt to introduce each other, Julio's siblings see them all as haughty rich chilangos. Julia finds Sebastian's book and starts reading it, revealing the family's true nature. The family orders takeout and disguise it as their own cooking.

Juan Pablo arrives unannounced and is scolded by Ana. Sebastian reveals Andrea is pregnant to Ana. Ana sees Juan Pablo and Julieta becoming physically closer and starts becoming jealous, threatening her and pinching her.

Aurora gives Grandma one last chance to prove her family's innocence by watching her cook (to prove her ability). She fails as she has not cooked in decades. The family leaves in disgust, only to return later that day after realizing how outlandish Sebastian's stories sound.

Ana videocalls Andrea and she emphasizes her true love to Sebastian. Gerardo tries to instill an interest in classical music in his unborn child. Julia and Daniel realize they like the same football team (Cruz Azul), begin to kiss and have sex. Rafael and Sebastian get drunk and the latter convinces the former to be more open about what he thinks. Juan Pablo teaches Julieta a guitar song, but rejects her intimate advances. Aurora stays up all night to fix her family's hand-me-down wedding dress so it fits Grandma.

On the day of the wedding, Ana and Julieta reconcile. Rafael and Sebastian find an undressed Daniel and Julia walking out of Daniel's room, and Rafael immediately flies into a rage. He chases Daniel around the house with a gun in his hand. Just as Grandma and Julio are exchanging vows, Daniel runs straight into the wedding where Rafael starts making a scene with the gun. He accidentally shoots it, only for Sebastian to take the bullet for Daniel. He is not seriously injured, and the two reconcile in the hospital.

The very next day, the wedding goes as previously planned. The family has miraculously reconciled with Rafael and they all have fun. Andrea returns uninvited. Ana proposes to Juan Pablo with a song she hastily prepared and he accepts. Aurora and Grandma clink glasses and accept each other.

In a mid-credits scene, Julio gives Grandma a foot massage and strips for her.

== Cast ==
- Susana Alexander as Abuela
- Dino García as Julio
- Luis Arrieta as Daniel
- Luis Ernesto Franco as Sebastián
- Antonio Gaona as Juan Pablo
- Armando Hernández as Rafael
- Paola Núñez as Andrea
- Renata Notni as Julieta
- Marimar Vega as Ana
- Tiaré Scanda as Diana
- Macaria as Aurora
