= El cumple de la abuela =

2015 Mexican romantic comedy film directed by Javier Colinas

- Film poster
- Directed by: Javier Colinas
- Screenplay by: Adriana Pelusi; Reynolds Robledo; Tobias Camba; Javier Colinas
- Story by: Luis Arrieta; Javier Colinas; Reynolds Robledo; Tobias Camba
- Produced by: Yadira Pascault Orozco
- Starring: Susana Alexander; Cesar Giraldo; Luis Arrieta
- Cinematography: Juan Pablo Ojeda
- Edited by: Max Blasquez
- Music by: Odilón Chávez
- Production companies: Somos Next; Itaca Films
- Release dates: 13 April 2015 (Chicago Latino Film Festival); 1 January 2016
- Running time: 98 minutes
- Country: Mexico
- Language: Spanish

El cumple de la abuela (transl. Grandma's Birthday) is a 2015 Mexican romantic comedy film written and directed by Javier Colinas. The film stars Susana Alexander, Cesar Giraldo and Luis Arrieta in the lead roles.

The film premiered at the 2015 Chicago Latino Film Festival. The film was later released in Mexico on 1 January 2016 and received mixed reviews from critics.

It was followed by two sequels. Grandma's Wedding, was released in 2019 and opened to mixed reviews. The third film, Grandma's Last Wishes, was released in 2020.

== Synopsis ==
A dysfunctional family travels all the way to Cuernavaca to celebrate Grandma's birthday.

They include a father, Francisco, and his four adult children, Daniel, Sebastian, Ana and Diana.

Ana has recently lost her job and had a one-night stand with a young man named Juan Pablo and (despite knowing him for only one day previously) decides to take him to meet the family.

Diana has had a long-lasting stable marriage with Gerardo but has been unable to get pregnant. Grandma has not taken a liking to him even when he sends her many gifts and cooks nice meals for her.

Daniel's girlfriend Andrea was secretly kissing his brother Sebastian which made Sebastian's then-fiancée break up with him. Grandma thinks Sebastian is gay.

All of these people arrive at the house, but all hell breaks loose when Francisco shows up with his new girlfriend, Natalia.

Sebastian is writing a book where the main character mirrors his own real-life situation (falling in love with his brother's girlfriend) which angers Ana when she finds the manuscript.

Grandma chokes on a peanut and Juan Pablo saves her using a Heimlich maneuver, gaining her respect and admiration. Daniel is injured during a basketball game and given massages by Natalia.

Natalia takes a pregnancy test and finds it is positive. She announces it at the family dinner, and it is met with surprise since Francisco is already 55 years old. Sebastian rekindles his relationship with Andrea, but one member of the family sees them every time they kiss. His father learns about what has been happening between them and talks about how it relates to his own past. He took part in many extra-marital affairs, until he met Natalia who convinced him to quit drinking, convert to Christianity and learn how to cook.

Francisco gets drunk and the four children drag him to bed. In his confusion, he reveals Sebastian's relationship to Daniel, causing the two to get into a fight.

During all of this commotion, no one is watching over Grandma, which allows Julio, the gardener, to seduce her.

The next morning, Grandma is surprisingly more open to Gerardo, Francisco is sober and apologizes for mistreating his kids, and the family sits together. Francisco proposes to Natalia and she accepts. The family leaves, having reconciled with each other. Ana and Juan Pablo decide to take a detour and go on a longer vacation to get to know each other.

In a post-credits scene, Grandma reveals she is going to marry Julio, setting up the plot of the sequel.

== Cast ==
- Susana Alexander as Abuela
- José Carlos Rodriguez as Francisco
- Cesar Giraldo as Julio
- Luis Arrieta as Daniel
- Luis Ernesto Franco as Sebastián
- Antonio Gaona as Juan Pablo
- Martha Claudia Moreno as Natalia
- Paola Núñez as Andrea
- Renata Notni as Julieta
- Marimar Vega as Ana
- Tiaré Scanda as Diana
- Macaria as Aurora
- Rodrigo Murray as Gerardo
- Elba Jimézez as Gema Rubí

== Release ==
It was also streamed on Netflix on 20 December 2016 but was later removed by the platform in December 2017.
