= Ana Serradilla =

Mexican actress (born 1978)

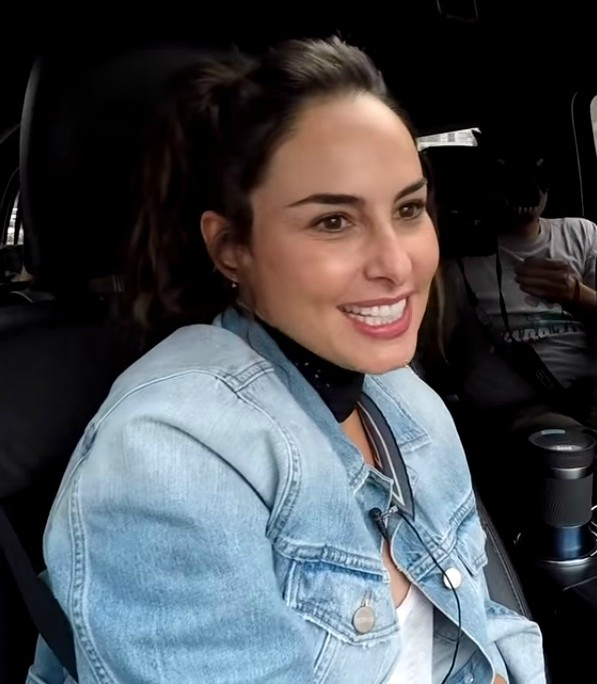
- Born: Ana Isabel Serradilla García; August 9, 1978 (age 46); Mexico City, Distrito Federal, Mexico
- Occupation: Actress
- Height: 5 ft 6 in (168 cm)
- Spouse: Raúl Martinez Ostos

Ana Isabel Serradilla García (born 9 August 1978) is a Mexican actress known for her roles in television series such as La Viuda Negra, Drenaje Profundo, and Línea nocturna. She also starred in the Mexican adaptation of Desperate Housewives, titled Amas de Casa Desesperadas.

== Biography ==
Serradilla is of Spanish descent with roots in Madrid. As a young girl, she dreamed of becoming an actress but was so shy she often could not even answer the phone. She studied acting at the Centro de Estudios y Formación Actoral and got her first job, Chiquititas in 1998. In 2012, she debuted in her first English-language film, Hidden Moon for which she won the Silver Goddess Award for Best Actress. Her theatre credits include Sin Cura and Blackbird.

In 2014, Serradilla portrayed drug lord Griselda Blanco in the TV series La viuda negra.

== Filmography ==
=== Film ===
Year	Title	Role	Notes
2000	El duende del reloj	Ericka	Short film
2001	Un mundo raro	Dianita	
2006	Tired of Kissing Frogs	Martha Zavala	
2006	Sexo, amor y otras perversiones	Mirtha	Segment: "Por amor"
2006	Amor de madre	Sofía	Short film
2007	The Toast	Emilia	
2007	Corazón marchito	Ella	
2007	Eros una vez María	María	
2007	Déficit	Mafer	
2008	All Inclusive	Macarena	
2009	Euforia	Ana	
2010	Preludio	Ella	Also producer
2011	La otra familia	Ivana	
2011	Los inadaptados	Sofía	Also associate producer
2011	Pastorela	Nun	
2012	Espacio interior	María	
2012	Hidden Moon	Miranda Ríos	
2019	Welcome to Acapulco	Adriana Vazquez	
2019	La boda de mi mejor amigo	Julia	
2019	El hubiera sí existe	Elisa	

=== Television roles ===
Year	Title	Role	Notes
1998	Chiquititas	Belén	
1999	La vida en el espejo	Paulita Giraldo de Román	
2001	Cuando seas mía	Daniela Sánchez Zambrano	
2003	Mirada de mujer, el regreso	Carolina	
2004–2005	Las Juanas	Juana Valentina	
2006	Línea nocturna	Ana Lilia Armendáriz	12 episodes
2006	Campeones de la vida	Isabel	64 episodes
2008	Amas de casa desesperadas	Gabriela Solís	
2008	Deseo prohibido	Lucía Santos	
2010–2011	Drenaje profundo	Yamel García	16 episodes
2013	Alguien más	Irene	5 episodes; also as co-producer
2014–2016	La viuda negra	Griselda Blanco	
2015	La esquina del diablo	Ana García / Sara Robles	
2018	Rubirosa	Candelaria Benavente	
2019	Doña Flor y sus dos maridos	María Florencia "Flor" Méndez Canúl	
2022	La rebelión		
