= Lejana como el viento =

- Genre: Telenovela
- Created by: Laura Visconti
- Written by: Laura Visconti; César Sierra; Indira Paez; Rodolfo Boyadjian; Andres Correa
- Directed by: Luis Manzo
- Starring: Zair Montes; Ricardo Bianchi; Elluz Peraza; José Bardina; Arnaldo André
- Opening theme: Lejana como el viento by José Antonio Berdell
- Country of origin: Venezuela
- Original language: Spanish
- No. of episodes: 109

Production
- Executive producer: Miguel Angel Villasmil
- Producer: Stalin Morillo
- Production locations: Caracas, Venezuela
- Cinematography: Salvador Canmarata
- Editor: Manuel Fraiz Grijalba
- Camera setup: Multi-camera
- Running time: 41–44 minutes
- Production company: Venevisión

Original release
- Network: Venevisión
- Release: 19 February – 26 June 2002

Lejana como el viento (Distant like the wind) is a Venezuelan telenovela created by Laura Visconti and broadcast on Venevisión. It premiered on 19 February 2002 and ended on 25 June 2002.

Zair Montes and Ricardo Bianchi as the main protagonists while Henry Soto, Elluz Peraza and Arnaldo André star as the main antagonists.

== Plot ==
Eugenia is eagerly planning her impending wedding to Edmundo, and her friends Fernando, Ramiro and Efrain are surprised at the news and her happy for her as they help in the wedding preparations. However, Eugenia's happiness will be cut short when she discovers a young woman locked up in the basement of Edmundo's home. Eugenia quickly alerts Ramiro who is a police officer about the existence of the secret woman. But Edmundo discovers about it and covers his track before the lady is discovered, and he murders Eugenia. Fernando, Ramiro and Efrain swear to get revenge for the death of their friend. After careful investigation, they eventually find the young woman who is Alejandra Santacruz who has been kept captive for 10 years. Alejandra has lot her memory and her touch with reality. The three men decide to protect her because Eugenia died while trying to save her.

Alejandra stands at the center of a deep family conspiracy. After her rescue, she is taken to the foundation run by Victoria, Fernando's mother. But what no one knows is that Edmundo has been blackmailing Victoria for years because she is responsible for killing Nicolas Santacruz, Alejandra's father. Edmundo extorted money from Victoria for the care of Alejandra, and every month, she received a picture of Alejandra. Fernando develops a close relationship with Alejandra as the young troubled woman seems to only respond to him. Efrain, a psychologist, begins Alejandra's rehabilitation, and he falls in love with her. But Alejandra has already fallen in love with Fernando, thereby forming a love triangle.

Eventually, Victoria discovers Alejandra's existence, and she plans various intrigues involving her husband Jorge who is the mastermind behind Alejandra's kidnapping. Now, the only person who can confront them is Felix de Valle, Alejandra's godfather.

== Cast ==
- Zair Montes - Alejandra Santacruz
- Ricardo Bianchi - Fernando Bustamante
- Elluz Peraza - Victoria de Bustamante
- José Bardina - Félix del Valle
- Arnaldo André - Jorge Bustamante
- Rafael Romero - Ramiro Malavé
- Henry Soto - Edmundo Mavares
- Esperanza Magaz - Cruz
- Raúl Xiqués - Linares
- Javier Varcárcel - Efraín Rivero
- Karina Orozco - América
- José Vieira - Marcelo
- Lourdes Martínez - Mildred
- Esther Orjuela - Zuleima
- Cristina Obín - Gladys
- José Rubens - Rufino
- Reina Hinojosa - Beatriz
- José Paniagua - Isaías
- Daniela Navarro - Mariví
- Damián Genovese - Diego
- Luciano Scorzia - Nilsson
- María Isabel Perozo - Briseida
- Karina Lescarboura - Arolkys
- Silvia Solana - Rebeca
- Saúl Martínez - Guillermo
- Roque Valero - Tony
- Marco Antonio Casanova - Javier
- Indhira Serrano - Dra. Martínez
- Carlos Omaña - Comisario Manrique
- José Mantilla - Billy
- Luis Carreño - Jairo
- Lolymar Sánchez - Iris
- Luisa Tovar - Aura Marina
- Francisco Guinot - Paco
- Gabriela Vergara - Eugenia Rangel
- Carlota Sosa - Mercedes
- Yanis Chimaras - Nicolás Santacruz
- Anabell Rivero - Tatiana

== Versions ==
- Amor Cautivo: Mexican telenovela produced by TV Azteca starring Marimar Vega and Arap Bethke as the protagonists.
