= La rebelión (TV series) =

Mexican TV series

- Genre: Thriller
- Written by: Adriana Pelusi
- Directed by: Iñaki Peñafiel; Chava Cartas
- Starring: Aracely Arámbula; Daniela Vega; Ana Serradilla; Adriana Paz
- Composers: Edy Lan; Allison Cantor; Lucas Cantor Santiago
- Country of origin: Mexico
- Original language: Spanish
- No. of seasons: 1
- No. of episodes: 6

Production
- Executive producers: Aaron Ashford; Mario Almeida; Paul Presburger; Gabriela Valentan
- Editor: Ares Botanch
- Production company: Elefantec Global

Original release
- Network: Vix+
- Release: 17 November – 15 December 2022

La rebelión (transl. The rebellion) is a Mexican thriller streaming television series written by Adriana Pelusi, and is produced by Elefantec Global. The series stars Aracely Arámbula, Daniela Vega, Ana Serradilla and Adriana Paz.

It premiered on Vix+ on 17 November 2022.

== Premise ==
Four women decide to leave their homes unexpectedly without telling anyone their whereabouts, to rebel against their marriages and their lives as housewives that did not turn out as they thought. However, in addition to the trip, a murder will bring their lives together.

== Cast ==
=== Main ===
- Aracely Arámbula as Mónica
  - Macarena García as Young Mónica
- Daniela Vega as Jana
  - Macarena Oz as Young Jana
- Ana Serradilla as Alejandra
- Adriana Paz as Ivonne
- Alejandro de la Madrid as Mauricio
- Blanca Guerra
- Dalexa Meneses as Regina
- Ricardo Kleinbaum
- Manuel Villegas as Diego

=== Recurring and guest stars ===
- Luis Arrieta as Roberto
- Arap Bethke
- Mariana Rendón
- Clementina Guadarrama
- Matilde Castañeda as Tatiana
- Erik Guecha
- Sergio Bonilla

== Production ==
In August 2021, the series was announced as La rebelión de las esposas, being one of the titles to be produced by Pantaya and Elefantec Global. On 7 January 2022, filming of the series began in Mexico City, with the title being changed to simply La rebelión. On 14 January 2022, Aracely Arámbula, Daniela Vega, Ana Serradilla and Adriana Paz were cast in the lead roles. On 29 October 2022, it was announced that the series would premiere on Vix+, following TelevisaUnivision's acquisition of Pantaya a month prior. On 10 November 2022, Vix released an official trailer for the series.

== Episodes ==
No.	Title	Original release date
1	"Lejos de casa"	17 November 2022
2	"Planes de escape"	17 November 2022
3	"Dudas"	24 November 2022
4	"Secreto descubierto"	1 December 2022
5	"Crisis"	8 December 2022
6	"Más cerca"	15 December 2022
