= Campeones =

Campeones may refer to:

- Campeones de la vida, Argentine telenovela
- Campeones Cup, North American soccer tournament
- Campeones - Oliver Y Benji, long-running Japanese manga series
- Campeones de la vida (Mexican TV series), Mexican telenovela
- Campeones, 2018 Spanish comedy-drama film directed by Javier Fesser
- Campeones del 36, multi-use stadium in Sullana, Peru
- Campeones, official film of the 1978 FIFA World Cup
