= Sergio Tovar Velarde =

Mexican film director

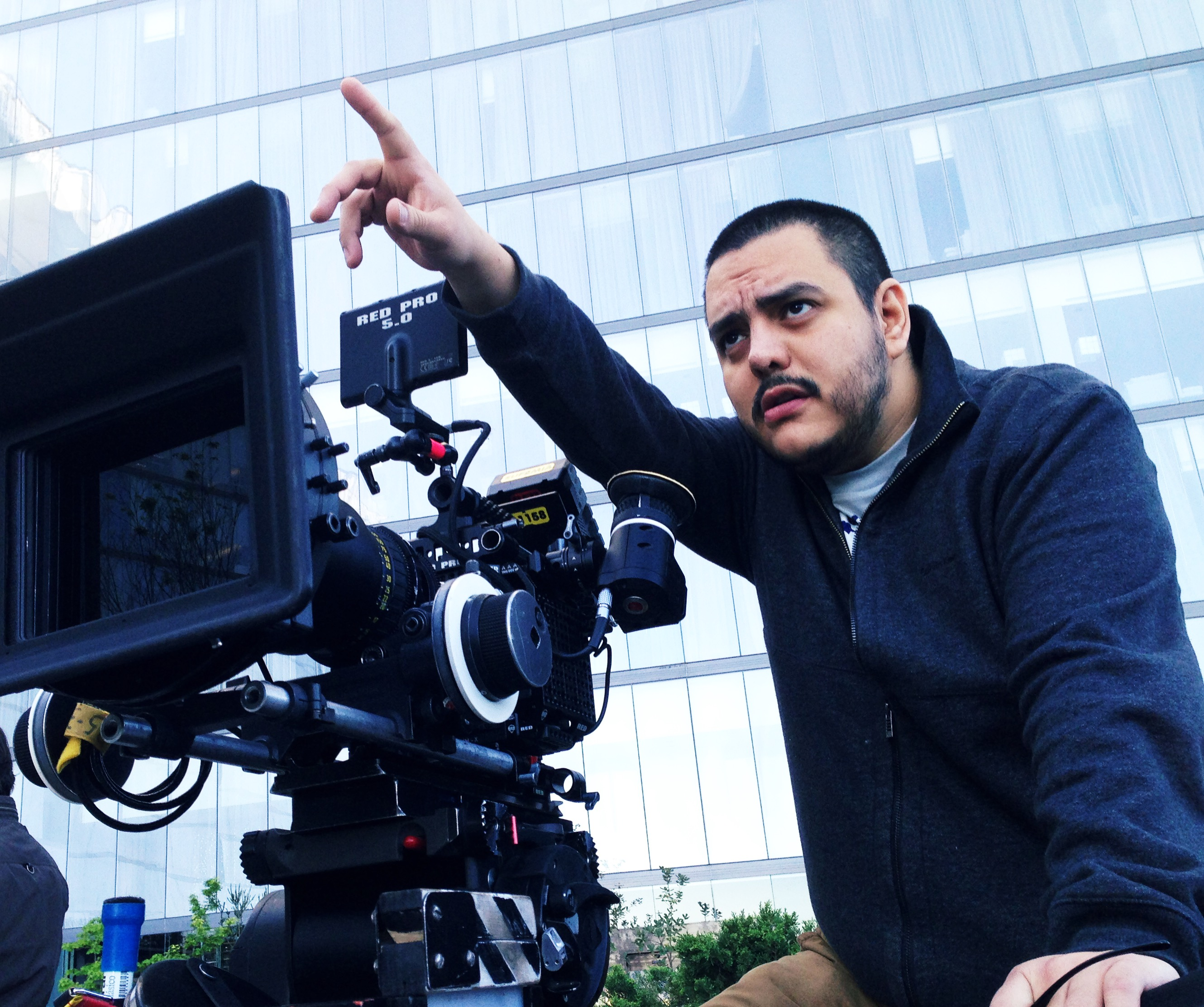
- Sergio Tovar Velarde (2015)
- Born: 31 December 1982 (age 43); Tepic, Nayarit, Mexico
- Occupations: Director, screenwriter
- Years active: 2000–present

Sergio Tovar Velarde (born 31 December 1982) is a Mexican film director. He directed the feature film Mi último día (aka Aurora Boreal) which was premiered at the San Sebastián International Film Festival and was released commercially in theaters in summer of 2009.

He is one of the filmmakers of The Misfits, alongside Javier Colinas, Marco Polo Constandse and Jorge Ramírez Suárez.

== Early life ==
Tovar was born in Tepic, Nayarit, Mexico. He studied communications at Ibero-American University in Mexico City and film theory at Centro de Capacitación Cinematográfica. He studied directing with well-known Polish film director Ludwik Margules.

In 2009, became FONCA's scholar. In 2009, 2006 and 2002 was FECAN's academic.

== Career ==
Despite his early efforts for direct amateur short films, his first professional short film was not made until 1999: Carolina. In June, 2002; work besides Roberto Cobo in KCL, Doce y Cuarto and the film premiere became the last tribute for the actor.

Tovar has been directing short films in France, Canada, Cuba and Mexico; being selected and nominated on 70 film festivals. In 2008, his short film Edén became part of the Best of International Award-winning films in Cannes Short Film.

In 2011, Tovar direct The Misfits, a film composed of 4 contributions from different filmmakers. His last film is Four Moons

== Filmography ==
Extracted from IMDb

=== Feature films ===
2014 - Four Moons (México)
2011 - The Misfits (Los inadaptados) (Chat segment) (México)
2007 - My Last Day Aka Aurora Boreal (México)

=== Short films ===
2012 - Papi Florida (Cuba)
2011 - Jet Lag (Mexico)
2011 - Infinito (Mexico)
2010 - La femme qui pleure (Canada)
2008 - L'esprit hanté (Canada)
2007 - Edén (Mexico)
2006 - El joven Telarañas (Mexico)
2006 - El gusano (Mexico)
2005 - La voz de las cigarras (Mexico)
2003 - KCL, doce y cuarto (Mexico)
2001 - La danza de las salamandras (Mexico)
2000 - Carolina (Mexico)

== Awards ==
Biarritz International Festival of Latin America Cinema

Year	Category	Film	Result	Notes
2007	Golden Sun	Aurora Boreal	Nominated	

Cancún International Film Festival

Year	Category	Film	Result	Notes
2007	Best Mexican Short Film	Edén	Won	

Guadalajara International Film Festival

Year	Category	Film	Result	Notes
2011	Audience Award	Los Inadaptados	Won	
2011	Mayahuel Award – Best Mexican Film	Los Inadaptados	Nominated	
2008	Mayahuel Award – Best Mexican Film	Aurora Boreal	Nominated	
2007	Mayahuel Award – Best Mexican Short Film	Edén	Nominated	

Guanajuato International Film Festival

Year	Category	Film	Result	Notes
2012	Midnight Madness	Jet lag	Nominated	
2011	Midnight Madness	Infinito	Nominated	
2010	Best Mexican Short Film	La femme qui pleure	Nominated	
2008	First Mexican Feature Film	Aurora Boreal	Nominated	
2007	Best Mexican Short Film	Edén	Won	

Habana International Film Festival

Year	Category	Film	Result	Notes
2012	Coral Award – Best Short Film	Papi Florida	Nominated	

Huelva Latin American Film Festival

Year	Category	Film	Result	Notes
2005	Golden Colon – Best Short Film	La voz de las cigarras	Nominated	

Kinoki Film Festival

Year	Category	Film	Result	Notes
2007	Best Short Film	Edén	Nominated	
2007	Best Original Music	Edén	Won	
2007	Audience Award	El joven telarañas	Won	

Mexican Cinema Journalists

Year	Category	Film	Result	Notes
2007	Silver Goddess – Best Short Film	Edén	Nominated	
2006	Silver Goddess – Best Short Film	La voz de las cigarras	Won	

Morelia International Film Festival

Year	Category	Film	Result	Notes
2011	Best Mexican Short Film	Jet lag	Nominated	
2008	Best Mexican Short Film	Edén	Nominated	
2007	Best Mexican Short Film	El gusano	Nominated	

New York Short Film Festival

Year	Category	Film	Result	Notes
2006	Integral Realization	La voz de las cigarras	Won	

Pantalla de Cristal Film Festival

Year	Category	Film	Result	Notes
2007	Best Film	Edén	Nominated	
2007	Best Director	Edén	Nominated	
2007	Best Editing	Edén	Won	
2007	Best Photography	Edén	Won	
2007	Best Script	Edén	Nominated	
2007	Best Photography	El joven telarañas	Nominated	
2007	Best Editing	El joven telarañas	Nominated	
2007	Best Art Direction	El joven telarañas	Nominated	

San Sebastian International Film Festival

Year	Category	Film	Result	Notes
2007	Horizons Award	Aurora Boreal	Nominated	

Short Shorts Film Festival México

Year	Category	Film	Result	Notes
2012	Best Mexican Short Film	Jet lag	Nominated	
2010	Best Mexican Short Film	La femme qui pleure	Nominated	
2008	Best Mexican Short Film	Edén	Won	
2007	Best Mexican Short Film	El gusano	Nominated	
2007	Best Mexican Short Film	El joven telarañas	Nominated	

Toulouse Latin America Film Festival

Year	Category	Film	Result	Notes
2008	Best Film	Aurora Boreal	Nominated	

WorldFest-Houston International Film Festival

Year	Category	Film	Result	Notes
2006	Silver Award – Best Directing	La voz de las cigarras	Won	

== Trivia ==
- In 2002, he and the producer Edgar Barrón founded Atko Films in Mexico City, as a film production company.
- In 2010, Tovar was included on Top Ten decade Nayarit people list.
