= Marimar =

Marimar can mean:

- Marimar (Mexican TV series), a 1994 Mexican telenovela, starring Thalía, originally broadcast in 1994 on Televisa
- MariMar (2007 TV series), the first Philippine remake of the Mexican telenovela
- MariMar (2015 TV series), the second Philippine remake of the Mexican telenovela
- Metel El Amar, a 2016 Lebanese remake of the original Mexican telenovela
- Marimar Vega, a Mexican actress.
