= Aislinn Derbez =

Mexican actress

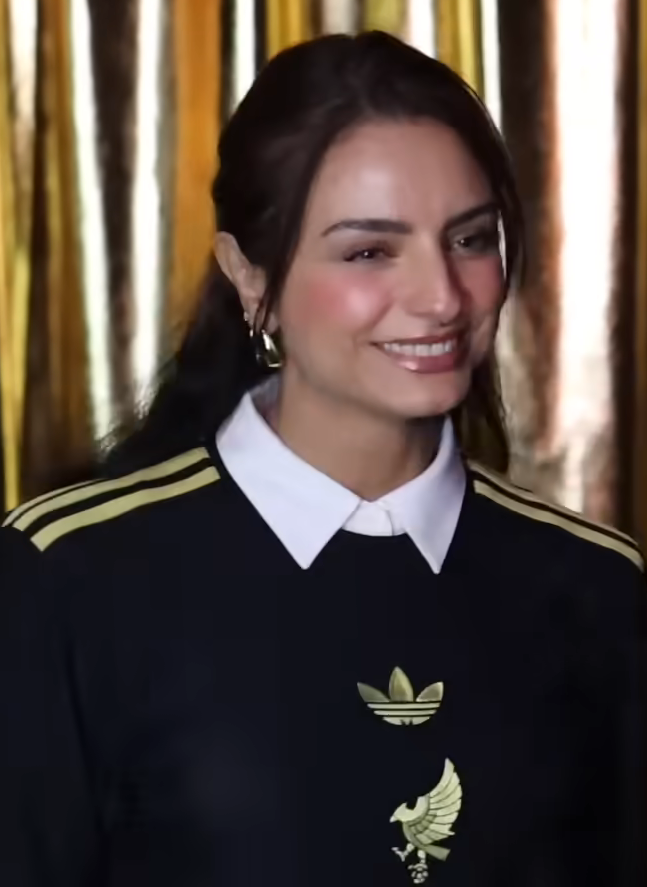
- Derbez in 2025
- Born: Aislinn González Michel; 18 March 1986 (age 40); Mexico City, Mexico
- Occupations: Actress, model
- Years active: 1995–present
- Spouse: Mauricio Ochmann (m. 2016; div. 2020)
- Children: 1
- Parents: Eugenio Derbez (father); Gabriela Michel (mother)
- Relatives: Silvia Derbez (grandmother); Vadhir Derbez (half-brother); José Eduardo Derbez (half-brother); Alessandra Rosaldo (step-mother); Aitana Derbez (half-sister)

Aislinn González Michel (born 18 March 1986), better known as Aislinn Derbez, is a Mexican actress.

== Early life and career ==
Aislinn González Michel is the daughter of actors Eugenio Derbez and Gabriela Michel, who were married from 1986 to 1987. Derbez began her career as a model at age 15. She studied visual arts at the School of Visual Arts and acting at the Actors Studio, both in New York City.

=== Modeling ===
She has been on the cover page of several magazines.

== Personal life ==
Actors Vadhir Derbez and José Eduardo Derbez are her paternal half-brothers. She has one more half-sister on her father's side, Aitana (born in 2014), from her father's marriage to Alessandra Rosaldo. On her mother's side, she has two sisters. Her paternal grandmother is the actress Silvia Derbez.

Derbez started dating Mauricio Ochmann after filming A La Mala in 2014; the couple married in 2016. On 27 February 2018 she gave birth to their daughter, named Kailani Ochmann. The couple split and divorced in 2020.

== Filmography ==
=== Films ===
Year	Title	Role	Notes
2008	Served Cold	Mercedes	Short film
2010	El atentado	Telésfora	
2010	Te presento a Laura	Karla	
2012	El cielo en tu mirada	Abril Lorenzana	
2012	Abolición de la propiedad	Norma	
2013	Sobre ella	Pia	
2013	Little Baby Jesús	Penélope	
2013	No se aceptan devoluciones	Herself	Dedicatee
2014	Tierra de sangre	Magdalena	
2014	Yerbamala	Elena	
2015	A la mala	Maria Laura "Mala" Medina	
2015	Estar o no estar	Nastenka	Nominated – Diosa de Plata for Best Actress
2016	Compadres	María	Controversy for kiss scene
2016	Macho	Viviana	
2016	Qué pena tu vida	Andrea	
2017	Win It All	Eva	
2017	Hazlo Como Hombre	Nati	
2019	Miss Bala	Isabel	
2021	The House of Flowers: The Movie	Elena de la Mora	
2021	Back to the Outback	Legs (voice)	
2022	Don't Blame Karma!	Sara	Main role

=== Television ===
Year	Title	Role	Notes
2009	Ellas son, la alegría del hogar	Vanessa	
2010	Los Minondo	Casilda	
2010	Niñas mal	Brenda	6 episodes
2010	Mujeres asesinas	Marta	"Marta, manipuladora" (Season 3, Episode 10)
2012	Los héroes del norte	Natasha	6 episodes
2013	La promesa	Frida Aguilera	"Tres bellas jovencitas, en tres diferentes lugares" (Season 1, Episode 1)
2013	Gossip Girl: Acapulco	Giovanna	4 episodes
2015	Nuestra Belleza Latina 2015	Herself	Celebrity guest (4th Gala)
2016–2017	Easy	Gabi	Episodes: "Controlada" y "Segundo empleo"
2018–2020	La casa de las Flores	Elena de la Mora	Main role
2019	Seis Manos	Isabela (voice)	Main role
