= Juan José Zerboni =

Mexican actor (1953–2025)

Juan José Zerboni (1953 – 13 December 2025) was a Mexican actor.

== Life and career ==
Throughout his career, Zerboni acted in a number of television series, including La Hora Marcada (2023) and Dra. Lucía, un don extraordinario (2023).

Zerboni died on 13 December 2025, at the age of 72.
