= Four Moons =

- Directed by: Sergio Tovar Velarde
- Written by: Sergio Tovar Velarde
- Produced by: Edgar Barrón
- Starring: Antonio Velázquez; Alejandro de la Madrid; César Ramos; Gustavo Egelhaaf; Alonso Echánove; Alejandro Belmonte; Karina Gidi; Juan Manuel Bernal
- Cinematography: Yannick Nolin
- Release dates: 25 March 2014 (Guadalajara); 12 February 2015
- Country: Mexico
- Language: Spanish

Four Moons (Spanish: Cuatro lunas) is a 2014 Mexican drama directed by Sergio Tovar Velarde. It stars Antonio Velázquez, Alejandro de la Madrid, César Ramos, Gustavo Egelhaaf, Alonso Echánove, Alejandro Belmonte, Karina Gidi and Juan Manuel Bernal. It was one of fourteen films shortlisted by Mexico to be their submission for the Academy Award for Best Foreign Language Film at the 88th Academy Awards, but it lost out to 600 Miles. Alonso Echánove was nominated for an Ariel Award for Best Supporting Actor in 2015 for his role in Cuatro Lunas.

== Plot ==
Four interwoven and complex stories of love and acceptance (of self and others): a boy who has secretly been attracted to his male cousin through life; two college students starting a secret relationship; a committed couple severely tested by the arrival of another man; and an old married man dazzled by a young married male who hustles to get back to his own family.

== Cast ==
- Antonio Velázquez as Hugo
- Alejandro de la Madrid as Andrés
- César Ramos as Fito
- Gustavo Egelhaaf as Leo
- Alonso Echánove as Joaquín
- Alejandro Belmonte as Gilberto
- Karina Gidi as Laura
- Gabriel Santoyo as Mauricio
- Sebastián Rivera as Oliver
- Juan Manuel Bernal as Héctor
- Marta Aura as Petra
- Mónica Dionne as Aurora
- Astrid Hadad as Alfonsina
- Hugo Catalán as Sebastián
- Jorge Luis Moreno as Enrique
- Luis Arrieta as Alfredo
- Laura de Ita as Amanda
- Joaquín Rodríguez as Bruno
- Marisol Centeno as Mariana
- Alejandra Ley as Tania
- Héctor Arredondo as the priest
- Ricardo Polanco as Rolando
- Renato Bartilotti as Doctor
- Oscar Olivares as Alejandro
- Martín Barba as Pepe
