= Being or Not Being =

- Mexican theatrical release poster
- Estar o No Estar
- Directed by: Marcelo González
- Screenplay by: Marcelo González
- Produced by: Eduardo J. Villarreal
- Starring: Flavio Medina; Aislinn Derbez; Angélica Aragón; Tiaré Scanda; Patricia Reyes Spíndola
- Cinematography: Jerónimo Rodríguez Garcia
- Edited by: Roberto Bolado
- Music by: Osvaldo Montes
- Release dates: March 9, 2015 (Guadalajara International Film Festival); September 9, 2016
- Running time: 100 minutes
- Country: Mexico
- Language: Spanish

Being or Not Being (Spanish: Estar o No Estar) is a 2015 Mexican drama film, directed by Marcelo González. The film stars Flavio Medina and Aislinn Derbez and was filmed in Tlacotalpan, Veracruz and Xalapa in the Mexican state of Veracruz. In the film, Augusto (Medina) is a forty-six years old single man who relocates to another city following his mother's death. He meets Nástenska (Derbez) and falls in love with her. The film is González first feature film and received six nominations for the 2017 Diosas de Plata awards winning for Best Supporting Actress (Tiaré Scanda) and Best Cinematography (Jerónimo Rodríguez García).

== Plot ==
Augusto (Flavio Medina) is a forty-six year-old single man who decided to move from his hometown Xalapa to Tlacotalpan after his mother's death. He rents a room in a pension and meets a neighbor named Ludivina (Tiaré Scanda) who becomes his friend. When he is alone in the room, his mother's ghost (Patricia Reyes Spíndola) appears on his mirror and continually scolds him.

He meets Nástenska (Aislinn Derbez), a waitress in a local restaurant run by her godmother (Angélica Aragón), and becomes infatuated with her. They become friends and she invites him to watch her playing Roxanne in the play Cyrano of Bergerac at a local theater in Veracruz; the same night she celebrates her birthday and after a dinner party, they walk on a beach and end up making love.

The following day, Mauricio (Gonzalo García Vivanco), Nástenska's boyfriend, returns to the city after spending one year on a boat and she decides to elope with him. Augusto falls into depression after her departure and Ludivina takes advantage to comfort him and they have sex. The morning after Augusto tells Ludivina that he can not marry her, and she responds that she does not want to marry and reveals her past as a prostitute.

A few months later Nástenska returns to Tlacotalpan and finds Augusto working at the restaurant where she used to work and he discovers that she is pregnant, they have a conversation and she confirms her return to Spain with Mauricio despite not having the happy life she always wanted. Ludivina goes away for the weekend and upon returning she discovers Augusto's dead body in his room; Augusto died from eating expired canned food. Augusto's ghost is seen happy while his ashes are poured into the sea by Nástenska.

== Cast ==
- Flavio Medina as Augusto
- Aislinn Derbez as Nástenska
- Tiaré Scanda as Ludivina
- Angélica Aragón as Matrushka
- Patricia Reyes Spíndola as Verónica
- Gonzalo García Vivanco as Mauricio
- Ruben González Garza as Don Manuel
- José Antonio Barón as Don Memo
- Iliana de la Garza as Margarita
- Horacio Castelo as Cyrano de Bergerac
- Imelda Castro as Lola
- Luis Monterrubio as Jorge
- Mary Paz Mata as Nana

== Awards and nominations ==
=== Diosas de Plata ===
The Diosas de Platas ("Silver Goddesses") are awarded annually by the Film Mexican Journalists Association (Asociación de Periodistas Cinematográficos de México) (PECIME). Estar o No Estar received six nominations.

Year	Nominee / work	Award	Result
2017	Marcelo González	Best First Feature Film	Nominated
2017	Flavio Medina	Best Actor	Nominated
2017	Aislinn Derbez	Best Actress	Nominated
2017	Tiaré Scanda	Best Supporting Actress	Won
2017	Patricia Reyes Spíndola	Best Actress in a Minor Role	Nominated
2017	Jeronimo Rodriguez Garcia	Best Cinematography	Won
