= The Toast (film) =

- Theatrical release poster
- Directed by: Shai Agosin
- Written by: Roberto Brodsky
- Produced by: Bruno Bettati
- Starring: Ana Serradilla; Francisco Melo; Pepe Soriano
- Cinematography: Ignacio Prieto
- Edited by: Carlos Puente
- Music by: Esteban Agosín
- Production companies: Agosin Films; Goliat Films
- Release dates: October 21, 2007 (FICVIÑA); August 7, 2008 (Chile)
- Running time: 100 minutes
- Countries: Chile; Mexico
- Language: Spanish
- Budget: $1.5 million

The Toast (Spanish: El brindis) is a 2007 Chilean-Mexican romantic comedy-drama film directed by Shai Agosin (in his directorial debut) and written by Roberto Brodsky. Starring Ana Serradilla, Francisco Melo and Pepe Soriano. It competed for the Colón de Oro at the 33rd Huelva Ibero-American Film Festival.

== Synopsis ==
Invited by her father, whom she has hardly seen in her life, Emilia, a Mexican photographer, travels to Chile full of insecurities and fears. There she will meet her family who will receive her with as much affection as hypocrisy. Determined to conquer her and make her accept him despite her mistakes, Isidoro will show her his world where she will meet David, a man who is going through a deep crisis and with whom she will become more confused in her search.

== Cast ==
The actors participating in this film are:

- Pepe Soriano as Isidoro
- Ana Serradilla as Emilia
- Francisco Melo as David
- Pablo Krögh as Carlos
- Jenny Cavallo as Nicole
- Maricarmen Arrigorriaga as Sofía
- Alejandro Trejo as Rubén
- Teresita Reyes as Sandra
- Eduardo Burlé as Lion
- Carmen Disa Gutiérrez as Esther
- Vanessa Miller as Lia
- Andrés Velasco as Gabriel
- Radomiro Spotorno as Alex
- Matías Pimstein as Alan
- María José Shonhaut as Claudia
- Octavio Cornejo as Yaniv
- Sandra Torres as Galit

== Production ==
Principal photography began on February 21, 2007 on location in Viña del Mar and Santiago and ended in late April of the same year in Mexico City.

== Release ==
The Toast had its world premiere on October 21, 2007 at the 19th Viña del Mar International Film Festival, then it was screened in November of the same year at the 33rd Huelva Ibero-American Film Festival where it competed for the Colón de Oro. It was released commercially on August 7, 2008 in Chilean theaters.

== Accolades ==
Year	Award / Festival	Category	Recipient	Result	Ref.
2007	Huelva Ibero-American Film Festival	Colón de Oro	The Toast	Nominated	
2008	Tulipanes Latino Art & Film Festival	Best Feature	The Toast	Won	
2008	Ourense International Film Festival	Audience Award	The Toast	Won	
2008	San Diego Latin Film Festival	Audience Award	The Toast	Won	
