= Profe infiltrado =

- Genre: Sitcom
- Based on: Fizruk by Anton Shchukin
- Starring: Memo Villegas; Natalia Téllez; Diana Carreiro; Norma Angélica; Marimar Vega; Sebastián Zurita; Alejandro Cuétara; Karla Farfán
- Composer: Amado López
- Country of origin: Mexico
- Original language: Spanish
- No. of seasons: 2
- No. of episodes: 16

Production
- Executive producers: Sergio Agüero; Jaime Dávila; Diana Mejia-Jones; Jaime Muñoz de Baena
- Editor: J. Martín Téllez Andrade
- Production company: Campanario Entertainment

Original release
- Network: Vix
- Release: 7 June 2024 – 3 July 2025

Profe infiltrado is a Mexican television sitcom based on the 2014 Russian television series Fizruk. The series stars Memo Villegas, Natalia Téllez, Diana Carreiro, Norma Angélica, Marimar Vega, Sebastián Zurita and Alejandro Cuétara. It premiered on Vix on 7 June 2024. The second season was released on 3 July 2025.

== Cast ==
=== Main ===
- Memo Villegas as Julián
- Natalia Téllez as Sofía
- Diana Carreiro as Paola
- Norma Angélica as Damaris
- Marimar Vega as Beatriz (season 1)
- Sebastián Zurita as Maldonado
- Alejandro Cuétara as Don Rafael
- Karla Farfán as Citlali (season 2)

=== Recurring and guest stars ===
- Víctor Hernández as Melvin
- Alex Lago as Cheche
- Sebastián Poza as Santi
- Jessica Vite as Margarita
- Mario Monroy as Officer Delgado
- Manuel Calderón as Officer Rodríguez
- Hernán del Riego as Archundia
- Claudia Frías as Paty
- Ariane Pellicer as Katy
- Antón Araiza as Toño
- Alejandro Pelayo as Beto
- Kaleb Oseguera as Huicho
- Marduk Chimalli as Professor Manuel
- Julio Casado as Vicente

== Episodes ==
Season	Episodes	Originally released
1	8	7 June 2024
2	8	3 July 2025

=== Season 1 (2024) ===
No. overall	No. in season	Title	Directed by	Written by	Original release date
1	1	"Un perro con muchas correas"	Miguel Necoechea	Jaime Muñoz de Baena	7 June 2024
2	2	"El Matapollos"	Alfonso Pineda Ulloa	Andreína Borges & Fernando Rasé	7 June 2024
3	3	"La rubia misteriosa"	Miguel Necoechea	Jaime Muñoz de Baena	7 June 2024
4	4	"The Wire"	Miguel Necoechea	Andreína Borges	7 June 2024
5	5	"El depopurrí"	Alfonso Pineda Ulloa	Fernando Rasé	7 June 2024
6	6	"El plan de Don Rafa"	Alfonso Pineda Ulloa	Andreína Borges	7 June 2024
7	7	"Reclusorio"	Miguel Necoechea	Fernando Rasé	7 June 2024
8	8	"Media naranja"	Alfonso Pineda Ulloa	Jaime Muñoz de Baena	7 June 2024

=== Season 2 (2025) ===
No. overall	No. in season	Title	Directed by	Written by	Original release date
9	1	"El rostro"	Miguel Necoechea	Jaime Muñoz de Baena	3 July 2025
10	2	"El tesoro de Beatriz"	Unknown	Unknown	3 July 2025
11	3	"La pista"	Unknown	Unknown	3 July 2025
12	4	"El Matatoños"	Unknown	Unknown	3 July 2025
13	5	"En esteroides"	Unknown	Unknown	3 July 2025
14	6	"Chupa Rico"	Unknown	Unknown	3 July 2025
15	7	"Once al día"	Unknown	Unknown	3 July 2025
16	8	"Fuera Maldonado"	Unknown	Unknown	3 July 2025

== Production ==
The series was announced on 22 June 2023, under the working title El guardaespaldas. The series premiered on 7 June 2024. The second season premiered on 3 July 2025.

== Awards and nominations ==
Year	Award	Category	Nominated	Result	Ref
2024	Produ Awards	Best Comedy Series	Profe infiltrado	Nominated	
2024	Produ Awards	Best Lead Actor - Comedy Series and Miniseries	Memo Villegas	Nominated	
2024	Produ Awards	Best Supporting Actress - Comedy Series and Miniseries	Marimar Vega	Won	
2024	Produ Awards	Best Supporting Actress - Comedy Series and Miniseries	Natalia Téllez	Nominated	
2025	Produ Awards	Best Sitcom	Profe infiltrado	Nominated	
