= Roberto Brodsky =

Chilean novelist and screenwriter

Roberto Brodsky Baudet (born 1957, Santiago, Chile) is a Chilean novelist and screenwriter. He has written six novels, several film and theater scripts, and over 250 articles published in national newspapers and magazines. Baudet was awarded the 2007 Jaén Prize for Best Novel and the 2009 Martin Nuez Award, both for his 2008 novel Bosque Quemado (Burnt Forest). He lives in New York City with his wife and family. He is adjunct professor at the Center for Latin American Studies in Georgetown University.

== Personal life ==
Roberto Brodsky lives with his wife and children, Pascual, Sam, and Sara. He is Jewish.

== Novels and Non-Fiction ==
- 2025 - Lobos (Random House)
- 2022 - Adios a Bolaño (Rialta Ediciones)
- 2020- La casa que falta (Peter Lang)
- 2012 - Veneno (Random House)
- 2008 – Bosque quemado (Burnt Forest), Premio Jaén - España
- 2004 – El arte de callar (The Art of Silence)
- 2001 – Los últimos días de la historia (The Last Days of History)
- 1999 – El peor de los héroes (The Worst of Heroes)

== Short stories ==
- "El crimen de escribir" (The Crime of Writing)
- "Con Pasión" (With passion)

== Filmography - scripts ==
- 2010 – Mi vida con Carlos (My Life with Carlos) - documentary
- 2007 – The Toast
- 2005 – Divina Day
- 2004 – Machuca, co-script writer

== Theater - scripts ==
- 1986 – La pieza que falta (The Missing Piece), co-author
- 1983 – Homenaje al surrealismo (Hommage to Surrealism)
- 1980 – Lily, yo te quiero (Lily, I love you), co-author
