= Drenaje profundo =

- Promotional Poster
- Also known as: Deep Drain
- Created by: Roberto González; Benjamín Salinas
- Developed by: TV Azteca
- Directed by: Carlos Guerra; Silvana Zuanetti
- Starring: Ana Serradilla; Rodrigo Murray
- Theme music composer: Pier Bover, Gerardo Pellicer
- Country of origin: Mexico
- Original language: Spanish
- No. of episodes: 20

Production
- Producers: Roberto Gonzalez; Benjamin Salinas
- Production location: Mexico City
- Camera setup: Multi-camera
- Running time: 42 minutes

Original release
- Network: Azteca Trece
- Release: 2010 – 2011

Related
- Al Caer la Noche (At the Stroke of the night)

Drenaje Profundo is a primetime television series produced by TV Azteca. It stars Ana Serradilla, Rodrigo Murray, Juan Pablo Medina and Elizabeth Cervantes. The series began in October 2010.

== Plot ==
After an accident in the Mexico City subway system, the detective Ulises Elizalde (Juan Pablo Medina) is sent to investigate. Ulises follows after a man who punches him on the subway tracks and he accidentally falls into the sewers. Underground he is rescued by Yamel (Ana Serradilla) a young woman who's hiding an enormous secret. It's later revealed that Yamel, and the other people living in the sewer drain have been injected with an eternal youth serum that was developed by a scientist named Igor, under the orders of Milosz, an evil scientist from the late sixties. That's the reason why Yamel, who in actuality is 65 years old, has the appearance of a 25-year-old woman.

== Cast ==
Cast	Character	Description
Ana Serradilla	Yamel	A woman who lives in the drain.
Rodrigo Murray	Eric	The sheriff of the Federal Police
Juan Pablo Medina	Ulises	He's an honest and trustworthy police, devoted to his work and sometimes a little rebellious
Elizabeth Cervantes	Rita	She's a detective of the Federal Police and Ulises' sidekick. She is a single mother who lives with her beloved daughter Jimena.
Arleta Herziorzka	Angela	Milosz's assistant.
Cecilia Pineiro	Celia	A TV Azteca Reporter
Enrique Novi	Igor	The scientist who developed the Eternal Youth elixir. He's the father of Ulises.
Fernando Becerril	Milosz	An evil scientist who kidnapped thousands of young men in the sixties to experiment with them, he also is the father-in-law of Ulises.
German Valdes	Diego	The youngest of the inhabitants of the drain, once ruined an escape opportunity for their mates.
Hugo Albores	Hector	
Julia Urbini	Renata	A girl who lives in the drain.
Luis Miguel Lombana	Jacobo	
Manuel Foyo	El Rolas	A tech-savvy police agent, he helps Ulises and Rita many times in all things concerning to technology.
Paty Garza	Lorena	Ulises' girlfriend and Milosz daughter

== International broadcast ==
- Guatemala Azteca Guatemala
- USA Azteca America
- Malaysia Astro Bella
