= Dra. Lucía, un don extraordinario =

- Genre: Drama
- Created by: Adrián Ortega
- Directed by: Carlos Carrera; Raúl Caballero; José Luis García Agraz; Luigi Reyes
- Starring: Marimar Vega; Kuno Becker; Ana Layevska; Mauricio Islas; Cristián de la Fuente; Isabel Burr; Carlos Ferro
- Country of origin: Mexico
- Original language: Spanish
- No. of seasons: 3
- No. of episodes: 129

Production
- Executive producer: Martín Garza Cisneros
- Producers: Miriam Barrios; Román Villaseñor Cristóbal
- Cinematography: Ricardo Garfias; Josué Eber Morales; Alberto Ulloa; Xavier Ibarrola
- Editors: Mónica Rodríguez C.; Fernando Rodríguez Carrillo; Alejandra Espinoza Guzmán; Víctor Morales
- Production company: TV Azteca

Original release
- Network: Azteca Uno
- Release: 2 October 2023 – 27 December 2024
- Network: Azteca 7
- Release: 28 September 2026 – present

Dra. Lucía, un don extraordinario is a Mexican television series produced by TV Azteca. Marimar Vega stars as the titular character, alongside Kuno Becker, Ana Layevska and Mauricio Islas. It premiered on Azteca Uno on 2 October 2023. In January 2024, the series was renewed for a second season that premiered on 21 October 2024. In January 2025, the series was renewed for a third season that premiered on Azteca 7 on 28 September 2026.

== Cast ==
=== Main ===
- Marimar Vega as Dr. Lucía Castillo
- Kuno Becker as Dr. Enrique Jiménez (season 1)
- Ana Layevska as Dr. Mariana Esquivel
- Mauricio Islas as Carlos Reséndiz (seasons 1–2)
- Paola Flores as Chabe (seasons 1-2)
- José Carlos Femat as Omar Tapia
- Amorita Rasgado as Dr. Sagrario (seasons 1–2)
- Daniel García as Dr. Daniel Mora
- Norma Reyna as Manuela
- Cristián de la Fuente as Dr. Emiliano Montero de la Vega (seasons 1-2)
- Eugenio Elizondo as Dr. Oscar Gaytán (season 2)
- Luisa Rubino as Dr. Karina Montiel (season 2–present)
- Isabel Burr as Dr. Helena Guajardo (season 2)
- Carlos Ferro as Dr. Patricio Quiroz (season 2–present)
- Itatí Cantoral as Dr. Natalia Cervantes (season 3)
- Julia Urbini as Dr. Lucía Espejo (season 3; recurring season 2)
- Andrea Lagunés as Sara Romero (season 3; recurring season 2)
- Cayetano Aramburo as Dr. José Luis Velazco (season 3)
- Ruy Senderos as Camilo (season 3)

=== Recurring and guest stars ===
- Juanpa López Mata as Lorenzo
- Elena Díaz as Sabina
- Ale Tribbianni as Marlene
- Lola Arruti as Sonia
- Juan José Zerboni as Claudio
- Ernesto Rocha as Israel
- Fabián Mejía as Miguel
- Karla Herrera as Ruth
- Gisel Casas as Margarita
- Lilia Mendoza as Micaela
- Daron González as Valentín
- Juan Luis Repetto Jr. as Damián
- Raúl Galeana as Plácido
- Tamara Niño de Rivera as Sofía Salabeth
- Claudio Lafarga as Bruno Barraza

== Production ==
In May 2023, the series was announced at the L.A. Screenings event. On 6 July 2023, Marimar Vega, Kuno Becker, Ana Layevska and Mauricio Islas were cast in main roles. Filming of the series began on 11 August 2023. The series premiered on 2 October 2023. On 23 January 2024, TV Azteca renewed the series for a second season. The second season premiered on 21 October 2024. On 22 January 2025, TV Azteca renewed the series for a third season. The third season premiered on 28 September 2026.

== Episodes ==
Season	Episodes	Originally released		
Season	Episodes	First released	Last released	Network
1	50	2 October 2023	8 December 2023	Azteca Uno
2	50	21 October 2024	27 December 2024	Azteca Uno
3	TBA	28 September 2026	TBA	Azteca 7

=== Season 1 (2023) ===
No.	Title	Written by	Original release date	Mexico viewers (millions)
1	"Un gran cambio"	Raúl Olivares & Caroline Vera	2 October 2023	0.92
2	"El rey picoso"	Raúl Olivares & Denis Languérand	3 October 2023	0.80
3	"Sin familia"	Raúl Olivares & Caroline Vera	4 October 2023	0.89
4	"Que pare el dolor"	Raúl Olivares & Denis Languérand	5 October 2023	0.92
5	"Mejores amigas"	Raúl Olivares & Caroline Vera	6 October 2023	0.82
6	"Las Pacas"	Raúl Olivares & Denis Languérand	9 October 2023	0.76
7	"Todo queda en familia"	Raúl Olivares & Caroline Vera	10 October 2023	0.77
8	"Mayombé"	Raúl Olivares & Denis Languérand	11 October 2023	0.89
9	"A flor de piel"	Raúl Olivares & Caroline Vera	12 October 2023	0.77
10	"Una gota de su propio chocolate"	Raúl Olivares & Denis Languérand	13 October 2023	0.75
11	"Té del amor"	Raúl Olivares & Caroline Vera	16 October 2023	0.85
12	"Por la boca muere el pez"	Raúl Olivares & Denis Languérand	17 October 2023	0.83
13	"Juego de niños"	Raúl Olivares & Caroline Vera	18 October 2023	0.98
14	"El agua fluye"	Raúl Olivares & Denis Languérand	19 October 2023	0.80
15	"Asada"	Raúl Olivares & Caroline Vera	20 October 2023	0.84
16	"Sueño eléctrico"	Raúl Olivares & Denis Languérand	23 October 2023	0.76
17	"Cenizas a las cenizas"	Raúl Olivares & Caroline Vera	24 October 2023	0.78
18	"Nadie sabe, nadie supo"	Raúl Olivares & Denis Languérand	25 October 2023	0.74
19	"Cháchara"	Raúl Olivares & Caroline Vera	26 October 2023	0.89
20	"Eufóricos"	Raúl Olivares & Denis Languérand	27 October 2023	0.74
21	"Importación (Parte 1)"	Raúl Olivares & Caroline Vera	30 October 2023	0.90
22	"Importación (Parte 2)"	Raúl Olivares & Caroline Vera	31 October 2023	0.78
23	"El coleccionista"	Raúl Olivares & Caroline Vera	1 November 2023	0.77
24	"Algunos cerebros"	Raúl Olivares & Caroline Vera	2 November 2023	0.88
25	"Seres humanos"	Raúl Olivares & Caroline Vera	3 November 2023	0.92
26	"Blanco y negro"	Raúl Olivares, Caroline Vera & Denis Languérand	6 November 2023	1.10
27	"El mejor actor"	Raúl Olivares, Caroline Vera & Denis Languérand	7 November 2023	1.10
28	"La cruda realidad"	Raúl Olivares, Caroline Vera & Denis Languérand	8 November 2023	0.98
29	"La sangre es primero"	Raúl Olivares, Caroline Vera & Denis Languérand	9 November 2023	1.00
30	"El poder de la mente"	Raúl Olivares, Caroline Vera & Denis Languérand	10 November 2023	0.88
31	"Resiliencia"	Raúl Olivares, Caroline Vera & Denis Languérand	13 November 2023	0.96
32	"Vampiros"	Raúl Olivares, Caroline Vera & Denis Languérand	14 November 2023	0.99
33	"La hora del parásito"	Raúl Olivares, Caroline Vera & Denis Languérand	15 November 2023	1.10
34	"Carniceros"	Raúl Olivares, Caroline Vera & Denis Languérand	16 November 2023	1.10
35	"Disrupción"	Raúl Olivares, Caroline Vera & Denis Languérand	17 November 2023	1.00
36	"En el viaje"	Raúl Olivares, Caroline Vera & Denis Languérand	20 November 2023	1.00
37	"Las pequeñas cosas"	Raúl Olivares, Caroline Vera & Denis Languérand	21 November 2023	0.91
38	"Tierna gladiola"	Raúl Olivares, Caroline Vera & Denis Languérand	22 November 2023	0.88
39	"La enseñanza"	Raúl Olivares, Caroline Vera & Denis Languérand	23 November 2023	1.00
40	"La única oportunidad"	Raúl Olivares, Caroline Vera & Denis Languérand	24 November 2023	0.93
41	"Las apariencias engañan"	Raúl Olivares, Caroline Vera & Denis Languérand	27 November 2023	0.91
42	"Fuego medieval"	Raúl Olivares, Caroline Vera & Denis Languérand	28 November 2023	0.87
43	"La rebelión"	Raúl Olivares, Caroline Vera & Denis Languérand	29 November 2023	0.84
44	"Tres hermanas"	Raúl Olivares, Caroline Vera & Denis Languérand	30 November 2023	0.92
45	"El error"	Raúl Olivares, Caroline Vera & Denis Languérand	1 December 2023	1.00
46	"El amuleto"	Raúl Olivares, Caroline Vera & Denis Languérand	4 December 2023	0.98
47	"Zona del silencio"	Raúl Olivares, Caroline Vera & Denis Languérand	5 December 2023	0.94
48	"Hongos"	Raúl Olivares, Caroline Vera & Denis Languérand	6 December 2023	0.99
49	"Nunca digas nunca"	Raúl Olivares, Caroline Vera & Denis Languérand	7 December 2023	1.10
50	"El futuro es el pasado"	Raúl Olivares, Caroline Vera & Denis Languérand	8 December 2023	1.00

=== Season 2 (2024) ===
No. overall	No. in season	Title	Written by	Original release date	Mexico viewers (millions)
51	1	"Familia es familia"	Raúl Olivares & Caroline Vera	21 October 2024	0.82
52	2	"Algo de fierro viejo"	Raúl Olivares & Denis Languérand	22 October 2024	0.86
53	3	"Por un pelo de gato"	Raúl Olivares & Caroline Vera	23 October 2024	0.86
54	4	"El dolor de la luz"	Raúl Olivares & Denis Languérand	24 October 2024	0.81
55	5	"Vegetales malvados"	Raúl Olivares & Caroline Vera	25 October 2024	0.71
56	6	"Modelo para armar"	Raúl Olivares & Denis Languérand	28 October 2024	N/A
57	7	"Secretos muy secretos"	Raúl Olivares & Caroline Vera	29 October 2024	0.97
58	8	"Perros"	Raúl Olivares & Denis Languérand	30 October 2024	0.74
59	9	"Bonita"	Raúl Olivares & Caroline Vera	31 October 2024	0.67
60	10	"Adiós Forzado"	Raúl Olivares & Denis Languérand	1 November 2024	0.82
61	11	"Control de daños"	Raúl Olivares & Caroline Vera	4 November 2024	0.90
62	12	"Las estrellas"	Raúl Olivares & Denis Languérand	5 November 2024	0.89
63	13	"Razones de peso"	Raúl Olivares & Caroline Vera	6 November 2024	N/A
64	14	"Mala vibra"	Raúl Olivares & Denis Languérand	7 November 2024	0.86
65	15	"Obra negra"	Raúl Olivares & Caroline Vera	8 November 2024	0.92
66	16	"No querer ver"	Raúl Olivares & Denis Languérand	11 November 2024	1.02
67	17	"Viejas heridas"	Raúl Olivares & Caroline Vera	12 November 2024	1.05
68	18	"Más que amigos"	Raúl Olivares & Denis Languérand	13 November 2024	0.87
69	19	"Artrópodo"	Raúl Olivares & Caroline Vera	14 November 2024	0.95
70	20	"Noche de sushi"	Raúl Olivares & Denis Languérand	15 November 2024	0.89
71	21	"¿Dónde está Lucía? (Parte 1)"	Raúl Olivares & Caroline Vera	18 November 2024	1.01
72	22	"¿Dónde está Lucía? (Parte 2)"	Raúl Olivares & Denis Languérand	19 November 2024	0.99
73	23	"Fugitivos"	Raúl Olivares & Caroline Vera	20 November 2024	N/A
74	24	"Esqueletos en el clóset"	Raúl Olivares & Denis Languérand	21 November 2024	1.25
75	25	"Selección natural"	Raúl Olivares & Caroline Vera	22 November 2024	1.05
76	26	"Piratas"	Raúl Olivares & Denis Languérand	25 November 2024	1.00
77	27	"Palomas mensajeras"	Raúl Olivares & Denis Languérand	26 November 2024	0.98
78	28	"Mudanzas"	Raúl Olivares & Denis Languérand	27 November 2024	0.91
79	29	"Tenemos que hablar"	Raúl Olivares & Caroline Vera	28 November 2024	N/A
80	30	"Un hospital en declive"	Raúl Olivares & Denis Languérand	29 November 2024	1.06
81	31	"¿Se quedan o se van?"	Raúl Olivares & Caroline Vera	2 December 2024	N/A
82	32	"Sin Reemplazo"	Raúl Olivares & Denis Languérand	3 December 2024	1.00
83	33	"Grandes preguntas"	Raúl Olivares & Caroline Vera	4 December 2024	0.76
84	34	"Alta presión"	Raúl Olivares & Denis Languérand	5 December 2024	N/A
85	35	"Anexados"	Raúl Olivares & Caroline Vera	6 December 2024	N/A
86	36	"Inexplicable"	Raúl Olivares & Denis Languérand	9 December 2024	N/A
87	37	"No es el fin del mundo"	Raúl Olivares & Caroline Vera	10 December 2024	N/A
88	38	"Arqueología Médica"	Raúl Olivares & Denis Languérand	11 December 2024	N/A
89	39	"Mentiras al desnudo"	Raúl Olivares & Caroline Vera	12 December 2024	N/A
90	40	"Cosas inexplicables"	Raúl Olivares & Denis Languérand	13 December 2024	N/A
91	41	"Fallas de seguridad"	Raúl Olivares, Caroline Vera & Denis Languérand	16 December 2024	N/A
92	42	"Herederos"	Raúl Olivares, Caroline Vera & Denis Languérand	17 December 2024	N/A
93	43	"Ojo por ojo"	Raúl Olivares, Caroline Vera & Denis Languérand	18 December 2024	N/A
94	44	"Malas noticias"	Raúl Olivares, Caroline Vera & Denis Languérand	19 December 2024	N/A
95	45	"Despedidas"	Raúl Olivares, Caroline Vera & Denis Languérand	20 December 2024	N/A
96	46	"Vuelta al origen"	Raúl Olivares, Caroline Vera & Denis Languérand	23 December 2024	N/A
97	47	"La búsquda"	Raúl Olivares, Caroline Vera & Denis Languérand	24 December 2024	N/A
98	48	"Dos Lucías"	Raúl Olivares, Caroline Vera & Denis Languérand	25 December 2024	N/A
99	49	"Pertenencia"	Raúl Olivares, Caroline Vera & Denis Languérand	26 December 2024	N/A
100	50	"Contradecir al destino"	Raúl Olivares, Caroline Vera & Denis Languérand	27 December 2024	N/A

=== Season 3 (2026) ===
No. overall	No. in season	Title	Written by	Original release date	Mexico viewers (millions)
101	1	"Redención"	Raúl Olivares & Denis Languérand	28 September 2026	1.17
102	2	"Antiguas visiones"	Raúl Olivares & Caroline Vera	29 September 2026	1.46
103	3	"Malos amigos"	Raúl Olivares & Denis Languérand	30 September 2026	1.29
104	4	"Las apariencias engañan"	Raúl Olivares & Caroline Vera	1 October 2026	1.23
105	5	"Consejos"	Raúl Olivares & Denis Languérand	5 October 2026	1.07
106	6	"Investigaciones inéditas"	Raúl Olivares & Caroline Vera	7 October 2026	1.08
107	7	"Mujer araña"	Raúl Olivares & Denis Languérand	8 October 2026	1.07
108	8	"Ley del terror"	Raúl Olivares & Caroline Vera	12 October 2026	1.08
109	9	"Por la justicia"	Raúl Olivares & Denis Languérand	13 October 2026	1.31
110	10	"Viaje permanente"	Raúl Olivares & Caroline Vera	14 October 2026	N/A
111	11	"Música para alimañas"	Raúl Olivares & Denis Languérand	15 October 2026	1.07
112	12	"Aquí pasan cosas"	Raúl Olivares & Caroline Vera	19 October 2026	1.14
113	13	"Corazones rotos"	Raúl Olivares & Denis Languérand	21 October 2026	0.93
114	14	"Al vuelo"	Raúl Olivares & Caroline Vera	22 October 2026	1.13
115	15	"Sangre y fuego"	Raúl Olivares & Denis Languérand	26 October 2026	1.20
116	16	"Tejidos"	Raúl Olivares & Caroline Vera	27 October 2026	1.26
117	17	"Socios"	Raúl Olivares & Denis Languérand	28 October 2026	1.25
118	18	"Carne"	Raúl Olivares & Caroline Vera	29 October 2026	1.19
119	19	"Heridas"	Raúl Olivares & Denis Languérand	2 November 2026	0.95
120	20	"Liberación"	Raúl Olivares & Caroline Vera	3 November 2026	1.35
121	21	"Lo invisible"	Raúl Olivares & Denis Languérand	4 November 2026	1.21
122	22	"Alma libre"	Raúl Olivares & Caroline Vera	5 November 2026	1.03
123	23	"Presentimiento"	Raúl Olivares & Denis Languérand	9 November 2026	1.01
124	24	"Espinas"	Raúl Olivares & Caroline Vera	10 November 2026	1.38
125	25	"Todo cae"	Raúl Olivares & Denis Languérand	11 November 2026	1.02
126	26	"Flores a los muertos"	Raúl Olivares & Caroline Vera	12 November 2026	1.03
127	27	"Sin dirección"	Raúl Olivares & Denis Languérand	16 November 2026	1.27
128	28	"Daño colateral"	Raúl Olivares & Caroline Vera	18 November 2026	TBD
129	29	"Todo llega a su tiempo"	Raúl Olivares & Denis Languérand	19 November 2026	TBD

== Reception ==
=== Ratings ===
Viewership and ratings per season of Dra. Lucía, un don extraordinario
Season	Timeslot (CT)	Episodes	First aired		Last aired		Avg. viewers (millions)
Season	Timeslot (CT)	Episodes	Date	Viewers (millions)	Date	Viewers (millions)	Avg. viewers (millions)
1	Mon–Fri 7:30 p.m.	50	2 October 2023	0.92	8 December 2023	1.00	0.90
2	Mon–Fri 9:30 p.m.	28	21 October 2024	0.82	27 December 2024	N/A	0.88
3	Mon–Thur 9:30 p.m.	26	28 September 2026	1.17	TBA	TBD	1.16

=== Awards and nominations ===
Year	Award	Category	Nominated	Result	Ref
2024	Produ Awards	Best Short Telenovela	Dra. Lucía, un don extraordinario	Nominated	
2024	Produ Awards	Best Lead Actress - Short Telenovela	Marimar Vega	Nominated	
2024	Produ Awards	Best Fiction Producer - Superseries or Telenovela	Luis Merlo	Nominated	
