= Hidden Moon =

2012 Mexican romance film

- Film poster
- Spanish: Luna Escondida
- Directed by: José Pepe Bojórquez
- Written by: José Pepe Bojórquez; David Howard
- Produced by: José Pepe Bojórquez; Antonio Ruiz
- Starring: Wes Bentley; Ana Serradilla; Osvaldo de León; Linda Gray
- Cinematography: Chris Chomyn
- Edited by: Louis Cioffi
- Music by: Luis Bacalov
- Distributed by: Universal Pictures International
- Release date: November 23, 2012
- Running time: 121 minutes
- Countries: Mexico; United States
- Languages: English; Spanish

Hidden Moon (Spanish: Luna Escondida) is a 2012 Mexican mystery-romantic drama film directed by José Pepe Bojórquez and starring Wes Bentley, Ana Serradilla, Osvaldo de León, and Linda Gray.

== Cast ==
- Ana Serradilla as Miranda Rios
- Johnathon Schaech as William Brighton
- Linda Gray as Eva Brighton
- Osvaldo de León as Tobías
- Wes Bentley as Victor Brighton
- Héctor Jiménez as Beto
- Alejandra Ambrosi as Camila
- Angélica María as Sofia
- Emily Foxler as Susan
- Chandra West as Monica Brighton
- Jackson Hurst as Bruce
- Riley Voelkel as Christine Brighton
- Alan Gutierrez as Memo
- Olga Segura as Inés
- Scarlett Chorvat as Natasha
- Adriana Louvier as Apolonia
