= La boda de Valentina =

2018 Spanish-language film

- Directed by: Marco Polo Constandse
- Written by: Santiago Limón; Issa López; Santiago Limón
- Produced by: Tania Benitez; Marco Polo Constandse; Angela Donald; Henry Less; Toronto Unit; Issa López
- Starring: Marimar Vega; Omar Chaparro; Ryan Carnes
- Cinematography: Erwin Jaquez
- Edited by: Jorge Macaya
- Music by: Paulina Márquez; Arturo Zarate
- Production company: Pantelion Films
- Release date: 9 February 2018
- Running time: 107 minutes
- Country: Mexico
- Language: Spanish

La boda de Valentina (lit. 'Valentina's Wedding') is a 2018 romantic comedy film directed by Marco Polo Constandse. The script was written by Santiago Limón, Issa López and Santiago Limón. The film stars Marimar Vega, Omar Chaparro and Ryan Carnes.

== Plot ==
Valentina lives in New York with her boyfriend who proposes to her. She has a good life going for her until her scandalous family in Mexico needs her to pretend to be engaged to her ex-boyfriend for a while. She is denied a green card and heads to Mexico to talk to her father, a political figure, on getting rid of the fake engagement. She starts feeling bad and eventually gives in to her father's pleading. This leads to her posing with her ex as her heart struggles to tell her if she has made the right choice staying with her fiancé or falling again for her ex.

== Cast ==
- Marimar Vega : Valentina
- Omar Chaparro : Angel
- Ryan Carnes : Jason Tate
- Kate Vernon : Melanie Tate
- Christian Tappan : Demetrio
- Tony Dalton : Adrián Corcuera
- Jesús Zavala : Bernardo
- Sabine Moussier : Oralia
