= A ti te quería encontrar =

- Film poster
- Directed by: Javier Colinas
- Written by: Tamara Argamasilla
- Starring: Eréndira Ibarra; Erick Elias; Luis Arrieta; Paulette Hernández
- Cinematography: Carlos Hidalgo
- Edited by: Javier Colinas; Jorge García
- Music by: Claudio Aguilar Riquenes; Rafael Simón
- Release date: 9 June 2018 (Los Angeles)
- Country: Mexico
- Language: Spanish

A ti te quería encontrar (transl. I wanted to find you) is a 2018 Mexican romantic comedy film directed by Javier Colinas and written by Tamara Argamasilla. The film stars Eréndira Ibarra, Erick Elias, Luis Arrieta, and Paulette Hernández. It premiered on 9 June 2018 on the 10th anniversary of the HOLA Mexico Film Festival in Los Angeles.
