= Dariela los martes =

- Directed by: Mauricio T. Valle
- Screenplay by: Mauricio T. Valle
- Story by: Paola Núñez
- Produced by: Geminiano Pineda
- Starring: Paola Núñez; Mauricio T. Valle
- Cinematography: Iván Cortazar; Bernardo Daccal; César Díaz
- Edited by: Mauricio T. Valle
- Music by: Franco Medina-Mora
- Production company: Filmadora Nacional
- Distributed by: Canibal Networks; Cine Canibal
- Release date: 4 December 2014 (Mexico)
- Country: Mexico
- Language: Spanish

Dariela los martes is a 2014 Mexican drama film directed by Mauricio T. Valle. The film starred by Paola Núñez and Mauricio T. Valle in lead roles. It premiered on December 4, 2014.

== Plot ==
An actress named Dariela (Paola Núñez), in the midst of a personal crisis, meets Rodrigo (Mauricio T. Valle), who is in the middle of a divorce. They begin to work together on a project to order; Attraction and understanding are given immediately. The love story that both need and invent for their script, becomes reality. The appointment every Tuesday becomes indispensable in their lives.

== Cast ==
- Paola Núñez as Dariela
- Mauricio T. Valle as Rodrigo
- Luis Ernesto Franco
- Rafael Simón
