= Rubirosa (TV series) =

2018 Mexican television series

- Genre: Biographical drama
- Written by: Rosa Clemente García; Ana María Londoño; Rafael Noguera; Raúl Prieto
- Directed by: Juancho Cardona
- Starring: Manolo Cardona; Damián Alcázar; Ana Serradilla
- Country of origin: Mexico
- Original language: Spanish
- No. of seasons: 1
- No. of episodes: 12

Production
- Executive producers: Juancho Cardona; Manolo Cardona
- Editor: Jonathan Pellicer
- Production company: 11:11 Films

Original release
- Network: Claro Video
- Release: 28 November 2018

Rubirosa is a Mexican biographical drama web television series produced by 11:11 Films & TV for Claro Video. The series is based on the life of the diplomat, military officer, race car driver and polo player Porfirio Rubirosa. It stars Manolo Cardona as the titular character. The first season premiered via streaming on 28 November 2018 and consists of 12 episodes.

== Cast ==
- Manolo Cardona as Porfirio Rubirosa
- Damián Alcázar as Rafael Leonidas Trujillo
- Ana Serradilla as Candelaria Benavente
- Carolina Guerra as Flor de Oro Trujillo
- Héctor Aníbal as John
- Shalim Ortiz as Ramfis Trujillo
- Sergio Luis Boza Gómez as Fulgencio Batista
- Jorge Perugorría as Don Pablo Rubirosa
- Ludwika Paleta as Zsa Zsa Gabor
- Gabriela de la Garza as Barbara Hutton
- Tessa Ía as Adele Chardin (based on Odile Rodin)
- Natalia Varela as Denisse Darraidou (based on Danielle Darrieux)
- Luz Cipriota as Evita Perón
- Katarina Čas as Doris Duke
- Margarita Muñoz as Nina Lobato
- Antonio Von Hildebrand as Porfirio Rubirosa (voice)

== Awards and nominations ==
Year	Award	Category	Recipient	Result
2019	India Catalina Awards	Best Telenovela or Series	Rubirosa	Nominated
