= A la mala =

- Film poster
- Directed by: Pedro Pablo Ibarra
- Written by: Issa López; Ari Rosen
- Produced by: Jorge Aragón
- Starring: Aislinn Derbez; Mauricio Ochmann; Luis Arrieta; Aurora Papile; Daniela Schmidt; Juan Diego Covarrubias; Alejandra Guilmant
- Edited by: Camilo Abadia
- Production company: Pantelion Films
- Distributed by: Videocine
- Release date: 27 February 2015 (United States)
- Running time: 106 minutes
- Country: Mexico
- Language: Spanish
- Box office: $10.26 million

A la mala (Spanish for: By foul means) is a 2015 Mexican romantic comedy film directed by Pedro Pablo Ibarra and starring Aislinn Derbez and Mauricio Ochmann. It was written by Issa López and Ari Rosen. The film received mixed reviews.

== Cast ==
- Aislinn Derbez as Maria Laura "Mala" Medina
- Mauricio Ochmann as Santiago
- Catherine Papile as Kika
- Luis Arrieta as Pablo
- Daniela Schmidt as Patricia
- Juan Diego Covarrubias as Alvaro
- José Ron as Jerónimo
- Iván Sánchez as Rafa
- Ignacio Casano as boyfriend of Dani
- Mane de la Parra as barman
- Altair Jarabo as Susana
- Patricio Borghetti as himself
- Eugenio Derbez as himself (cameo)

== Reception ==
Reviews for A la mala have been mixed. On review aggregator website Rotten Tomatoes, the film has a 43% approval rating based on 7 reviews, with an average rating of 5.8/10 and the consensus that it is "a masterfully subtle and poignant exploration of morality." Audiences surveyed by CinemaScore gave the film an average grade of "A" on an A+ to F scale.

The News Tribune said: "A la Mala begins with promise and finishes well enough to justify the investment in time. It's all that dull, formulaic stuff mediados pelicula (mid movie) that sucks the salt right off the tequila glass and leaves this one too stale to swallow."
