= Paola Núñez =

Mexican actress (born 1978)

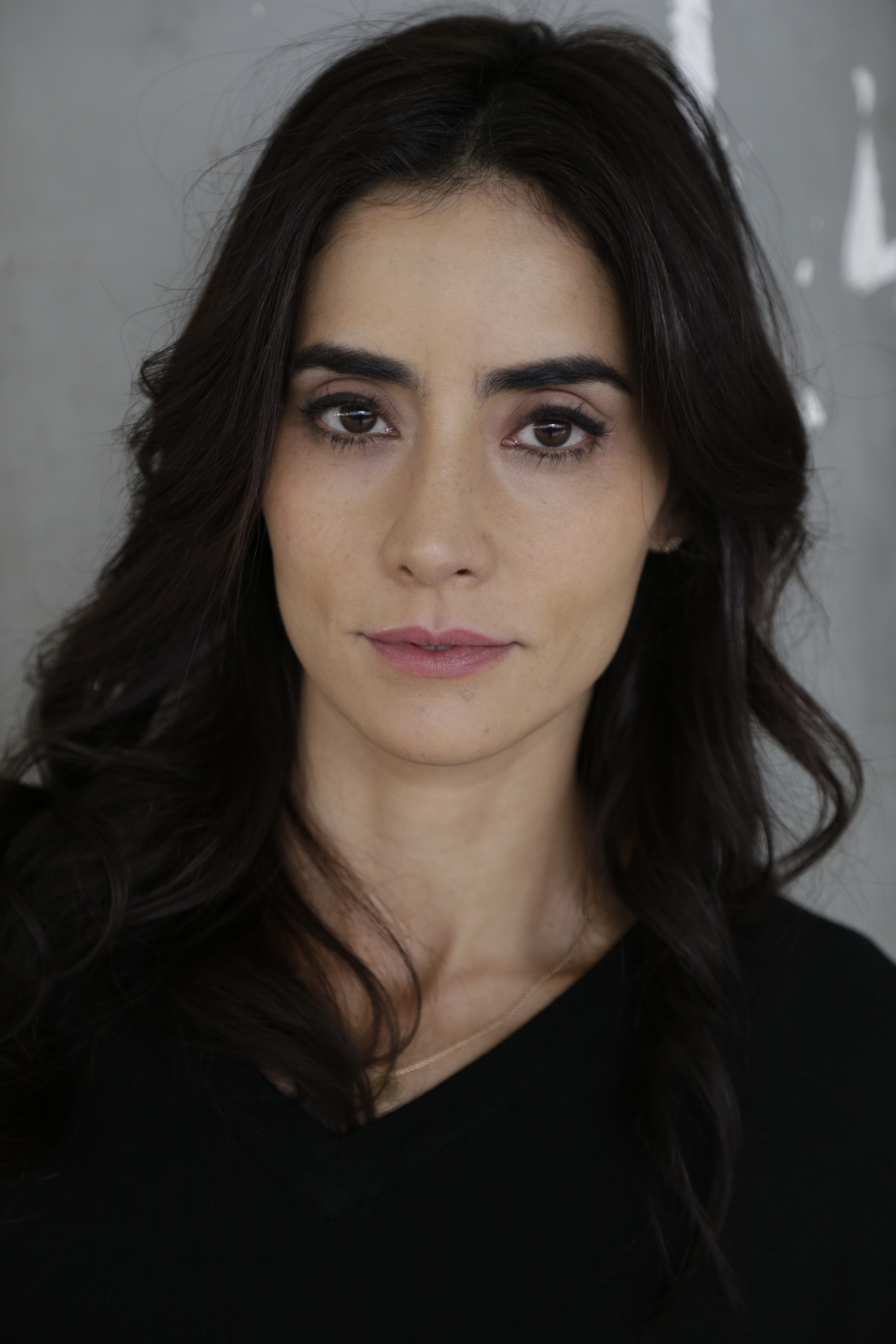
- Núñez in 2016
- Born: Paola Núñez Rivas; 8 April 1978 (age 48); Tecate, Baja California, Mexico
- Occupation: Actress
- Years active: 2001–present
- Known for: Amor en custodia

Paola Núñez Rivas (born 8 April 1978) is a Mexican actress. She became known for her role as Barbie in Amor en Custodia (2005), a TV Azteca telenovela, and for her role as Evelyn Marcus in the Netflix series Resident Evil (2022).

She began her career on theatrical stages at the age of 12, years later in 1995 she would begin to participate in television. She is a graduate of the TV Azteca acting school, CEFAC.

Paola has enjoyed some success, with starring roles in telenovelas such as Las Juanas (2004), Mientras Haya Vida (2007), Pasión Morena (2009) and Reina de Corazón (2014). In cinema, Paola has appeared in films such as Deseo (2013), Detrás del Poder (2013), El Más Buscado (2014), El Cumple De La Abuela (2015), Bad Boys for Life (2020) and Bad Boys: Ride or Die (2024).

== Personal life ==
Núñez was born in Tecate, Baja California, Mexico. She started acting in theater at the age of 12. At the age of 16, she began her full-time career as an actress and graduated from the acting school CEFAC TV Azteca. Núñez also produces soap operas.

She remains close friends with Andrés Palacios, with whom she co-starred in Amor en Custodia, a notable telenovela in both their careers. She is fond of extreme sports.

== Career ==
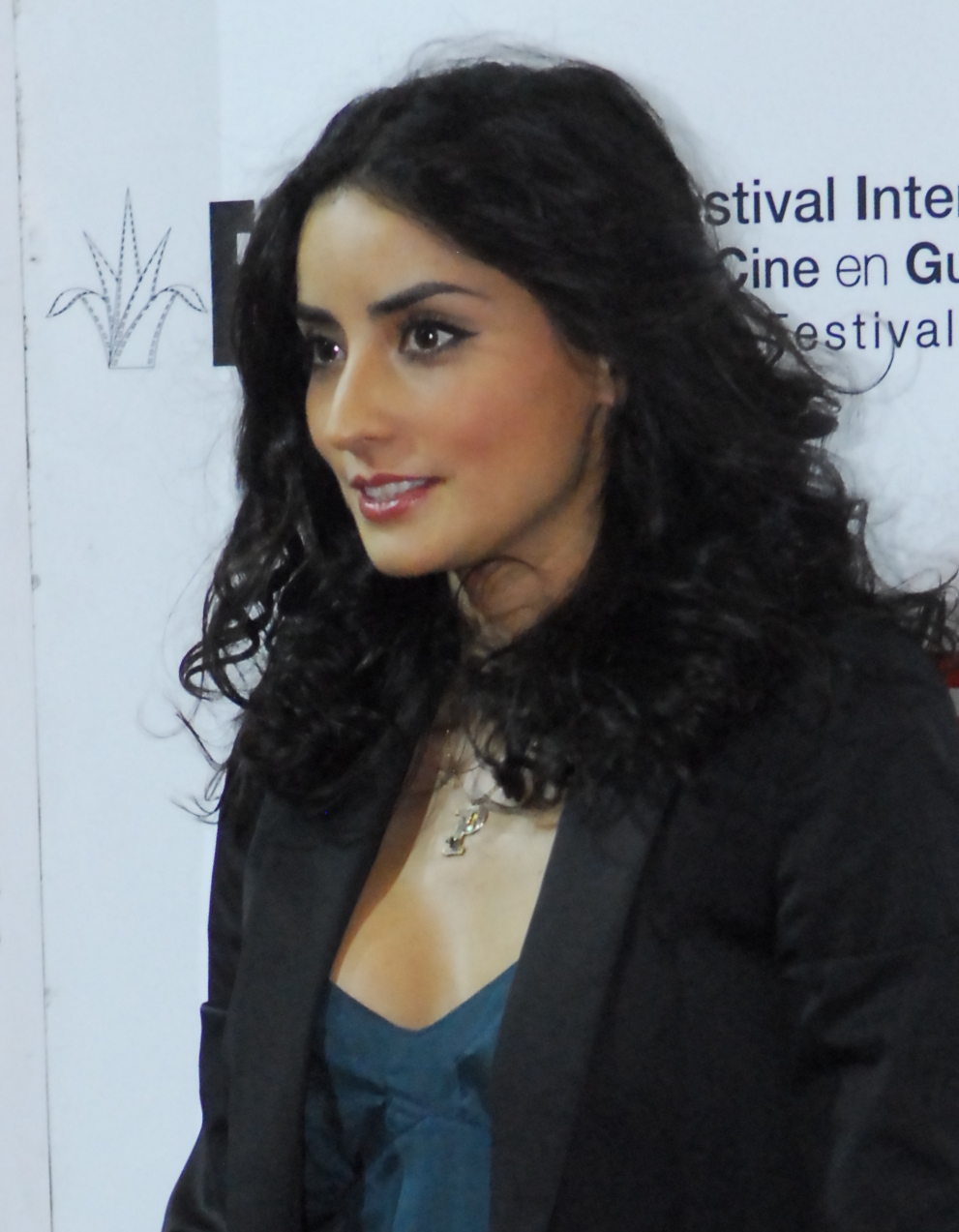
Núñez in 2010

She began her career at age 12 in plays and sixteen in television. She became notable in Mexican television through the role of "Barbara Bazterrica" in the telenovela Amor en custodia. In 2007 she joined the cause of Greenpeace to raise public awareness about global warming. She has also been featured in several national magazines such as GQ in Mexico.

In July 2010, she appeared in the play Cinco mujeres usando el mismo vestido in Mexico playing Trisha.

The Mexican actress made the villain in the mini series Cien Años de Perdón, a co-production of FIC Latin America and Teleantioquia through TeleColombia same starring actors Ana Claudia Talancón and Manolo Cardona, written by Luis Langlemey (Kdabra, Cumbia Ninja). 2014 Núñez starred in the American telenovela Reina de Corazones along with Eugenio Siller and Laura Flores as the main protagonists while Juan Soler and Catherine Siachoque act as antagonists.

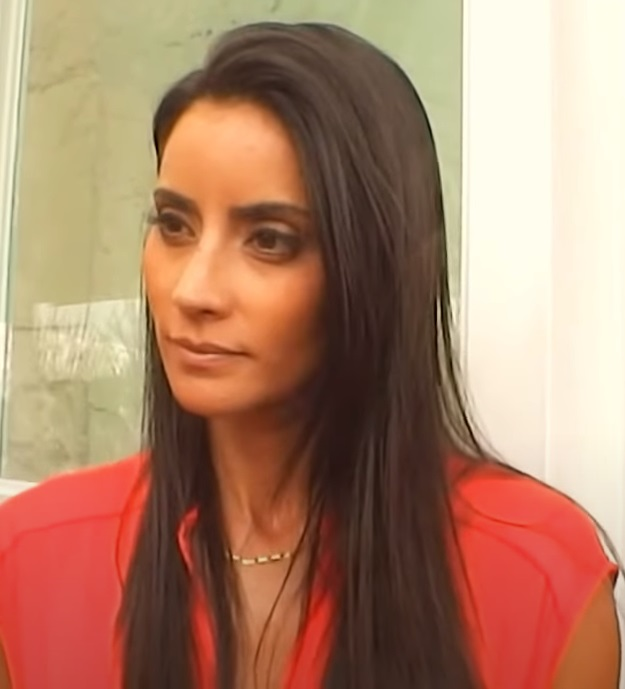
Núñez in 2013

Paola acted as Evelyn Marcus in the Netflix action horror series Resident Evil in 2022.

== Filmography ==
=== Film ===
Year	Title	Roles	Notes
2004	Miss Carrusel	Claudia	Short film
2005	Ver, oír y callar		
2009	Tres piezas de amor en un fin de semana	Teresa	
2010	Depositarios	Verónica	
2010	Sin ella	Alejandra	
2011	Los inadaptados	Lucrecia	
2013	Deseo	Jovencita	
2013	Detrás del poder	Mónica	Also as producer
2014	El más buscado	Sonia	Also as writer and producer
2014	Dariela los martes	Dariela	
2015	El Cumple de la Abuela	Andrea	
2019	La Boda de la Abuela	Andrea	
2020	Bad Boys for Life	Rita Secada	
2023	Queens on the Run	Famela Guerra	
2024	Bad Boys: Ride or Die	Rita Secada	

=== Television ===
Year	Title	Roles	Notes
2001	Como en el cine	Karen	
2002	Súbete a mi moto	Leticia	
2004	La vida es una canción	Margarita	Episode: "Magia"
2004–2005	Las Juanas	Juana Micaela	Main role; 130 episodes
2005	Lo que callamos las mujeres	Isabel	Episode: "¿Me veo bien?
2005–2006	Amor en custodia	Bárbara Bazterrica	Main role; 234 episodes
2007–2008	Mientras haya vida	Elisa Montero	Main role; 188 episodes
2009–2010	Pasión morena	Morena Madrigal Rueda	Main role; 184 episodes
2013	Destino	Valeria González / Valeria Ríos de Montesinos	Main role; 105 episodes
2014	Reina de corazones	Reina Ortíz	Main role; 140 episodes
2014	Palabra de ladrón	Julia Lagos	Main role; 12 episodes
2015	Runner	Alba	Television film
2017	La Hermandad	Natalia Alagon	Main role; 4 episodes
2017–2019	The Son	María García	Main role (seasons 1–2); 20 episodes
2019	La Reina del Sur	Manuela Cortés Santos	Main role (season 2); 33 episodes
2019	The Purge	Esme Carmona	Main role (season 2); 10 episodes
2020	Deputy	Valeria	Episode: "10-8 Firestone"
2021	Calls	Ana (voice)	Episode: "Me, Myself & Darlene"
2021	Magnum P.I.	Helen	Episode: "Double Jeopardy"
2022	Resident Evil	Evelyn Marcus	Main role; 7 episodes
2023	The Fall of the House of Usher	Dr. Alessandra Ruiz	Miniseries; 5 episodes
2024	Fire Country	Roberta	

Key
†	Denotes works that have not yet been released

== Awards and nominations ==
Year	Award	Category	Nominated work	Result
2006	Diosas de Plata	Female Revelation	Ver, oír y callar	Nominated
2006	Premios Bravo	Best New Actress	Amor en custodia	Won
2012	Premios de la Agrupación de Periodistas Teatrales (APT)	Best Comedy Actress	Un, dos, tres por mi y todos mis amores	Won
2013	55 Premios Ariel	Best Makeup	Herself	Nominated
2014	People en Español	Best Actress	Reina de corazones	Nominated
2014	People en Español	Best on-screen chemistry	Reina de corazones	Nominated
2014	Miami Life Awards	Best Female Lead in a Telenovela	Reina de corazones	Won
2014	Premios Tu Mundo	Favorite Lead Actress	Reina de corazones	Nominated
