= Daniel & Ana =

- Theatrical poster
- Directed by: Michel Franco
- Written by: Michel Franco
- Produced by: Daniel Berman Ripstein
- Starring: Darío Yazbek Bernal; Marimar Vega; José María Torre
- Cinematography: Chuy Chávez
- Edited by: Óscar Figueroa
- Release date: May 18, 2009 (Cannes Film Festival)
- Running time: 90 minutes
- Country: Mexico
- Language: Spanish

Daniel & Ana is a 2009 Mexican thriller drama film directed by Michel Franco. It had its world premiere on May 18, 2009, at the Cannes Film Festival and stars Darío Yazbek Bernal and Marimar Vega. The movie follows two siblings that are kidnapped and forced to have sex on camera, as well as the emotional trauma that follows afterwards.

== Plot ==
Daniel and Ana live with their wealthy parents in Mexico City. Daniel has a girlfriend, Mariana, while Ana is engaged to Rafa, who wants to take a job offer in Spain. One day while running errands, the siblings are kidnapped at gunpoint and, under threat of being raped and killed, are filmed stripping and having sex. The kidnappers call their anonymous client confirming they have the video while intending to force more siblings to take part in more videos. Though returned home unharmed, their lives are shattered: they cannot talk to each other or to anybody else about the experience. Daniel and Ana fail to find their intimate video online.

In time, Ana proves more resilient, consulting a psychiatrist and reconciling with Rafa. But Daniel's emotional state remains in turmoil, because he was not wholly repulsed by sex with the attractive older sister he has always loved, even though theirs was a situation of coerced rape and not love. Ana insists on Daniel joining her in therapy, but he refuses. At night, a conflicted Daniel sneaks into Ana's room and violently rapes her. Ana moves out intending on moving to Spain with Rafa, while Daniel tries in vain to make her stay and then attempts to rape Mariana after his sister rejects him. On Ana's wedding day, he buys a dagger to take to ceremony, but can't bring himself to kill Rafa. Instead he takes Rafa's drink and ejaculates in it before returning it to his unsuspecting brother-in-law. The newlyweds say their goodbyes to Ana's family with the siblings partying ways after sharing an awkward hug.

A message at the end of the film warns against a rise in pornography using coerced amateurs. Another message claims the real siblings whose story was used to make the movie never found out what happened to the video they were forced to take part in.

== Cast ==
- Darío Yazbek Bernal as Daniel Torres
- Marimar Vega as Ana Torres
- José María Torre as Rafa
- Franco Abisua as Agrupación Cariño
- Cecilia Franco Abruch as Amiga Boda
- José de Jesús Aguilar as Sacerdote
- Gary Alazraki as Amigo Borracho
- Mark Alazraki as Amigo Fiesta
- Elías Alfille as Borracho 1
- Irma Berlanga as Recepcionista
- José Luis Caballaro as Amigo Boda
- Jéssica Castelán as Mariana
- Gabriel de Cervantes as Secuestrador 3
- Cecilia Levy Franco as Amiga Boda
- Sara Levy Franco as Niña Boda

== Production ==
Marimar Vega said that before going to talk with director Michel Franco, "There were some nerves about the nudity that had to be done, but when I talked to him and he explained how he was going to work with me, how he was going to take it, they went away."

== Reception ==
Critical reception for Daniel & Ana was mixed and the film holds a rating of 50% on Rotten Tomatoes (based on 6 reviews) and 43 on Metacritic (based on 5 reviews). The New York Times gave a mixed review, stating that while the film's "stylistic restraint may help deflect accusations of exploitation", they also thought that the muted emotions in the film "impedes our connection with the victims". The Village Voice also gave a mixed review, saying that the film was effective until the final act which they felt "tips the film's delicate balance over into lurid grotesquerie, even as [Franco's] staging remains as consciously muted as ever."
