= Pasión morena =

Mexican telenovela

- Created by: Ricardo Rodriguez; Claudia Pineiro
- Developed by: TV Azteca
- Directed by: Carlos A. Guerra; Andres Palacios
- Starring: Victor González; Paola Núñez
- Theme music composer: Jorge Avedano
- Opening theme: "Pasion Morena" Performed by Samuel C
- Ending theme: "Pasion Morena" Performed by Olga Tañon
- Country of origin: Mexico
- Original language: Spanish
- No. of episodes: 185

Production
- Executive producer: Emilia Lamonthe
- Producers: Rita Fusaro; Claudia Meilan
- Production location: Mexico City
- Editors: Miguel Sanchez C Feroca; Rigel Sosa Andrade
- Camera setup: Multi-camera
- Running time: 42 minutes
- Production company: TV Azteca

Original release
- Network: Azteca Trece
- Release: 2009 – February 5, 2010

Pasión morena (Morena) is a Mexican telenovela by TV Azteca. It premiered in 2009. The protagonists are Victor González and Paola Núñez. Other actors include Anette Michel, Fernando Ciangherotti, Ari Telch and Evangelina Elizondo. The series also marks the return of González and Michel to TV Azteca.

== Cast ==
=== Main cast ===
- Victor González - Leo Hernandez/Fernando Sirenio
- Paola Núñez - Morena Madrigal Rueda vda. de Salomon
- Anette Michel - Emilia Dumont/Cassandra Rodriguez
- Fernando Ciangherotti - Aldo Sirenio
- Ari Telch - LLamita/Flavio Sirenio
- Evangelina Elizondo - Josefina Sirenio

=== Main supporting cast ===
- María Renée Prudencio - Elena Sirenio
- Andrea Noli - Silvia Rueda
- Víctor Huggo Martin - Roberto Cárdenas
- Segundo Cernadas - Oscar Salomón
- Alberto Guerra - Ramiro Negrete/El Diablo

Special Participation

- José Alonso - Adolfo Rueda
- Javier Gómez - Lucio Sirenio
- Fernando Sarfati

=== Supporting casts ===
- Amaranta Ruíz - Viviana
- Erika de la Rosa - Isela Teran
- Lambda García - Gustavo "Gus-Gus" Sirenio
- María Fernanda Quiroz - Jazmín
- Alejandro Lukini - Ernesto "Neto" Rodriguez
- Sergio Bonilla - Jesús "Chucho"
- Juan Valentín - Pedro Hernández
- Antonio Gaona - Ángel
- Marcela Guirado - Georgia Madrigal
- Flavio Peniche - "El perro" Salazar
- Enrique Muñoz - Julio
- Silvia Santoyo - Luisa
- Mar Carrera - Gloria

Special Participation

- Salvador Hurtado
- Rolando De La Mora - "El guero"
- Martin Navarrete - Dr. Fernandez
- Jair de Rubin - "Polo"
- Emmanuel Morales - "El Chaleco"
- Sebastian Ferrat
- Hector Garibay
