= The Misfits (2011 film) =

- Spanish: Los inadaptados
- Directed by: Javier Colinas; Marco Polo Constandse; Jorge Ramírez Suárez; Sergio Tovar Velarde
- Starring: Luis Arrieta; Luis Ernesto Franco; Paola Núñez; Tiaré Scanda; Ana Serradilla
- Cinematography: Carlos Hidalgo
- Music by: Axel Ricco; Sebastian Bell
- Production companies: Los Güeros Films; Beanca Films; Eficine
- Release date: 28 March 2011
- Running time: 107 minutes
- Country: Mexico
- Language: Spanish

The Misfits (Spanish: Los inadaptados), is a 2011 Mexican anthology comedy-drama film, written and starring Luis Arrieta in 2011. It features performances of Ana Serradilla, Luis Ernesto Franco, Paola Núñez and Tiaré Scanda.

== Plot ==
A solitary boy does not want to live anymore until he meets a girl who pretends it to be a "Star" player. An arrogant Attorney receives a lesson by staying stuck in an elevator with a maid servant out of series. A "computer-freak" make an appointment blindly on the internet, the stranger turns out to be not as "unknown". Five elders decide to kill boredom and are planning to Rob a bank.

== Cast ==
- Luis Arrieta as Armando
- Luis Ernesto Franco as Gilberto
- Paola Núñez as Lucrecía
- Tiaré Scanda as Alma
- Eugenio Bartilotti as Agustín
- Hector Kotsifakis as Raúl
- Maya Zapata as Graciela
- Ana Serradilla as Sofía
- Joaquín Cordero as Don Luis
- Beatriz Aguirre as Anita
- Isela Vega as Rosario
- Patricio Castillo as Manuelito
- Justo Martínez as Don Diego
- Rosa María Bianchi as Carlota
- Anna Ciocchetti as Señora Quiñones
- Luis Miguel Lombana as Carlos
