= Tiaré Scanda =

Mexican actress (born 1974)

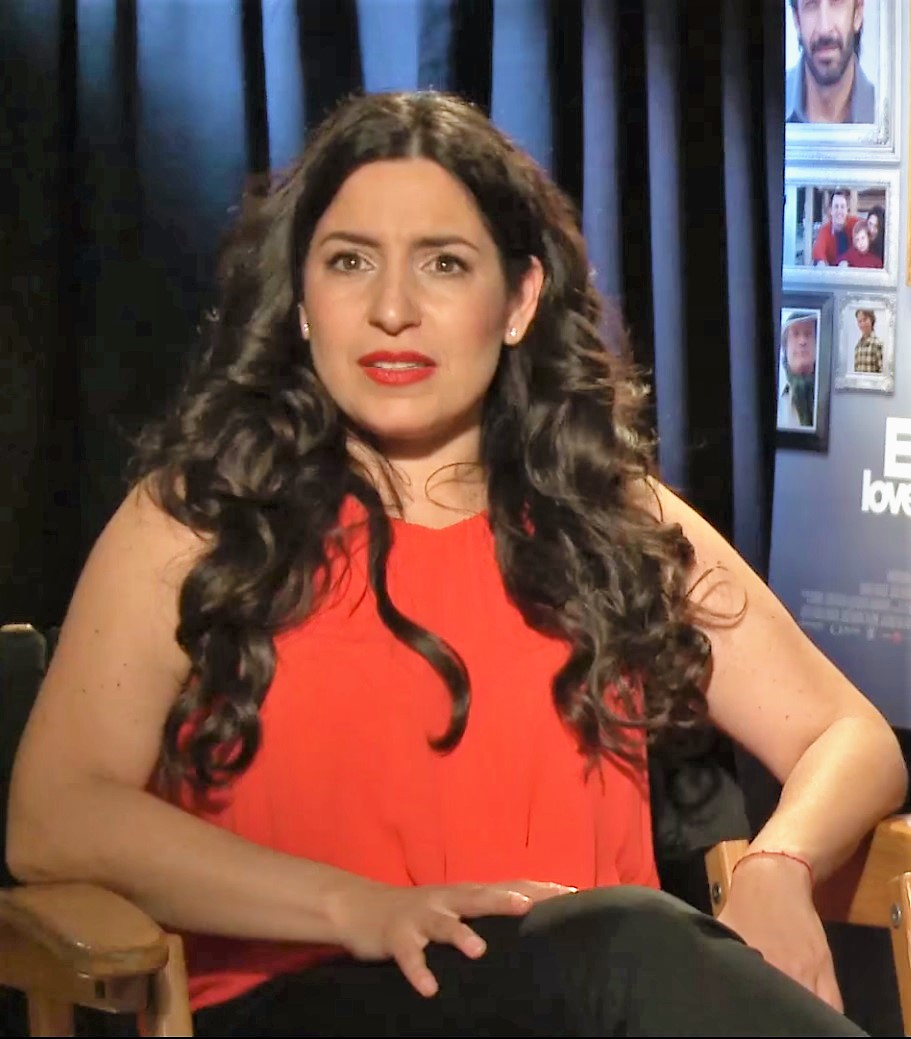
- Scanda interviewed by Dulce Osuna about Everybody Loves Somebody in 2017
- Born: Tiaré Scanda Flores; January 6, 1974 (age 52); Mexico City, D.F., Mexico
- Occupations: Actress, Writer and Producer
- Years active: 1990-present

Tiaré Scanda (pronounced [tjaˈɾe esˈkanda]; born Tiaré Scanda Flores on January 6, 1974 in Mexico City, D.F., Mexico) is a Mexican actress.

== Filmography ==
Telenovelas and Series
Year	Title	Role	Notes
1990-91	En carne propia	Pingüinita	Supporting role
1991	Cadenas de amargura	Liliana Ayala	Supporting role
1991-92	Muchachitas	Elena Olivares Pérez	Main role
1993-94	Buscando el paraíso	Alma	Supporting role
1994-06	Mujer, casos de la vida real	various	11 episodes
1995	Si Dios me quita la vida	Rosario	Supporting role
1996	La culpa	Isabel Lagarde	Main role
1996	Azul	Karina	Supporting role
1999-2000	Laberintos de pasión	Rocío González	Supporting role
2003-04	Bajo la misma piel	Aurora Romero	Supporting role
2003-04	Amarte es mi pecado	Casilda Gómez / Casilda Guzmán Madrigal de Horta	Supporting role
2004-06	Rebelde	Gláucia Gandía Rosalez / Galia Dunoff de Gandía	Recurring role
2007-08	Lola...Érase una vez	Milagros Ramos	Supporting role
2008-09	Alma de Hierro	Juliana	Supporting role
2009	Locas de amor	Paula	Supporting role
2009	Hermanos y Detectives		Episode: "El enigma de otro mundo"
2010	Mujeres Asesinas 3	Caridad	Episode: "Las cotuchas, empresarias"
2010	Gritos de muerte y libertad	Inés de Jaurégui	Episode: "El primer sueño"
2011	Rafaela	Rosalba Martínez	Supporting role
2012	Por Ella Soy Eva	Marcela Noriega de Contreras	Supporting role
2013	Como dice el dicho	Estela	Episode: "Tanto va el cántaro al agua"
2013	Corazón Indomable	Clorinda	Guest role
2013-14	Qué Pobres Tan Ricos	Vilma Terán Sade	Supporting role
2014	La Viuda Negra	Ana Blanco	Supporting role
2016	Sin rastro de ti	Doctora Rebecca Arias	Supporting role
2018	El recluso	Azucena Tavares	Supporting role
2022	La herencia	Rosa Gutiérrez de Millán	Supporting role
2023	El colapso	Mayra	Episode: "El supermercado"

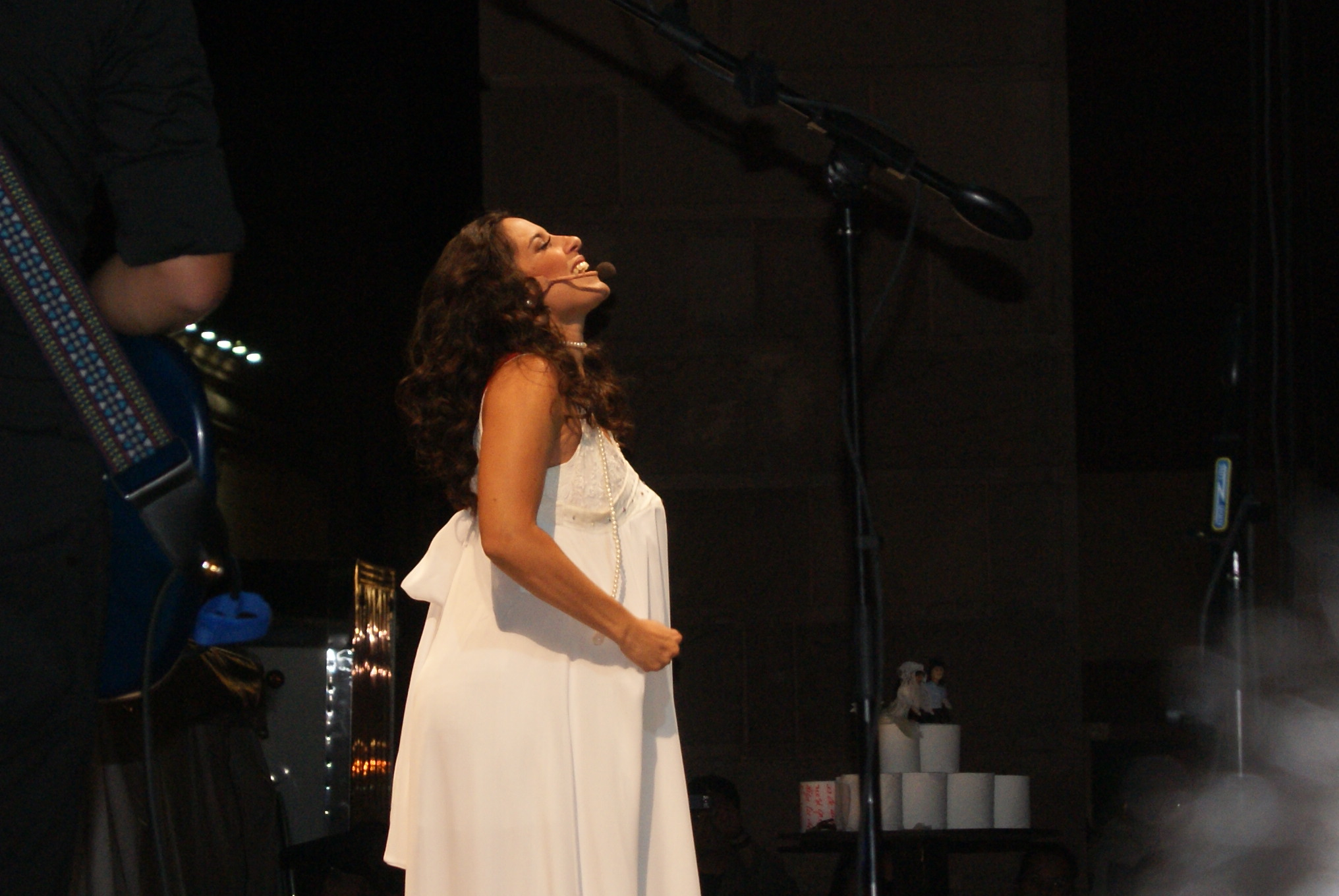
Scanda in 2010

Films
Year	Title	Role
1991	Miss. Amnesia	
1992	Murallas de silencio	
1992	Lamentos	
1993	Un año perdido	
1993	Pueblo viejo	
1995	Sin remitente	Mariana
1995	El callejón de los milagros	Maru
1996	Tres minutos en la oscuridad	
1996	Salón México	Beatriz
1999	En un claroscuro de la luna	Nilda
2000	Sin dejar huella	Aurelia
2000	De ida y vuelta	Soledad
2001	I Love You Baby	Marisol
2002	Una de dos	Constitución Gamal
2006	Sexo, amor y otras perversiones	Mayán
2007	Párpados azules	Lucía Farfán
2010	Preludio	Cecilia
2011	Los inadaptados	Alma
2016	El Cumple de la Abuela	Diana
2017	Everybody Loves Somebody	Abby
2018	Olimpia	Raquel's mother
2019	La Boda de la Abuela	Diana
2020	El club de los idealistas	Susana
2021	The Black Minutes	Lolita

Theater
Year
Finísimas Personas (2018) Author, Director and Actress
Verano y humo
Una pareja con ángel
Parada San Ángel
El árbol del humo
A Midsummer Night's Dream
La fogata Palibantinu
Rosa de dos aromas
Cabaret (Sally Bowles)
Magnolias de acero
Con la P en la frente
Canal de las que enseñan
Canciones que Curan
Marido en venta

== Awards and nominations ==
=== TVyNovelas Awards ===
Year	Category	Telenovela	Result
1992	Best Female Revelation	Muchachitas	Won
2004	Best Co-Star Actress	Amarte es mi pecado	Nominated
2013	Best Co-Star Actress	Por Ella Soy Eva	Nominated
2015	Best Supporting Actress	Qué pobres tan ricos	Nominated

=== Premios Diosas de Plata ===
Year	Category	Film	Result
2001	Best Female Co-Star	De ida y vuelta	Nominated
2017	Best Supporting Actress	Estar o No Estar	Won

=== Premios Ariel ===
Year	Category	Film	Result
1996	Best Supporting Actress	El callejón de los milagros	Nominated
2017	Best Supporting Actress	El Cumple de la Abuela	Nominated
