= Amor cautivo =

Mexican telenovela

- Genre: Telenovela
- Created by: Laura Visconti
- Written by: Carolina Rivera; Mauricio Somuano
- Directed by: Fernando Sariñana; Javier Patron Fox; Salvador Cartas; Karla Farjeat
- Starring: Marimar Vega; Arap Bethke; Hector Bonilla; Patricia Bernal; Fernando Ciangherotti; Andrés Palacios; Eduardo Arroyuelo
- Theme music composer: Samuel Castelán Marini
- Opening theme: "Amor cautivo" by Julio Preciado and Myriam Montemayor Cruz
- Country of origin: Mexico
- Original language: Spanish
- No. of episodes: 120

Production
- Executive producer: José Ambris
- Producer: Armando Navarro
- Production locations: Mexico City, Mexico; Los Angeles; Tlaxcala
- Production company: TV Azteca

Original release
- Network: Azteca Trece
- Release: 28 May – 9 November 2012

Related
- Lejana como el viento (2000)

Amor cautivo (English title Prisoner love), is a Mexican telenovela produced by TV Azteca in association with Corazón TV. It stars Marimar Vega and Arap Bethke as the main protagonists. Filming starts on 6 May 2012. It is based on Lejana como el viento by Laura Visconti.

In 2015, it premiered in Africa on the Eva Channel (141 English dub and 508 Portuguese dub) on DSTV.

== Cast ==
- Marimar Vega as Alejandra Santacruz
- Arap Bethke as Fernando Bustamante Arizmendi
- Hector Bonilla as Félix Del Valle
- Patricia Bernal as Maribel Sosa de Arismendi
- Fernando Ciangherotti as Jorge Bustamante
- Andrés Palacios as Javier del Valle
- Eduardo Arroyuelo as Mauricio Delgado
  Edmundo Grijalva/Raymundo Figueroa
- Cecilia Ponce as Eugenia Rángel
- Andrea Noli as Beatriz Del Valle
- Luis Felipe Tovar as Commandante Alfredo Linares
- Alberto Guerra as Ramiro Estrada
- Juan Pablo Medina as Efraín Valdemar
- Vanessa Ciangherotti as Ángela
- Barbara de Regil as Vanessa Ledesma
- Guillermo Iván Dueñas as Antonio "Tony"
- Erick Chapa as Marcelo Bustamante Arizmendi
- Patricia Garza as Tatiana
- Carla Carillo as Mariví Bustamante Arizmendi
- Alonso Espeleta as Diego Del Valle
- Mayra Rojas as Susana
- Carmen Delgado as Paula Manriquez
- Daniel Martinez as Isaias
- Marcela Ruiz Esparza as Iris
- Estela Cano as Martha Estrada
- Israel Amescua as Bryan de Jesús
- Gina Morett as Cruz
- Claudia Lobo as Gladys de Estrada
- Emilio Guerrero as Rufino Estrada
- Fernando Rubio as Paco
- Fidel Garriga as Billy Thompson
- Roberto Castañeda as Guillermo
- Keyla Wood as Panchita
- Pilar Fernández as Rebecca
- Karla Cruz as Carmen
- Javier Escobar as Jairo
- Hernán Mendoza as Camilo "Locamiro"
- Juan Manuel Bernal as Nicolas Santacruz
- Maria Renée Prudencio as Soledad gustillo de Santacruz
- Alicia Jaziz as Alejandra Santacruz (young)
