= Astro Bella =

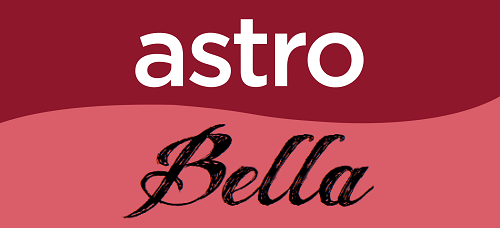
- Logo Of Astro Bella
- Country: Malaysia
- Broadcast area: Brunei; Malaysia; Singapore

Programming
- Languages: Tagalog; Thai; Vietnamese; Malay (Selected only); Spanish
- Picture format: 16:9 (576i, SDTV)

Ownership
- Owner: Astro All Asia Networks plc
- Sister channels: Astro Ria; Astro Prima; Astro Oasis; Astro Awani; Astro Ceria; Astro Citra; Astro Warna; Astro Maya HD; Astro Mustika HD

History
- Launched: 5 March 2012 (10 years ago)
- Replaced: B4U
- Closed: 1 October 2018 (7 years ago)
- Replaced by: Naura HD

Links
- Website: www.astro.com.my

Astro Bella was a ASEAN television channel by the Malaysian satellite provider Astro on channel 133. When it began broadcasting on 5 March 2012, the channel broadcast telenovelas, the first channel of its kind in Malaysia. The channel was broadcast on the channel number previously used by B4U, a Bollywood movie channel. (Astro channel 133 was previously used by B4U, which ceased broadcasting on 5 March 2012). The channel was included in the network's Mustika package. The channel contain telenovelas from the Philippines, Mexico, Thailand, Vietnam, Latin America, Brazil, Portugal, Greece, Poland, Spain, Arabia and Italy. While most telenovelas were broadcast in their original audio with Bahasa Malaysia subtitles, some of them were broadcast with dubbing in the native language.

Selected telenovelas were broadcast in HD on Astro Mustika HD. Similarly, several locally produced dramas aired on Astro Mustika HD are also available on Astro Bella.

Their programs expanded during September–October 2015 to include lifestyle programs, such as travel and cooking, in addition to telenovelas.

== See also ==
- List of programmes broadcast by Astro Bella
