= Campeones de la vida (Mexican TV series) =

- Genre: Drama, romance
- Created by: Gustavo Barrios; Diana Segovia
- Written by: Mauricio Somuano
- Directed by: Rodolfo Cela; Carlos Villegas
- Opening theme: "Que precio tiene el cielo" by Marc Anthony
- Country of origin: Mexico
- Original language: Spanish

Production
- Executive producer: Martin Luna
- Producers: Hernan Vera; Maria Auxiliadora Barrios; Maika Bernard
- Camera setup: Multi-camera
- Running time: 40-45 minutes
- Production companies: TV Azteca; Pol-Ka

Original release
- Network: Azteca 13/Azteca America
- Release: 2006

Campeones de la vida (Champions of life) is a Mexican telenovela produced by TV Azteca in 2006 starring Gabriel Porras, Ana Seradilla and Luis Ernesto Franco. It is a remake of the Argentine telenovela of the same name.

== Cast ==
- Gabriel Porras
- Ana Seradilla ... Isabel
- Luis Ernesto Franco
- Martha Mariana Castro
- Hector Bonilla
- Jesus Ochoa
- Mayra Rojas
- Gabriela Canudas ... Bety
- Paco de la O ... Eugenio
- Anna Ciochetti ... Miriam
- Laura Luz ... Ana Maria
- Hernan Mendoza ... Pedro Chaparro
- Gabriela Roel
- Carla Carillo
- Marimar Vega
- Hector Kotsifakis
- Juan C. Martin del Campo
- Fernando Alonso
- Adrian Rubio
- Guillermo Larrea
- Humberto Bua
- Mayra Sierra
- Patricia Garza
- Alfredo Herrera
- Tizoc Arroyo
- Antonio Gaona
- Ursula Pruneda
- Juan David Penagos
