= Marimar Vega =

Mexican actress (born 1983)

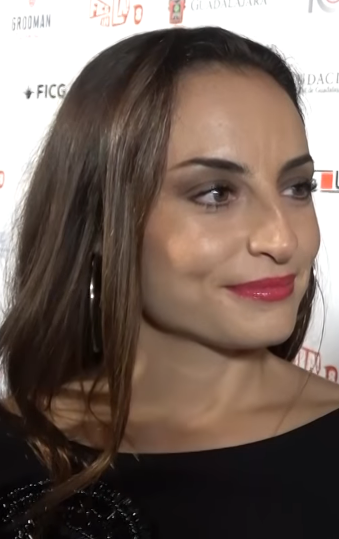
- Vega in 2018
- Born: María del Mar Vega Sisto; 14 August 1983 (age 42); Mexico City, Distrito Federal, Mexico
- Occupation: Actress
- Years active: 2000-present
- Spouses: Luis Ernesto Franco (m. 2015; div. 2018) Jerónimo Rodríguez (m. 2022)
- Parent(s): Gonzalo Vega; Leonora Sisto
- Relatives: Zuria Vega (sister); Gonzalo Vega (brother); Gabriela Vega Tovar (half-sister)

María del Mar Vega Sisto (born 14 August 1983), known professionally as Marimar Vega, is a Mexican actress. She studied acting in Centro de Formacion Actoral of TV Azteca.

== Biography ==
Vega was born 14 August 1983, in Mexico City, Distrito Federal, Mexico. She is the daughter of Mexican actor Gonzalo Vega and Leonora Sisto who is of Spanish descent. Vega has a sister who is also an actress Zuria Vega and a brother Gonzalo. Vega also has a half-sister Gabriela, from her father's side.

She practiced flamenco dance for twenty years and studied acting at the CEFAC, acting school of TV Azteca. She debuted in theater at age 17 with her father, actor Gonzalo Vega Don Juan Tenorio, playing the role of Doña Inés. Vega also acted on stage in the Perras. In movies, she has participated in Amor, Dolor y Viceversa and appeared as the protagonist in Daniel and Ana, a film that showed at the Cannes Film Festival where she was cast alongside Dario Yazbek and José María Torre.

Her television career started in Enamórate in 2003, her first TV Azteca telenovela, where she played Fedra. In 2007, she played Gina Montero in Mientras haya vida. In 2008 she played Karen in the series Noche Eterna.

In 2011 she played 'Elisa Mendoza del Real' in Emperatriz. In 2012 she played the protagonist in the telenovela Amor cautivo as Alejandra Santacruz Bustillos. In 2018, she played 'Valentina' (opposite Ryan Carnes and Omar Chaparro) in La Boda de Valentina, a film directed by Marco Polo Constandse.

== Filmography ==
Telenovelas, Series, Theater, Films
Year	Title	Role	Notes
2000	Don Juan Tenorio	Doña Inés	Theatrical Performance
2003	Enamórate	Fedra	
2003	Lo que callamos las mujeres	Viridiana	TV series
2004	La vida es una canción	Azul (young)	TV series
2004	Soñarás	Susana	Supporting role
2005	Los Sánchez	Pilar Manzini	Supporting role
2006	Campeones de la vida		
2006	Perras	La Tora	Theatrical Performance
2007-2008	Mientras haya vida	Georgina "Gina" Montero	Supporting role
2008	Fresas en Invierno	Sofía	Theatrical Performance
2008	Noche Eterna	Karen García	TV series
2009	Capadocia	Gala	TV series
2009	Doce mujeres en pugna	Marimar	Theatrical Performance
2009	Eternamente tuya	Sara Castelán	Protagonist
2009	Daniel & Ana	Ana Torres	Film
2009	Amor, dolor y viceversa		Film
2010	Cinco mujeres usando el mismo vestido	Meredith	Theatrical Performance
2010	No se si cortarme las venas o dejarmelas largas	Andrea	Theatrical Performance
2011	Aladino El Musical		Theatrical Performance
2011	Emperatriz	Elisa Mendoza del Real/Luna	Main role
2012	Amor cautivo	Alejandra Santacruz Bustillos/Alejandra del Valle Bustillos	Lead role
2013	No se si cortarme las venas o dejarmelas largas	Andrea	Film
2013-14	Las trampas del deseo	Aura Luján Velázquez	Lead role
2016	El cumple de la abuela	Ana	
2016-2017	Silvana sin lana	Stella Peréz	
2018	La boda de Valentina	Valentina	Film
2019	La boda de la abuela	Ana	
2019-2024	El juego de las llaves	Gabriela "Gaby" Albarrán	
2020	The Great Artist	Perry	Short film
2023	Dra. Lucía, un don extraordinario	Dr. Lucía Castillo	Lead role
2024-present	Profe infiltrado	Beatriz	
