= Luis Arrieta (actor) =

Mexican actor (born 1982)

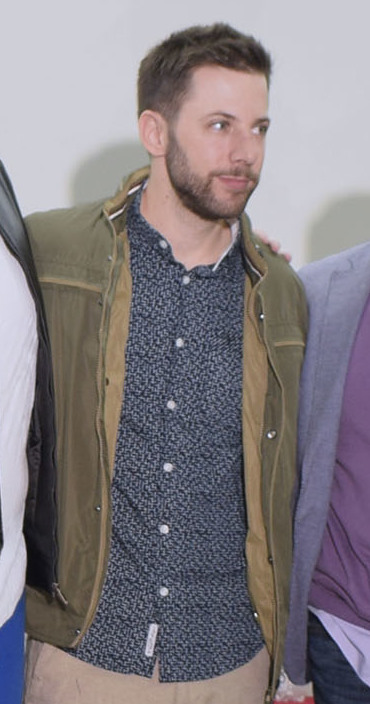
- Arrieta in 2019
- Born: 23 July 1982 (age 44); Mexico City, Distrito Federal, Mexico
- Occupation: Actor
- Years active: 2002–present

Luis Arrieta (born 23 July 1982), is a Mexican film actor, television actor producer, director and writer.

== Filmography ==
Films
Year	Title	Role	Notes
2003	Corazón de melón	Bailarin	
2007	El ride	Juan	Short film
2007	Without Finishing My Coat	Philoshoper Morgan	
2007	El besito de las buenas noches	Unknown role	Video short
2007	Celluloid Filth	Enrique / Connie	Short film
2008	The Price of the American Dream II	Manny Munoz	
2008	Chicano Blood	Chicano Gangster	Video
2009	Dragonball Evolution	Weaver	
2009	Paradas Contínuas	Emilio	
2009	Borderline	Arturo	
2010	Playa Limbo: Te dejé	Unknown role	Short film
2010	Preludio	Él	
2010	Sin ella	Andrés "Andi"	
2010	Love Equation	Esteban	
2011	Los inadaptados	Armando	Producer/writer
2011	La última muerte	Checho	
2013	Detrás del poder	Miguel	Producer/writer
2014	Cuatro lunas	Alfredo	co-producer
2014	Cantinflas	Billy	
2014	Tiempos felices	Max Quintana	
2015	A la mala	Pablo	
2015	Que viva la música	Leopoldo	
2015	Luter	Luter	Short film
2018	A ti te quería encontrar		
2023	Unhappily Ever After	Ignacio Rosas	

Television
Year	Title	Role	Notes
2002	Sin permiso de tus padres	Unknown role	
2002	Agua y aceite	Unknown role	
2002	Por tí	Beto	Recurring role
2002	Súbete a mi moto	Unknown role	
2003	Dos chicos de cuidado en la ciudad	Unknown role	
2004	Belinda	Alfredo Arismendi	Recurring role
2005–06	La vida es una canción	Antonio / Erick	Episodes: "Tú sonrisa" Episode: "No sabes como duele"
2006	Lo que callamos las mujeres	René	Episodes: "Tiene mi sangre, segunda parte"
2010	XY. La revista	Tavo	Episode: "El hombre comprometido" (Season 2, Episode 3); Episode: "El arte de bluffear con el pie izquierdo" (Season 2, Episode 5); Episode: "En busca del padre perdido" (Season 2, Episode 7); Episode: "Porque lo digo yo" (Season 2, Episode 10)
2011	A corazón abierto	Damián Velasco	
2011	El encanto del águila	Secretario John	Episode: "La traición de los herejes" (Season 1, Episode 4); Episode: "El Apostol sacrificado" (Season 1, Episode 5)
2012	Paramedicos	Salvador García	Recurring role
2024–present	Casados con hijos	Esteban "Steve" de la Madrid	Main cast
