= Luis Ernesto Franco =

Mexican actor

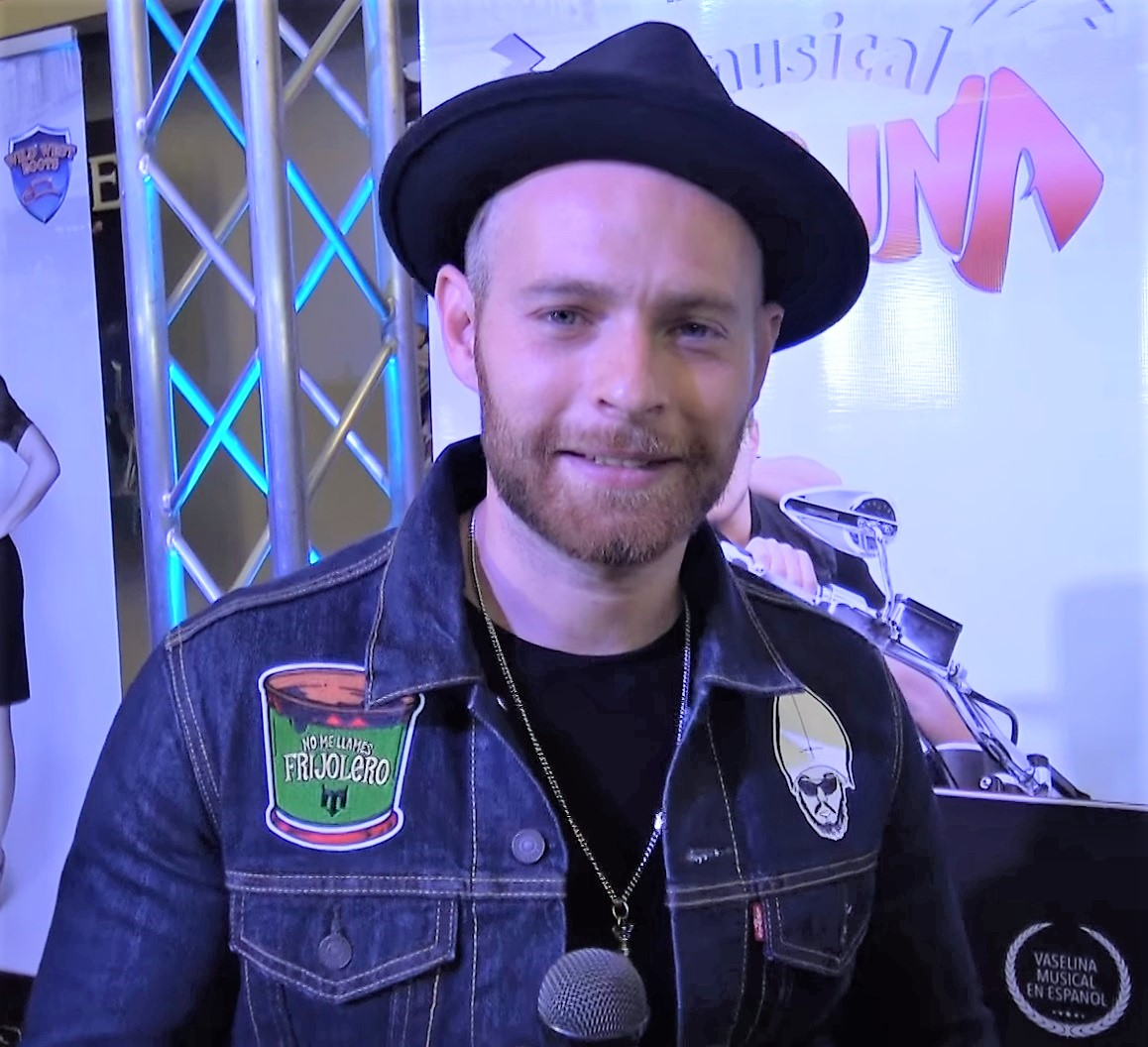
- Franco interviewed by Dulce Osuna in 2017
- Born: Luis Ernesto Franco Tiznado; December 21, 1983 (age 42); Tepic, Nayarit, Mexico
- Spouse: Marimar Vega (m. 2015; div. 2018)

Luis Ernesto Franco Tiznado (born December 21, 1983) is a Mexican actor, writer, producer and model. He is known for playing the title role in seasons three and four of the series Señora Acero.

== Filmography ==
=== Film ===
Year	Title	Role	Notes
2009	Amar	Carlos	
2009	Tres piezas de amor en un fin de semana	Joaquín	
2009	2033	Milo	
2011	Los inadaptados	Gilberto	Also producer
2012	Colosio: El asesinato	Pedro	
2013	Tlatelolco, verano del 68	Alducín	
2013	No sé si cortarme las venas o dejármelas largas	Félix	Also associate producer
2014	Obediencia perfecta	Padre Robles	
2014	Dariela los martes	Unknown role	
2015	El cumple de la abuela	Sebastián	Also producer
2018	Lo que podríamos ser	Santiago	
2022	Two Plus Two	Ricardo	

=== Television ===
Year	Title	Role	Notes
2003	La hija del jardinero	Orlando	
2004	Soñarás	Vladimir	
2005	Top Models	Tadeo	1 episode
2005	Decisiones	Julio	Episode: "Me enamoré de tú pareja"
2006	Campeones de la vida	Valentín	64 episodes
2007	Sin Vergüenza	Kike	67 episodes
2008	Secretos del alma	Alejandro Lascuráin	
2010	Vidas robadas	Francisco	
2010	Drenaje Profundo	César Velasco	Episode: "La pasión de Santa Cruz"
2011	A corazón abierto	Augusto Maza	
2013	Secretos de familia	Andrés Ventura	
2014	Camelia la Texana	Gerardo Robles "El Alacrán"	57 episodes
2015–2016	Bajo el mismo cielo	Rodrigo Martínez "El Faier"	122 episodes
2016–2018	Señora Acero	Daniel Phillips	Main role (seasons 3–4); 168 episodes
2017	Ultimate Beastmaster	Himself	Host
2018–2021	Falsa identidad	Diego Hidalgo	Main role (seasons 1–2); 171 episodes
2023	Madre de alquiler	Carlos Huizar	Main role
2023	Pacto de sangre	Marco	Main role

== Awards and nominations ==
Year	Premio	Category	Telenovela	Result
2016	Your World Awards	The Best Bad Boy	Under The Same Sky (Bajo El Mismo Cielo)	Won
2017	Your World Awards	Favorite Lead Actor	Senora Acero 3 - La Coyote	Nominated
