= City of God =

City of God may refer to:

== Arts and entertainment ==
=== Film and television ===
- City of God (2002 film) (Portuguese: Cidade de Deus), a 2002 Brazilian film based on Lins' novel
  - City of God – 10 Years Later, a 2012 Brazilian documentary about the 2002 film
- City of God (2011 film), an Indian film
- City of God: The Fight Rages On, a 2024 Brazilian television series set two decades after the events of the 2002 film

=== Literature ===
- The City of God (Latin: De civitate Dei), a 5th-century book by St. Augustine of Hippo
- City of God (Cuadros work), a 1994 collection of short stories and poems by Gil Cuadros
- City of God (Holland novel), a 1979 historical novel by Cecelia Holland
- City of God (Lins novel) (Portuguese: Cidade de Deus), a 1997 novel by Paulo Lins set in the Rio de Janeiro neighborhood Cidade de Deus
- City of God, a 2000 novel by E. L. Doctorow

=== Other arts and entertainment ===
- City of the Gods, a 1987 adventure module for the Dungeons & Dragons role-playing game
- "City of Gods", a 2022 song by Fivio Foreign, Kanye West, and Alicia Keys
- "Glorious Things of Thee Are Spoken", an 18th-century Christian hymn, a.k.a. "City of God"

== Places ==
- Cidade de Deus (Osasco), the Banco Bradesco headquarters in Osasco, São Paulo, Brazil
- Cidade de Deus, Rio de Janeiro, a neighborhood of Rio de Janeiro
- Elohim City, Oklahoma, Christian Identity community
- Jerusalem, Israel, according to Psalm 46 in the Old Testament
- Rome, since the diocese of the city is known as the Holy See and the Pope is the bishop of Rome
  - Vatican City, a sovereign state and an enclave within Rome
- Theopolis or Antioch, an ancient city in what is now Turkey called "the cradle of Christianity"

== Other uses ==
- New Jerusalem, a concept in the Abrahamic religions and Zionism

== See also ==
- Holy City (disambiguation)
