= Platino Award for Best Actress in a Miniseries or TV series =

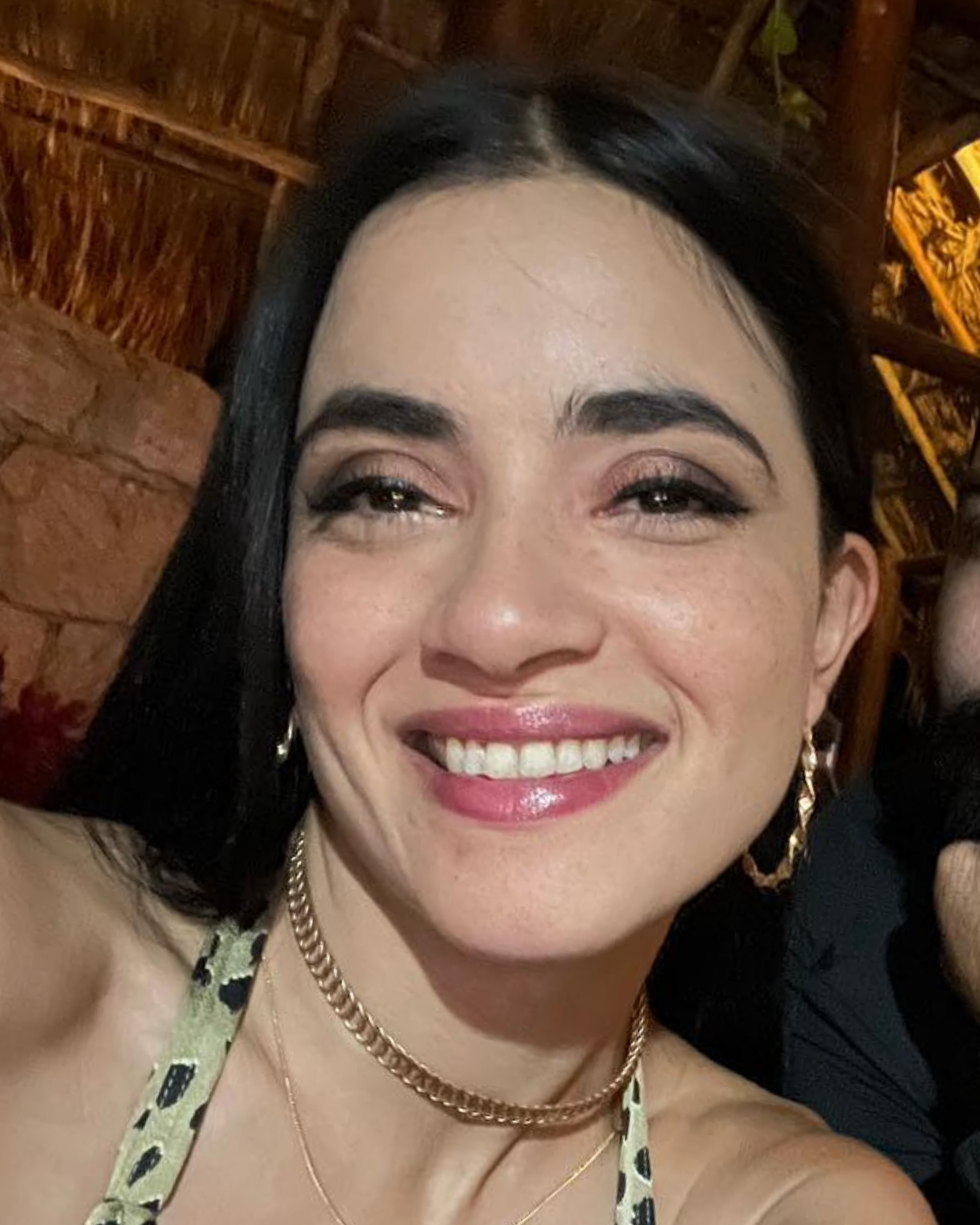
- 2026 recipient: Paulina Gaitán
- Country: Ibero-America
- Presented by: Entidad de Gestión de Derechos de los Productores Audiovisuales (EGEDA); Federación Iberoamericana de Productores Cinematográficos y Audiovisuales (FIPCA)
- Currently held by: Paulina Gaitán for The Dead Girls (2026)
- Website: premiosplatino.com

The Platino Award for Best Actress in a Miniseries or TV series (Spanish: Mejor Interpretación Femenina en Miniserie o Teleserie) is one of the Platino Awards, Ibero-America's film awards presented annually by the Entidad de Gestión de Derechos de los Productores Audiovisuales (EGEDA) and the Federación Iberoamericana de Productores Cinematográficos y Audiovisuales (FIPCA).

== History ==
Until the 3rd edition of the awards, only film categories were awarded. In 2017, the category for Best Miniseries or TV series was introduced, being followed the next year by performance categories in television productions (male lead and female lead). In 2020, the categories for acting in television were split between lead and supporting.

The category for Best Actress was first awarded in 2018 at the 5th Platino Awards with Spanish actress Blanca Suárez being the first recipient of the award for her role as Lidia Aguilar Dávila in the Netflix period drama television series Cable Girls.

Mexican actress Cecilia Suárez is the only actress who has received the award for han once winning two years in a row (2019 and 2020) for her role as Paulina de la Mora in The House of Flowers. Suárez alongside Candela Peña are the most nominated actress in the category with three nominations each, followed by Spanish actresses Inma Cuesta and Úrsula Corberó, with two each.

In the list below the winner of the award for each year is shown first, followed by the other nominees.

== Winners and nominees ==
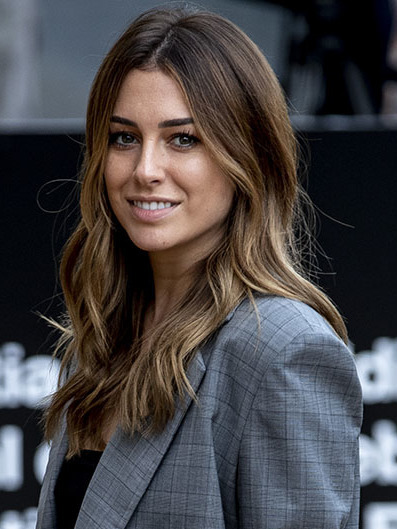
Blanca Suárez, the first recipient of the award.

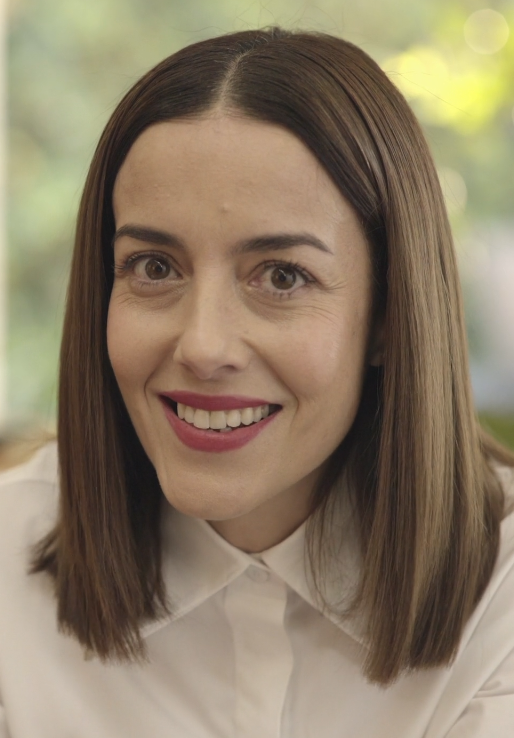
Two-time winner Cecilia Suárez.

=== 2010s ===
Year	Actor	Role(s)	English title	Original title
2018 (5th)
2018 (5th)	(Spain) Blanca Suárez	Lidia Aguilar Dávila	Cable Girls	Las chicas del cable
2018 (5th)	(Mexico) Kate del Castillo	Emilia Urquiza	Ingobernable	
2018 (5th)	(Chile) Giannina Fruttero	Ramona Sandoval	Ramona	
2018 (5th)	(Spain) Aura Garrido	Amelia Folch	El Ministerio del Tiempo	
2018 (5th)	(Spain) Marta Hazas	Clara Montesinos Martín de Ruiz	Velvet Colección	
2019 (6th)
2019 (6th)	(Mexico) Cecilia Suárez	Paulina de la Mora	The House of Flowers	La casa de las flores
2019 (6th)	(Spain) Anna Castillo	Pilar	Arde Madrid	
2019 (6th)	(Spain) Inma Cuesta	Ana Mari	Arde Madrid	
2019 (6th)	(Spain) Najwa Nimri	Zulema Zahir	Vis a vis	

=== 2020s ===
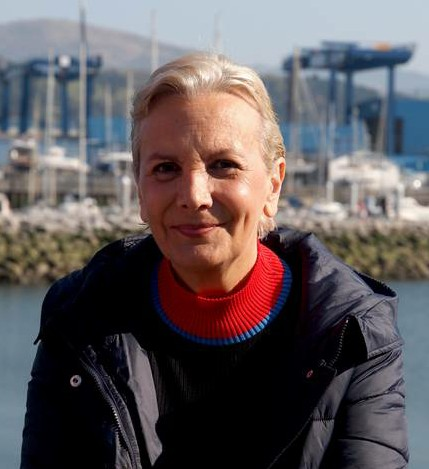
Elena Irureta won in 2021.

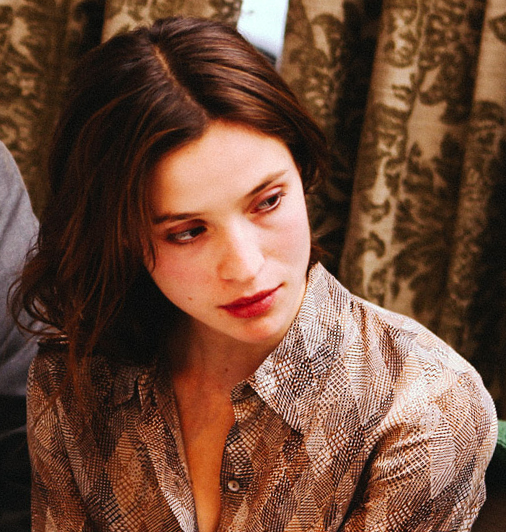
2022 winner Daniela Ramírez.

Year	Actor	Role(s)	English title	Original title
2020 (7th)
2020 (7th)	(Mexico) Cecilia Suárez	Paulina de la Mora	The House of Flowers	La casa de las flores
2020 (7th)	(Spain) Úrsula Corberó	Silene Oliveira (Tokyo)	Money Heist	La casa de papel
2020 (7th)	(Spain) Leticia Dolera	María Eugenia Aguado	Perfect Life	Vida Perfecta
2020 (7th)	(Spain) Candela Peña	Candela Montes	Hierro	
2021 (8th)	(Spain) Elena Irureta	Bittori	Patria	
2021 (8th)	(Mexico) Cecilia Suárez	Paulina de la Mora	The House of Flowers	La casa de las flores
2021 (8th)	(Spain) Inma Cuesta	Raquel Valero	The Mess You Leave Behind	El desorden que dejas
2021 (8th)	(Colombia) Marcela Benjumea	"Doña K"	The Great Heist	EL ROBO DEL $IGLO
2022 (9th)	(Chile) Daniela Ramírez	Isabel Allende	Isabel	
2022 (9th)	(Spain) Candela Peña	Candela Montes	Hierro	
2022 (9th)	(Spain) Maribel Verdú	Ana Tramel	ANA. all in	Ana Tramel. El juego
2022 (9th)	(Argentina) Mercedes Morán	Elena Vázquez Pena	El reino	
2023 (10th)	(Colombia) Cristina Umaña	Maruja Pachón	News of a Kidnapping	Noticia de un Secuestro
2023 (10th)	(Chile) Claudia Di Girolamo	Cecilia Montes	42 Days of Darkness	42 días en la oscuridad
2023 (10th)	(Uruguay) Natalia Oreiro	Eva Perón	Santa Evita	
2023 (10th)	(Mexico) Paulina Gaitán	Irene	Belascoarán	
2024 (11th)	(Spain) Lola Dueñas	Montserrat	La mesías	
2024 (11th)	(Chile) Aline Küppenheim	Hortensia Bussi Soto	Los mil días de Allende	
2024 (11th)	(Argentina) Micaela Riera	Fabiana Cantilo	El Amor Después del Amor	
2024 (11th)	(Spain) Úrsula Corberó	Rosa	Burning Body	El cuerpo en llamas
2025 (12th)	(Spain) Candela Peña	Rosario Porto	The Asunta Case	El caso Asunta
2025 (12th)	(Mexico) Azul Guaita	Tita	Like Water for Chocolate	Como agua para chocolate
2025 (12th)	(Brazil) Andréia Horta	Jerusa	City of God: The Fight Rages On	Cidade de Deus: A Luta Não Para
2025 (12th)	(Colombia) Marleyda Soto	Úrsula Iguarán	One Hundred Years of Solitude	Cien años de soledad
2026 (13th)	(Mexico) Paulina Gaitán	Serafina Baladro	The Dead Girls	Las muertas
2026 (13th)	(Spain) Candela Peña	Nat	Rage	Furia
2026 (13th)	(Spain) Carla Quílez	Mar	Jakarta	
2026 (13th)	(Argentina) Griselda Siciliani	Victoria Mori	Envious	Envidiosa
