= Frate =

Frate is a surname. Notable people with the surname include:

- Flora Frate (born 1983), Italian politician
- Marisa Del Frate (1931–2015), Italian singer, actress and television personality
- Renato Del Frate (1910–1962), Italian cinematographer
- Vitória Frate (born 1986), Brazilian actress
