= Cidade Baixa (disambiguation) =

Cidade Baixa (English: Lower City) may refer to:

- Cidade Baixa, the Portuguese-language title of Lower City, a 2005 Brazilian film
- Cidade Baixa, Rio Grande do Sul, a neighbourhood in Porto Alegre, Brazil
- Cidade Baixa, the lower half of the city of Salvador, Bahia in Brazil

== See also ==
Lower City (disambiguation)
