= Alexandre Rodrigues (actor) =

Brazilian actor (born 1983)

- Born: May 21, 1983 (age 43); Rio de Janeiro, Brazil
- Occupations: Actor, model
- Years active: 2000-present

Alexandre Rodrigues (born May 21, 1983) is a Brazilian actor. He is best known for playing the part of Buscapé (Rocket), the narrator and protagonist in the 2002 Brazilian film City of God.

In 2018, it was revealed that Rodrigues had started driving for Uber, which prompted discussions about economic mobility and equality of opportunity in Brazil.

== Filmography ==
=== Film ===
Year	Title	Role	Notes	Ref
2002	Cidade de Deus	Buscapé		
2003	Bala Perdida	Assaltante	Short film	
2005	Cafundó	Natalino (adult)		
2006	Memórias da Chibata	João Cândido	Short film	
2006	Proibido Proibir	Leon		
2011	Arsênio Godard's End	Ubiratã		
2013	Anita e Garibaldi	Jacinto		
2018	Christabel	Noivo, Fiancé		
2018	E.A.S.: Esquadrão Antissequestro			
2022	Abestalhados 2	Alexandre Rodrigues		

=== Television ===
Year	Title	Role	Notes	Ref
2000	Brava Gente	Vapor #2	Acting debut	
2003	Cidade dos Homens	Alex		
2004	Cabocla	Zaqueu		
2006	Little Missy	Bentinho		
2007	Antônia	Wellington		
2008	Tiempo final	Julian		
2008	Alice	Júnior		
2009	Paradise City	Tobi		
2010	Written in the Stars	Seth		
2012	Amor Eterno Amor	Seth		
2013	Joia Rara	Josué		
2016	Total Dreamer	Garoto na praia		
2017	The Other Side of Paradise	Valdo		
2021	Aruanas	Jociel		
2022	Joint Venture	Padre Clemente		
2024	Above Justice	Diuzinho		
2024	City of God: The Fight Rages On	Buscapé		

== Awards and nominations ==
Year	Ceremony	Category	Work nominated	Result
2024	Prêmio F5	Best Performance In a Series or Miniseries	City of God: The Fight Rages On	Nominated
2024	Prêmio Potências	Actor Of the Year	City of God: The Fight Rages On	Nominated
2025	Platino Awards	Best Series Actor	City of God: The Fight Rages On	Pending
