= Lower City (disambiguation) =

Lower City (Portuguese: Cidade Baixa) is a 2005 film by Brazilian director Sérgio Machado.

Lower City may also refer to:

- Lower City, Connecticut, an unincorporated community in Litchfield County, Connecticut
- The lower city or lower town of various town, notably Carcassonne, calquing French ville basse or basse-ville
- Lower City Mills, Perth, Scotland
- Neecha Nagar (lit. 'Lower City'), a 1946 Indian film by Chetan Anand

== See also ==
- Cidade Baixa (disambiguation)
