= Thiago Martins (actor) =

Brazilian actor and singer-songwriter (born 1988)

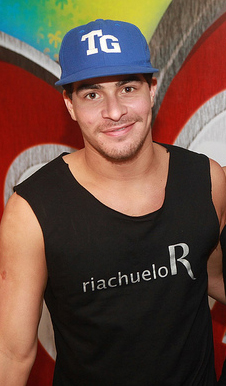
- Martins in 2013
- Born: Thiago dos Santos Martins; 19 September 1988 (age 37); Rio de Janeiro, Brazil
- Occupations: actor; singer-songwriter
- Years active: 1999–present

Thiago dos Santos Martins (born 19 September 1988) is a Brazilian actor and singer-songwriter.

== Career ==
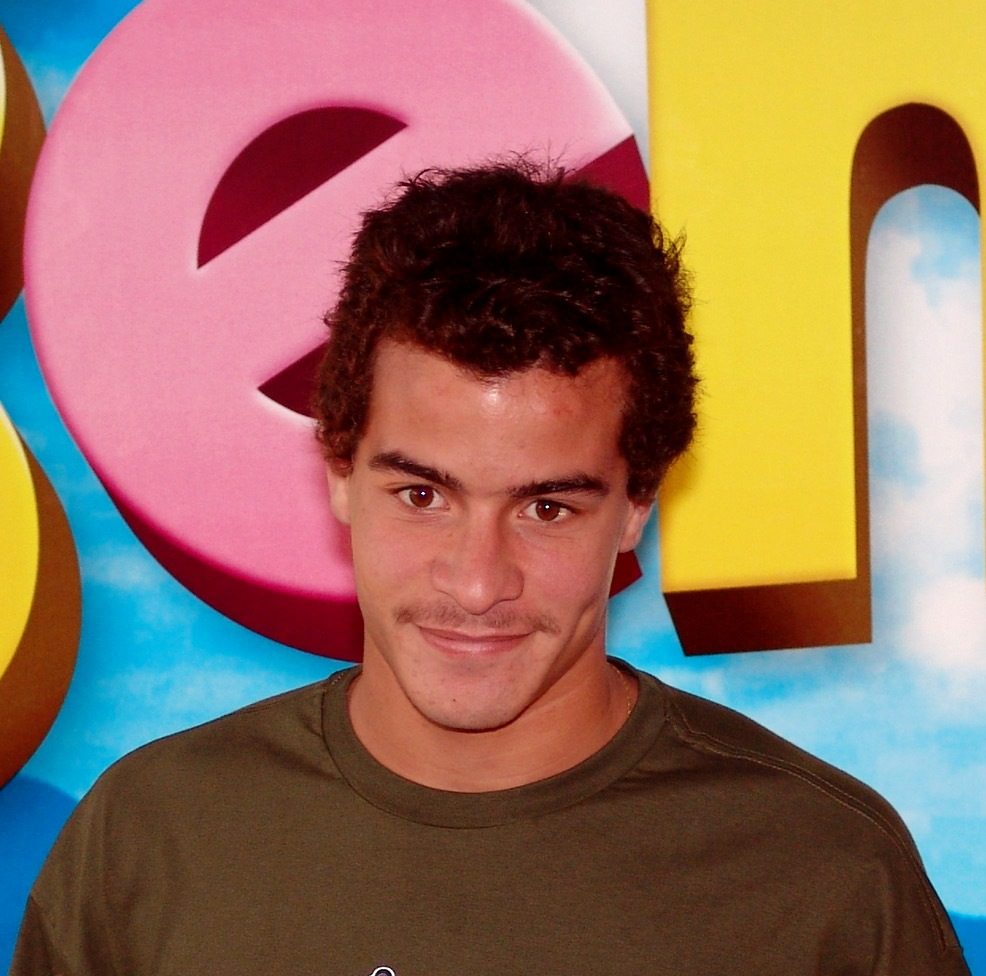
Martins in 2008

Martins was born on 19 September 1988 in Vidigal, a neighborhood of Rio de Janeiro. He had a difficult childhood, living with her mother and a brother in conditions of extreme poverty after his father abandoned the family. Martins found a male role model in his older brother Carlos André, who nearly died after being shot in the favela they lived in in 2002. An avid fan of football, Martins trained with a team in Portugal and hoped to pursue a professional career in football when he was called for an important job as an actor: the 2004 telenovela Da Cor do Pecado.

While he had started an acting career in theater in 1998, Martins got his first role in television at a Christmas special by Xuxa in 1999. From that moment his career opportunities increased, appearing in the highly acclaimed Brazilian film City of God (2002) and television series like Cidade dos Homens (2002) and Da Cor do Pecado (2004). After the success of his initial career, Martins continued working in important productions, including Belíssima, Desejo Proibido, Insensato Coração, Avenida Brasil, Flor do Caribe, Império, Babilônia, Pega Pega, and Amor de Mãe. In the 2020s, Martins has taken part in the TV series City of God: The Fight Rages On and the telenovelas Família é Tudo and Vale Tudo.

In cinema, aside from City of God, others of Martins' credits include Xuxa Gêmeas (2006), Once Upon a Time in Rio (2008), Flordelis: Basta uma Palavra para Mudar (2009), The Silver Cliff (2011) and City of God – 10 Years Later (2013).

== Personal life ==
Martins has been in a relationship with several well-known Brazilian actresses, including Roberta Rodrigues, Fernanda Paes Leme, Paloma Bernardi, and model Talita Nogueira.

== Selected roles ==
Year	Title	Role	Notes
1999	Planeta Xuxa	Guest	First TV appearance
2002	Cidade dos Homens		TV show
2002	City of God	Lampião	Major Brazilian production, epic crime film
2003	María, Mãe do Filho de Deus	John the Apostle	
2004	Da Cor do Pecado	Sal	Major television production
2005–2006	Belíssima	Tadeu Rocha	
2006	Xuxa Gêmeas	Tigre	Romantic comedy children's film
2007	Toma Lá, Dá Cá	Marcinho	
2007–2008	Desejo Proibido	Lídio	
2008	Once Upon a Time in Rio	Dé	Romantic drama film
2009	Flordelis: Basta uma Palavra para Mudar	Pedro Werneck	Biographical drama film
2011	The Silver Cliff	Nassir	Drama film
2011	Insensato Coração	Vinícius Amaral	Telenovela
2012	Avenida Brasil	Leandro	Major television production
2012	Louco por Elas	Dudu	TV sitcom
2013	Flor do Caribe	Rodrigo	
2013	City of God – 10 Years Later	–	Documentary film
2014	Império	Evaldo	
2015	Babilônia	Diogo Rocha	
2016	A Lei do Amor	Young Tião	
2017–2018	Pega Pega	Júlio	
2019–2021	Amor de Mãe	Ryan	
2024	Família é Tudo	Júpiter Mancini	
2024	City of God: The Fight Rages On	Bradock	TV series
2025	Vale Tudo	Vasco	
