= Paulina de la Mora =

Fictional character in the Netflix television series The House of Flowers

- The House of Flowers character
- Paulina de la Mora in the first episode
- First appearance: "NARCISSUS (symb. lies)" (2018)
- Last appearance: "LAUREL (symb. glory)" (2020)
- Created by: Manolo Caro
- Portrayed by: Cecilia Suárez

In-universe information
- Full name: Paulina de la Mora Aguirre
- Nicknames: Pau; Julieta
- Gender: Female
- Occupation: Business director
- Nationality: Mexican

Paulina de la Mora is a fictional character in the Netflix television series The House of Flowers, appearing in every episode and portrayed by Mexican actress Cecilia Suárez. The eldest daughter of the de la Mora family, she manages both her parents' businesses, a floristry shop and cabaret; being the eldest by several years, she also takes care of her siblings. She was once married to José María Riquelme before she transitioned, but reunites with the now María José after her father, Ernesto, is arrested. The couple have a teenage son, Bruno, and wed again in the series finale. The other main story for Paulina is learning about her biological father, after she finds out in season one that her parents married when her mother, Virginia, was already pregnant.

The character is notable for her distinctive style of speech and near-universal acclaim. Her statement fashion has also been prominently discussed. Suárez has received two Best Actress Platino Awards for the role. She became the lead in season two after the departure of Verónica Castro as Virginia.

Vogue España described Paulina as the best TV character of 2018, saying that Suárez's acting is the best they have seen in a long time, and that she will go down in television history. The character is described as a Mexican pop icon.

== Development ==
Cecilia Suárez, who plays Paulina de la Mora, is a frequent collaborator with the show's creator, Manolo Caro, and had acted in all but one of his previous projects. Paulina is a main character in the show, but in season one was second to the central character of Virginia, portrayed by Verónica Castro. Castro left before the show was renewed, and has given conflicting explanations as to why. (Note: See the Development section of the season 2 article.) For the second season, reviewers saw that "the closest thing the [show] has to a central character now" was Paulina, who steps up to take control of things and who was already a fan favorite; Rodrigo Munizaga speculated that Castro could have felt "overshadowed" by Suárez in the first season. In August 2018, El País described Paulina as a "heart stealer" and, in 2019, Vogue wrote that Suárez was "the new queen of the telenovela" because of the role.

Suárez was injured in the 2017 Puebla earthquake, which happened during filming; production was halted but she could not return to set for a month after production resumed. Though the character became very popular among fans, Suárez has dismissed claims that Paulina may have a spin-off, saying that she does not think Caro would do that, and that the character belongs in the story of the show.

== Characterization ==
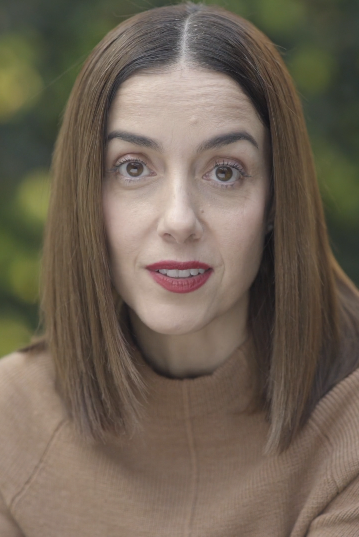
Cecilia Suárez portrays Paulina de la Mora.

Caro has said that he thought Paulina would be "polarizing" when he wrote her, that people would either love her or hate her, not expecting her to be as popular as she was received; for this reason he quickly wrote Suárez a very different role in their 2018 film Perfect Strangers, so both creator and actress could have some mental space from the character in case she was disliked. The character is said to have "a personality that justifies going from drama to involuntary comedy", which has been assessed as a perfect fit for the style of the show. The concept of second chances is the "backbone" of Paulina's character, according to Suárez, who said that Caro concerned himself with this concept through the first two seasons.

Suárez describes Paulina as very loyal, being supportive of her family even when they are hit by scandals and their image ruined. Capelo writes that "Paulina is the classic daddy's girl who grows up in a patrician family", but also acts as the bearer of woes and is there to help them deal with social appearance issues. Cobb says that the character is the "ever-loyal daughter" and a "standout tyrant" in the sense that she goes to extreme lengths to defend her family, "and she never even smudges her flawless red lipstick while she's doing it."

Paulina is bisexual and a feminist. Garrán writes that Paulina "appears conservative but enjoys forming bonds with drag queens and prisoners", an attribute that Suárez compares against the "contradiction" of the conservative Mexico that refuses to accept its transgressive side yet still has Juan Gabriel as one of its most beloved figures. Suárez notes that Paulina is a modern character who, despite her background, does not discriminate against people no matter their skin color, sexuality, or social class – according to fan messages, this is a main reason why people connect with and like her. Ramírez for El País compared Paulina to characters like Elle Woods, Cher Horowitz, and Hilary Banks, though Paulina starts off much different to other 'heiresses' in that her character is based more in "sarcasm, intelligence, the spirit of self-improvement and progressive thinking" and not in the stereotypical portrayal of the daddy's girl.

== Voice ==
Paulina de la Mora speaking
A recording of Paulina saying "Pero estoy enganchadísima con el Tafil, oye" in her distinctive style. After spawning Internet memes, Paulina's voice was at the center of marketing material for the show's second season.

The character is known for her distinctive voice, which Marie Claire described as "deliberate, almost stuttery, and a little nasal". Paco León, who plays Paulina's partner, trans woman María José Riquelme, said that when he arrived on set in Mexico after filming had begun and heard Suárez speak in character as Paulina for the first time, he initially thought the cast was playing a prank on him.

Suárez has discussed Paulina's voice. She said that it was hard for her to develop her character's identity, trying out different voices alone before filming and not finding the right fit. The distinctive voice she is known for was improvisation Suárez tried during filming, on the fourth shoot day during the scene where Paulina and Bruno are covering up Roberta's wake at the funeral home. Caro approved of the voice and pushed Suárez to keep exaggerating it further after they decided together to use it. Some of the early scenes had to have the sound re-recorded to keep Paulina's speech consistent. Suárez has hinted that she and Caro devised a backstory for Paulina's voice between themselves, adding that they have some friends who do speak similarly and so using it is "a way to honor them".

The character's languorous speech pattern, which is often slowed down even further to enunciate syllable by syllable, became popular among viewers, spawning the '#PaulinaDeLaMoraChallenge' on social media. In the challenge, fans upload videos where they imitate Paulina's voice, often with some of the character's lines. The challenge was started by Mexican actor Roberto Carlo, with the stars of Cable Girls being the first to take it up. When Netflix and Suárez responded with their own version of the challenge on Twitter, it became a trending event on the website, based on popularity and coverage; at this point, there were over 69,000 fan videos of the challenge. The response to the challenge is one of the only times that Suárez has spoken in Paulina's voice outside of the show. She initially said Netflix restricted her from using the voice, but clarified this as being "a suggestion" that she follows to not break the magic of the fiction. Scholar Paul Julian Smith has noted that videos of Paulina's memorable lines recorded from the show have been uploaded to the Internet by fans and received hundreds of thousands of views.

Several media outlets, including the BBC, have suggested that Paulina's slow speech is a result of regularly taking the anti-anxiety medication Tafil (known in the United States as Xanax) because of an episode where the character says that she is addicted to it. Slow speech is a side effect of the drug. However, the article noted that the character's voice and Tafil use are creatively coincidental as they were conceived of separately during the show's development.

In terms of characterization, Verónica Calderón of Vogue writes that Paulina's voice is demarcating of the fresa ('yuppie', 'posh') stereotype that her character plays with. She says that similar types of speech are not unusual in upper-class neighborhoods like Las Lomas, suggesting that it could be used as part of the show's socioeconomic commentary. Clarín's Pablo Raimondi said that the style of diction establishes her as a "daddy's girl" and a character who can know everyone's secrets because it is a stamp of such characterization.

Paulina's voice became the focus of the show's marketing for season two, in a series of videos. The first marketing videos for season two were released in August 2019: on August 8, a video of Paulina leaving a threatening voicemail for the character Diego, mimicking the one in Taken, was released, which was followed on August 12 with a video showing a voice note left in the siblings' WhatsApp chat by Paulina about their mother's funeral. On October 2, another marketing video, also focused on Paulina speaking, was released. In it, the character makes an ASMR video recap of the show.

== Fashion ==
Alondra Piedra of Wapa wrote that Paulina is also known for her fashion, which she describes as fabulous, and Fernanda Pérez Sánchez of Vogue said that she is "a benchmark of absolute style" and a "fashion icon". Mexican stylist Natalia Seligson was the show's costume designer; she "wanted to bet on fresh and elegant designs with a formal but modern style", which Trendencias says "perfectly embodies Paulina".

Trendencias analyzed Paulina's fashion, noting that it was suitable for the business world but still highly fashionable, showing Paulina to be a busy working woman who is still concerned about appearances, also saying she has a more European style. They said that Paulina's fashion had an impact on viewers and that she first stole the show in episode one because of her unusual pink outfit. Pérez Sánchez discussed this outfit, how Paulina was introduced and showing that she had style straight away. The outfit is a loose blouse and palazzo pants in a monochrome pink that is bold in color and for the event, as women may not often wear pants to a formal garden party.

The Trendencias review noted that a lot of Paulina's outfits are more the style of a working woman, in plain and neutral colors and with many blazers. She also has more couture outfits in different colors, but these are made from a few versatile pieces combined in different ways. Trendencias added that while her clothes are loose, they have a feminine cut, and that she wears flat shoes on all but one occasion. Ramírez agreed that Paulina has a professional and easy wardrobe, and said that it was "minimalist" but that there is a focus on her well-placed accessories, with Pérez Sánchez noticing that when Paulina dressed in blouses and shirts, they were always buttoned all the way up, which she sees as a personal mark of Paulina in the outfits. Noting that Paulina's wardrobe is minimal and sophisticated, Piedra looked at certain outfits and trends; she reported that Paulina often wore pants that start at the waist, something that "stylizes the figure", and a versatile selection of sweaters and blazers. Elsa López of Glamour opined that Paulina's outfits stand out more because of the simplicity, and that her simple and minimalistic taste "perfectly reflects her personality" in that it is to-the-point as well as bold where she is not scared to express herself.

Juanra López of El Confidencial also reported on Paulina's style, noting that she wears her hair in a functional low bun most of the time, and that her make-up is minimal and is "not intended to emphasize her sexuality". López wrote that this style is part of her identity as a high-class woman, and also contrasts with the appearance of María José, which is furthered by Paulina's more work-style fashion compared to María José's haute couture. Ramírez also thought that Paulina's outfits make her seem cultured, but elaborated that "her style relaxes in accordance with her character development".

== Appearances ==
In season one, Paulina starts as the family's main organizer, but is taken out of her role at the florist's 'La Casa de las Flores' when her mother, Virginia, realizes that she's been keeping all of her father Ernesto's dirty secrets and helping him to run a side business at a cabaret also called 'La Casa de las Flores'. After Ernesto is arrested, Paulina visits him more than the rest of the family does and works the hardest to get him out, despite knowing that he is not her biological father—she is told that her former psychiatrist Dr. Salomón Cohén is her father. She even calls her ex-husband who transitioned to be a woman, María José Riquelme, to be the family lawyer. The two grow close again, especially with the family being more accepting of María José after Paulina's brother Julián comes out as bisexual, and they work together to track down their teenage son Bruno when he goes camping without telling anyone. She is given the final amount of money to pay off her father's debts and free him by Dr. Cohén, but the safe gets robbed. She also agrees to send Bruno to Madrid with María José. The florist's anniversary party, which Virginia did not want to hold without all the family together, goes ahead at the end of the season. Virginia reveals she sold the florist's to bail out Ernesto for the party, then cuts it short and tells Paulina to go after her own family, which she does, intercepting them at the airport and asking to try again.

The second season is set a year later, after Virginia has died of cancer. At Virginia's funeral, depicted in a short film special, Paulina has a breakdown over her death and also snaps at her mother's fake friends and the hypocrites that judged her brother and partner when they each came out; they're all enjoying the funeral like a party. Paulina is living in Madrid with María José, Bruno, and María José's crazy sister Purificación at the start of the second season. When Virginia's will is challenged, she returns to Mexico to whip her family back in order. She also vows revenge on the family accountant and Julián's partner, Diego, who she suspects stole the money from the safe. To honor her mother's memory, she wants to buy back the florist's, and plans to do this by making the cabaret successful again. She also meets a Catalan man called Alejo, who was a friend to Virginia when she was dying and claims she asked him to check on her children; she has an affair with him. At the cabaret, she organizes with Julián's escort friends to open back rooms for prostitution to raise money more quickly. She then reports this, hoping to get Diego arrested; after emotional conversations with María José, and realizing that Diego may have been a good friend to Virginia during her last days while Alejo is the one who challenged the will, she hands herself in to the police.

Season three begins at the moment season two ended, showing Paulina being taken to her prison cell. In prison, she meets a woman called Chiva, who claims to know more about her family's dark history. As an upper-class woman in for white-collar crime, lawyers assure Paulina, María José, and Alejo that she will be quickly released with the right amount of money. Though Purificación tries to thwart this and keep her locked up, María José returns to Mexico to get her out. Paulina get jealous when María José starts dating lawyer Kim, but they can't stay away from each other, especially when Kim turns out to be manipulative and using trans people for demonstrative purposes. Purificación is committed to a hospital because of her delusions, and the couple work out the flaws in their relationship to finally heal. They have been trying to work out who Chiva is, and what tragedies happened in the family 40 years ago. They discover the story of Pato, Virginia's best friend who was going to testify in support of Chiva, but was murdered for being gay. Ernesto tells Paulina that Pato was her real father. They manage to get Chiva out of jail, and she warns them about their dictatorial grandmother Victoria, who has moved back in. Victoria, who turns dangerously vengeful when she does not get her way, is trying to murder family maid Delia when they arrive at the house, but she is accidentally pushed down the stairs by Delia – Paulina asks the local police, with whom she's friendly, to not question the accident. On the way to the station, she proposes to María José, who accepts. In the series finale, the couple have their wedding, though Purificación does break out to try and kill Paulina, she is stopped by the spirit of Virginia.

== Critical response ==
And here she entered, Cecilia Suárez, a whirlwind discovered in La casa de las flores who took everything. She was the star. Her Paulina de la Mora is a revelation, a poster girl buried to the eyebrows in meds who, however, was the most modern and determined character in the story.

— Javier Zurro

Cecilia Suárez has been repeatedly singled out and praised for her performance as Paulina. (Note: From multiple international sources, including:) Pavel Gaona suggests that Suárez had to "leave her comfort zone" to play Paulina, and says this was successful. In an otherwise scathing review of the show where he described other characters and performances as "lacking" and "pretentious", Gaona made exception of Suárez and Paulina, giving both high praise.

Some critical reviews have looked at the relationship of the characters of Paulina and Virginia in relation to the show's drama. Relating to the first season, Cobb says that their characterization and the melodrama work well together. After Virginia dies between seasons 1 and 2, Esparza wrote that this was a mistake, explaining that the show's dynamic was best when Virginia and Paulina could play off each other.

Despite the more negative critical response to season two overall, (Note: See the Critical reception section of the series' article) reviews were still mostly positive towards Paulina. Relating to the season being seen as worse than the first, Carlos writes that it is "saved by the character of Paulina". Esparza says that many of the characters became more like caricatures, "except for Cecilia Suárez, Paco de León and also Norma Angélica" [sic]. Zurro, who had a bad view of all aspects of the season, added that "of course, Paulina de la Mora is still there, and she and Cecilia Suárez are still the rulers of the series". Opposing these, Munizaga criticized the character, saying that Paulina's motivations in the season are "absurd", though noting that the other characters' are worse.

The third season was very positively received, and Paulina and Suárez continued to receive praise. Puentes wrote that no matter what "Paulina continues to not disappoint", with Vargas saying that "Paulina (Cecilia Suárez, always brilliant) stands out like a band leader while some [like her siblings] do not". At the start of the final season, when Paulina is in prison, Puentes specifically commends the portrayal, writing that "Paulina continues to be Paulina despite not wearing divine outfits or regularly going to a stylist".

Though popular with the public, some critics have mixed views on Paulina's voice. Vinícius Nader of Correio Braziliense wrote that it is "very forced and [has an] artificial rhythm", not finding it pleasant, but Manuel Betancourt of Remezcla described it as "deliciously languid", seeing it as a starring feature of her character.

=== Awards ===
Cecilia Suárez co-hosted the 2019 Platino Awards, the main international film and television awards for Ibero-American media. Here, the show was nominated in two categories. Suárez was nominated as Best Actress in a Miniseries or TV Series for the role of Paulina, which she won. She won the same award in 2020.

== Sources ==
- "Netflix prohíbe a Cecilia Suárez, de 'La Casa de las Flores', hablar como su personaje fuera de la serie" [Netflix prohibits Cecilia Suárez, from 'La Casa de las Flores', from speaking like her character outside of the show]. 20minutos (in Spanish). August 27, 2018. Archived from the original on November 7, 2019.
- Aguilar, Carlos (August 24, 2018). "The Most Hilarious Memes About Netflix's Hit Melodrama 'La Casa de la Flores'". Remezcla. Archived from the original on June 6, 2019.
- Aguilar, Carlos (January 10, 2019). "Cecilia Suárez & Manolo Caro on their Two Decades of Friendship and Creative Collaboration". Remezcla. Archived from the original on July 11, 2019.
- Alba, María (April 24, 2020). "'La casa de las flores': el culebrón de Netflix se redime en la tercera temporada de los pecados de la segunda" ['La casa de las flores': the Netflix telenovela redeems itself in the third season from the sins of the second]. Espinof (in Spanish). Archived from the original on April 26, 2020.
- Audrey (September 13, 2018). "Analizamos (a fondo) el estilo de Paulina de la Mora: la estrella innegable de La Casa de las Flores" [We analyze (in depth) the style of Paulina de la Mora: the undeniable star of La Casa de las Flores]. Trendencias (in Spanish). Archived from the original on November 9, 2019.
- BBC Mundo (August 14, 2018). "La Casa de las Flores: qué es el Tafil, el fármaco al que es adicta el personaje de Paulina de la Mora (y que produce cambios en el habla)" [La Casa de las Flores: what is Tafil, the drug that the character of Paulina de la Mora is addicted to (and that produces changes in speech)]. BBC Mundo (in Spanish). Archived from the original on November 29, 2019.
- Betancourt, Manuel (October 18, 2019). "Even Without Veronica Castro, 'La Casa de las Flores' Season 2 Is Still as Dysfunctional & Hilarious as Ever". Remezcla. Archived from the original on December 13, 2019.
- Calderón, Verónica (August 29, 2019). "¡Nueva ma-triar-ca! Regresa 'La casa de las flores' con su segunda temporada" [New mat-riar-chy! 'La casa de las flores' returns with its second season]. Vogue (in Spanish). Archived from the original on December 19, 2019.
- Campos, Edna (2018). "7 Reasons to Binge-Watch Netflix's La Casa de las Flores". PopSugar. Archived from the original on October 10, 2019.
- Capelo, María Eugenia (September 18, 2018). "Paulina Challenge, el desafío viral que surgió de un curioso personaje de la serie "La Casa de las Flores"" [Paulina Challenge, the viral challenge that came from a strange character in the show "La Casa de las Flores"]. Infobae (in European Spanish). Archived from the original on April 3, 2020.
- Cárdenas, Alejandro (October 22, 2018). "Cecilia Suárez, la primera mujer en recibir el Premio Cuervo Tradicional" [Cecilia Suárez, the first woman to receive the Premio Cuervo Tradicional]. El Sol de México (in Spanish). Archived from the original on April 10, 2020.
- Carlos, Alberto (October 21, 2019). "'La casa de las flores': la telenovela de Netflix vuelve con una temporada 2 aún más excéntrica que la anterior" ['La casa de las flores': the Netflix telenovela returns with a second season that's even more eccentric than before] (in Spanish). Archived from the original on November 9, 2019.
- Catenacci, José (August 20, 2018). "Conoce las curiosidades de 'La Casa de las Flores': La serie mexicana de Netflix de la que se está hablando" [Get to know curiosities about 'La Casa de las Flores': The Mexican Netflix series that everyone is talking about]. Guioteca (in Spanish). Archived from the original on November 5, 2019.
- Cobb, Kayla (August 22, 2018). "Netflix's House of Flowers Is the Mexican Desperate Housewives". Decider. Archived from the original on April 20, 2019.
- de la Fuente, Anna Marie (May 12, 2019). "Alfonso Cuaron's 'Roma' Sweeps 6th Premios Platino". Variety. Archived from the original on February 19, 2020.
- de la Fuente, Anna Marie (June 29, 2020). "Pedro Almodóvar's 'Pain and Glory' Sweeps 7th Platino Xcaret Awards". Variety. Archived from the original on February 17, 2022.
- Esparza, Kike (October 26, 2019). ""La casa de las flores 2" está entre azul y buenas noches; sí hace falta la Vero" ["La casa de las flores 2" is neither here nor there; it is missing Vero]. Rosa Distrito (in Spanish). Archived from the original on October 29, 2019.
- Espinosa, Guillermo (October 19, 2019). "Paco León y Cecilia Suárez, una pareja singular en 'La casa de las flores'" [Paco León and Cecilia Suárez, a unique couple in 'La casa de las flores']. Mujer Hoy (in Spanish). Archived from the original on November 17, 2019.
- Flor Zóttola, Maria (April 25, 2020). "¿Cayó en el cliché? La última entrega de "La Casa de las Flores" asombró a los fans por hacer esto" [Does it fall into cliché? The last outing of "La Casa de las Flores" amazed fans]. Minuto NQN (in Spanish). Archived from the original on April 27, 2020.
- Gaona, Pável (August 21, 2018). "'La Casa de las Flores' está haciendo que volvamos a engancharnos a las telenovelas" ['La Casa de las Flores' is getting us hooked on telenovelas again]. Vice (in Spanish). Archived from the original on November 3, 2019.
- Garrán, Daniel (October 16, 2019). "'La casa de las flores': las claves de la telenovela millennial" ['La casa de las flores': the keys to the millennial telenovela]. Cadena Ser (in Spanish). Archived from the original on November 12, 2019.
- González, Renata (September 19, 2018). "A un año del sismo, elenco de 'La casa de las flores' recuerda cómo vivió el 19S" [One year on, the cast of 'La casa de las flores' recall how they survived 19S]. Quién (in Spanish). Archived from the original on November 9, 2019.
- Infobae (April 23, 2020). "Las reacciones al final de "La Casa de las Flores": la serie de Manolo Caro reveló algunos secretos" [Reactions to the final of "La Casa de las Flores": Manolo Caro's series reveals more secrets] (in European Spanish). Archived from the original on April 27, 2020.
- Keller, Joel (August 14, 2018). "Stream It Or Skip It: 'The House Of Flowers' On Netflix, A Mexican Family Dramedy That Starts With A Suicide". Decider. Archived from the original on November 3, 2019.
- Lerman, Gabriel (August 20, 2018). "Cecilia Suárez: "Prefiero trabajar en mi idioma y en mi país"" [Cecilia Suárez: "I prefer to work in my language and in my country"]. Golden Globe Awards (in Spanish). Archived from the original on November 17, 2019.
- LezWatchTV. "Paulina de la Mora". Archived from the original on November 22, 2019.
- Lobo, Joanna (September 1, 2018). "The House of Flowers: Drama, in full bloom". India Today. Archived from the original on April 20, 2019.
- Lopez, David (August 17, 2018). "La Casa de las Flores: The Queer Novela You Need to Watch". Instinct. Archived from the original on December 23, 2018.
- López, Juanra (October 18, 2019a). "Cecilia Suárez: las claves de estilo de la gran (y viral) estrella de 'La casa de las flores'" [Cecilia Suárez: the keys to the great (and viral) star of 'La casa de las flores']. El Confidencial (in Spanish). Archived from the original on May 10, 2020.
- López, Elsa (October 21, 2019b). "Lecciones de moda que aprendimos de Paulina de la Mora en 'La Casa de las Flores'" [Fashion lessons we learned from Paulina de la Mora in 'La Casa de las Flores']. Glamour Mexico (in Mexican Spanish). Archived from the original on December 17, 2019.
- Mancilla, Alejandro (2018). "Cecilia Suárez's Glory Days". American Way. Archived from the original on April 11, 2020.
- Mangal, Mayra (August 14, 2018). "Cecilia Suárez responde a la euforia por el Paulina de la Mora challenge: "Ya los vi haciendo sus chis-to-sa-das"" [Cecilia Suárez responds to the excitement for the Paulina de la Mora challenge: "I've been watching your little funnies"]. People en Español. Archived from the original on November 2, 2019.
- Marie Claire (August 24, 2018). "Paulina de la Mora y su voz, lo mejor de La casa de las flores" [Paulina de la Mora and her voice, the best of La casa de las flores] (in Spanish). Archived from the original on October 31, 2020.
- Marín, Verónica (August 31, 2018a). "'La casa de las flores' o por qué el personaje de Paulina de la Mora es el mejor de 2018" ['La casa de las flores' or why the character of Paulina de la Mora is the best thing in 2018]. Vogue (in Spanish). Archived from the original on November 22, 2019.
- Marín, Verónica (September 11, 2018b). "Los 5 mejores mo-men-tos de Paulina de la Mora en 'La casa de las flores'" [The 5 best Paulina de la Mora moments in 'La casa de las flores']. Vogue (in Spanish). Archived from the original on November 8, 2019.
- Merino, Javier (October 20, 2019). "En "La casa de las Flores", nadie se mete con los integrantes de la familia De la Mora" [In "La casa de las Flores", nobody messes with the De la Moras]. CNN (in European Spanish). Archived from the original on April 8, 2020.
- Merino, Javier; Huston-Crespo, Marysabel E. (April 23, 2020). "Cómo "La Casa de las Flores" llevó a Paulina de la Mora a ser un ícono pop mexicano" [How "La Casa de las Flores" brought Paulina de la Mora to be a Mexican pop icon]. CNN (in Spanish). Archived from the original on April 23, 2020.
- Munizaga, Rodrigo (October 18, 2019). "El descafeinado regreso de La casa de las flores" [The decaffeinated return to La casa de las flores]. La Tercera (in Spanish). Archived from the original on April 11, 2020.
- Nader, Vinícius (November 23, 2018). "La casa de las flores mescla drama e comédia como só os mexicanos sabem fazer!" [La casa de las flores mixes drama and comedy like only Mexicans can]. Próximo Capítulo (in Brazilian Portuguese). Archived from the original on November 3, 2019.
- Pérez Sánchez, Fernanda (April 29, 2020). "Hablemos de los looks de Paulina de la Mora en 'La Casa de las Flores'" [We talk about the looks of Paulina de la Mora in 'La Casa de las Flores']. Vogue Mexico (in Mexican Spanish).
- Piedra, Alondra (October 30, 2019). "Paulina de la Mora da cátedra de moda en "La Casa de las Flores"". wapa.pe (in Spanish). Archived from the original on May 21, 2020.
- Puentes, Patricia (2019). "La casa de las flores 2: Todo lo que necesitas saber de su nueva temporada" [La casa de las flores 2: All you need to know about the new season]. CNET en Español (in Spanish). Archived from the original on March 11, 2020.
- Puentes, Patricia (April 24, 2020). "La casa de las flores 3: Una temporada final nostálgica, atrevida y retro" [La casa de las flores 3: A nostalgic, bold and retro final season]. CNET (in Spanish). Archived from the original on April 29, 2020.
- Raimondi, Pablo (August 22, 2018). ""La casa de las flores": no es la típica lata mexicana" ["La casa de las flores": not your typical Mexican serving]. Clarín (in Spanish). Archived from the original on November 9, 2019.
- Ramírez, Noelia (August 23, 2018). "Cómo Paulina de la Mora se convirtió en el flechazo televisivo del verano" [How Paulina de la Mora became the television love of the summer]. S Moda EL PAÍS (in Spanish).
- Smith, Paul Julian (2019). "Netflix's The House of Flowers and the New Telenovela". Film Quarterly. 72 (3). University of California Press: 59–61. doi:10.1525/FQ.2019.72.3.59. ISSN 0015-1386. S2CID 239138406.
- Trome (August 20, 2018). "'La Casa de las Flores': Cecilia Suárez habla sobre el éxito de su personaje 'Paulina de La Mora' en la serie de Netflix" ['La Casa de las Flores': Cecilia Suárez talks about the success of her character 'Paulina de la Mora' in the Netflix series]. Trome (in Spanish).
- ""Pau-lina" res-pon-de al Paulina de la Mora Challenge" ["Pau-lina" res-ponds to the Paulina de la Mora Challenge]. 2018. Archived from the original on April 10, 2020 – via Twitter.
- Vargas, Esther (April 25, 2020). "La casa de las flores 3: Una declaratoria contra la maldita homofobia, la doble moral y el amor que siempre gana" [La casa de las flores 3: A cry against damned homophobia, double standards and love that always wins]. Perú.21 (in Spanish). Archived from the original on April 29, 2020.
- Velazquez, Alex (August 17, 2018). "The House of Flowers Is Netflix's New Family Dramedy With Multiple Queer and Trans Storylines". Into. Archived from the original on April 20, 2019.
- Zurro, Javier (October 19, 2019). "Que cierren 'La casa de las flores', el culebrón ya no tiene gracia" [How are they closing 'La casa de las flores', the telenovela that's no longer funny]. El Español (in Spanish). Archived from the original on December 9, 2019.
