= Noah's Ark (2024 film) =

2024 Brazilian-Indian animated film

- Promotional poster
- Portuguese: A Arca de Noé
- Directed by: Sérgio Machado; Alos di Leo
- Written by: Sérgio Machado
- Produced by: Walter Salles; Fabiano Gullane; Caio Gullane; O. Naresh Kumar
- Starring: Rodrigo Santoro; Marcelo Adnet; Alice Braga
- Cinematography: Márcio Nicolosi
- Edited by: Marcelo Junqueira
- Music by: Patrícia Portaro
- Production companies: Gullane; VideoFilmes; Globo Filmes; NIP; Symbiosys Technologies
- Distributed by: Cinema Management Group (Worldwide Sales); Imagem Filmes (Brazil)
- Release dates: January 5, 2024 (South Africa); November 7, 2024 (Brazil)
- Running time: 96 minutes
- Countries: Brazil; India
- Languages: English; Portuguese

Noah's Ark (Portuguese: A Arca de Noé) also known as Noah's Ark – A Musical Adventure is a 2024 animated musical adventure comedy film directed and written by Sérgio Machado with co-direction by Alos di Leo. The film is a Brazil-India co-production and was inspired by poems written by the musicians Vinicius de Moraes and Antônio Carlos Jobim as well and it follows two brother mice named Tom and Vini who are searching for good luck while sneaking into the Ark.

The film was first released in South Africa on January 5, 2024, and in Brazil on November 7, 2024.

== Plot ==
Tom and Vini are two mice who like to sing and play music. They eavesdrop on a conversation between Noah and God and realise that the Earth will be flooded. Tom and Vini try to board the ark that Noah and his family (Susanah, his granddaughter and Ruth, his wife) have prepared. But Noah refuses since both Tom and Vini are male. As all animal couples including Nina the female mouse are boarding the ship, Vini leaves despite Tom's protests, so that his friend can be saved. Vini is saved from drowning by Alfonso the Mexican cockroach and his insect crew sailing on a small boat.

The lion Baruk takes over the animal compartment with the help of several predators including a grizzly bear, a gorilla (the only herbivore), a jaguar, two hyenas and two rattlesnakes. He bullies the other animals particularly the mice. During the voyage, Baruk and his gang cause a hole in the animal compartment, which allows Vini, Alfonso and the insects to enter the ship. Noah and his family repair the damaged hole.

After the rain stops, Noah sends Kilgore the swallow and Sonya the dove to search for dry land. They are aided by a pink humpback whale. Unwilling to take Baruk's bullying anymore, Tom and Vini propose a singing competition, with the winner leading the animals. Determined to remain on top of the pecking order, Baruk kidnaps Nina and forces Tom and Vini to sing while he lip syncs. With the help of Alfonso and the insects, the mice manage to free Nina from her prison.

Susanah stalls Baruk long enough for Tom and Vini to join Baruk on the stage. A freed Nina exposes Baruk's cheating, causing all the animals to turn against him. Shortly later, Kilgore and Sonya return with news that they have discovered dry land. As the ark approaches land, it begins to disintegrate. The animals and humans work together to evacuate the occupants before the ark sinks. The mice and the insects join the other animals and humans in landing on the shore.

== Cast ==
- Rodrigo Santoro as Vini the Mouse
- Marcelo Adnet as Tom the Mouse
- Alice Braga as Nina the Mouse
- Keith Silverstein as Baruk the Lion / Bob / Kangaroo
- Ian James Corlett as Noah / Penguin
- Luis Bermudez as Kilgore the Swallow / God / Hyena #1 / Elephant / Guinea Pig / Woodpecker
- Laila McCann as Susana
- Debra Wilson as Ruth / Cow
- Christopher Corey Smith as Alfonso the Cockroach
- Triya Leong as Sonia the Dove / Babe
- Rachel Butera as Mrs. Ferret / Mr. Ferret / Rattlesnake #2 / Hyena #2 / Deer / Amy
- Misty Lee, as Whale / Sheyla / Turkey
- Rick Zieff as Rattlesnake #1 / Rhinoceros / Badger
- David Lodge as Gorilla / Peacock / Crocodile
- Karen Strassman as Lioness / Jaguar / Giraffe
- Mark Lewis as Billy Goat
- Bill Rogers as Grizzly Bear

== Reception ==
Tom and Vini have been presented as evocations of Tom Jobim and Vinicius de Moraes.

A French review found the film mediocre.
