= Roberta Rodrigues =

Brazilian actress

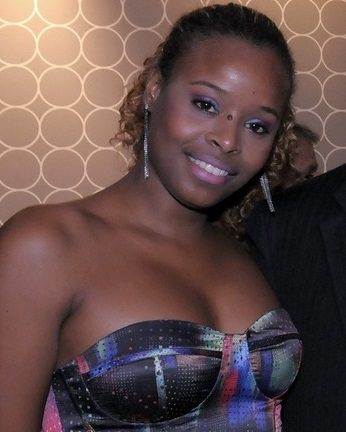
- Rodrigues in 2011
- Born: 20 October 1982 (age 43); Rio de Janeiro, Brazil
- Occupations: Actress, singer
- Years active: 2002–present

Roberta Rodrigues (born 20 October 1982) is a Brazilian actress. Born in Vidigal, Rio de Janeiro, Rodrigues started acting when she was 16 in a local theater group, Nós do Morro. In 2002, she debuted in City of God, and later was cast in several TV Globo's telenovelas.

She is also member of the hip hop music group Melanina Carioca composed of members of "Nós do Morro".

== Selected filmography ==
- City of God (2002)
- City of Men (2002–2005)
- Mulheres Apaixonadas (2003)
- Cabocla (2004)
- Paraíso Tropical (2007)
- Insensato Coração (2011)
- Salve Jorge (2012–2013)
- City of God – 10 Years Later (2013)
- Rio, I Love You (2014)
- A Regra do Jogo (2015-2016)
- Sob Pressão (2020)
- Nos Tempos do Imperador (2021-2022)
- City of God: The Fight Rages On (2024–present)

== Discography ==
- Melanina Carioca (Rodrigues is part of the hip hop group including actors Jonathan Haagensen and Marcello Melo Jr.)
