= Alice (Brazilian TV series) =

- Genre: Drama
- Created by: Karim Aïnouz; Sérgio Machado
- Directed by: Karim Aïnouz; Sérgio Machado
- Starring: Andréia Horta; Vinicius Zinn; Regina Braga; Denise Weinberg; Daniela Piepszyk
- Theme music composer: Instituto
- Composers: Rica Amabis, Instituto
- Country of origin: Brazil
- Original language: Portuguese
- No. of seasons: 1
- No. of episodes: 13 + 2 specials

Production
- Running time: 45 minutes
- Production company: Gullane Filmes

Original release
- Network: HBO
- Release: September 21, 2008 – November 27, 2010

Alice is an original series created for the Brazilian branch of the HBO Latin America. The series was produced by HBO's local partner, Gullane Filmes, and directed by Karim Aïnouz and Sérgio Machado. The series debuted in Latin America on September 21, 2008, with a season consisting of thirteen episodes, ending on December 14, 2008. In 2010, two special episodes were shown. One year later, the show was canceled by the channel.

The series stars Andréia Horta who plays Alice, a young woman who leaves her small town to live in São Paulo, where she meets several people who help her to better understand herself. The series is characterized by a multitude of characters, the arguments of introspection in the protagonist's inner journey and its realistic portrayal of the city and its inhabitants, showing examples of different lifestyles of many people in the metropolis.

Sergio Machado and Karim Aïnouz, who are also the creators and writers of the series, were responsible for the direction, although several episodes were directed by two guest directors.

== Overview ==
The series follows the story of Alice, a 25-year-old woman who comes from Palmas to São Paulo to receive a small inheritance from her father. Upon arriving in São Paulo, Alice meets a new world, where she makes new friends, living new experiences that will cause decisive changes in her life. Alice sinks into the excitement of the cosmopolitan and cultural landscape of the city of São Paulo.

== Episodes ==
The series consists of 15 episodes. 13 corresponding to the first season, and the other two were made as television films.

1. Pela toca do coelho
2. O tesouro de Alice
3. O retorno de Elvira Cipriani
4. No jardim das flores perdidas
5. Os peixinhos dourados de Dona Sumiko
6. O lado Escuro do espelho
7. Wonderland
8. A guerra de Alice
9. Em busca do ouro
10. Na cidade de Alice
11. A mil quilômetros por hora
12. Queda livre
13. À flor da pele

=== Special episodes ===
In 2010, two special episodes were shown. In them we find Alice, her friends and family two years after arriving in São Paulo. These episodes were shown on 21 and 28 November 2010.

1. O Primeiro Dia Do Resto Da Minha Vida
2. A Última Noite

== Characters ==
=== Main ===
- Alice (Andréia Horta)
- Dani (Luka Omoto)
- Nicolas (Vinicius Zinn)
- Luli (Regina Braga)
- Dora (Denise Weinberg)
- Regina Célia (Daniela Piepszyk)

=== Recurring ===
- Glícia (Walderez de Barros)
- Marcela (Gabrielle Lopez)
- Téo (Juliano Cazarré)
- Irislene (Carla Ribas)
- Henrique (Marat Descartes)
- Lorenzo (Eduardo Moscovis)
- Renata (Guta Ruiz)

== Soundtrack ==
The main theme of the series was composed by Instituto, a musical group that mixes typically Brazilian sounds such as samba, ballad and folk rhythms with dub beats, hip hop and electronic music.

1. Instituto & Irina Gatsalova - Wonderland (Main Theme)
2. 808 Sex - In the track
3. Fabio Góes - Sem mentira
4. Edu K feat Deize Tigrona - Sex-O-Matic
5. Instituto & Gui Amabis - City Lights
6. Hot Chip - Just Like We (Breakdown) (DFA Remix)
7. Estela Cassilatti - Al (4:43)
8. Estela Cassilatti - Meu Siêncio
9. Boss In Drama - All the Love (Telequete Wonderland)
10. 3 na Massa - Enladeirada (Tejo RMX)
11. Fabio Góes feat. CéU - Sun of your eyes
12. Instituto - Choro (3:17)
13. Fabio Góes - Sereno
14. Irina Gatsalova & Anvil FX - Latin Lover
15. Turbo Trio Part. Deize Tigrona, Bonde Do Role e Chernobyl - Ela tá na festa (Chernobyl RMX)
16. Gabbi - Till The Moment You Sleep
17. Curumin - Guerreiro
18. Turbo Trio - Genius 2099
19. Irina Gatsalova & Anvil FX - Punk It

== Broadcast ==
- Latin America – HBO
- Portugal – Fox Life
