= Once Upon a Time in Rio =

- Theatrical release poster
- Portuguese: Era uma Vez...
- Directed by: Breno Silveira
- Written by: Patrícia Andrade; Domingos de Oliveira
- Starring: Thiago Martins; Vitória Frate; Rocco Pitanga; Paulo César Grande; Cyria Coentro
- Music by: Maria Gadú
- Production companies: Conspiração Filmes; Globo Filmes; Lereby Produções
- Distributed by: Walt Disney Studios Sony Pictures Releasing do Brasil
- Release date: July 25, 2008
- Running time: 117 minutes
- Country: Brazil
- Language: Portuguese

Once Upon a Time in Rio (Portuguese: Era uma Vez...) is a Brazilian romantic drama film released in 2008 and directed by Breno Silveira, set in Rio de Janeiro. It was produced by Conspiração Filmes, co-produced by Globo Filmes and by Lereby Produções and distributed in Brazil by Walt Disney Studios Sony Pictures Releasing do Brasil.

== Plot ==
Dé (Thiago Martins) was born and raised at the Cantagalo slum, in Rio de Janeiro. As a child, he witnessed his brother being murdered by a local drug dealer due to a football-related fight. His other brother, Carlão (Rocco Pitanga), is banished from the slum and ends up arrested because of him. Willing to live an honest life, Dé gets a job at a kiosk at Ipanema beach. There, he meets Nina (Vitória Frate), a rich girl living in an apartment right in front of the kiosk. The two fall in love and begin to date. Initially, they keep their relationship as a secret because of her overprotective father Evandro (Paulo César Grande), but after he finds out, he ends up accepting it after much insistence by Nina.

Carlão manages to get out thanks to a deal he settled with the police and returns to Cantagalo to take it over and kill his brother's murderer. The dispute between crime gangs turns Cantagalo into a very dangerous place and Evandro forbids Nina from visiting Dé at the slum. Furthermore, he buys two tickets to Europe, willing to move out of Brazil with Nina. She pretends she accepted his offer, but secretly she plans to escape to Northeast Brazil with Dé.

Carlão throws a farewell party to the couple at Cantagalo. However, at that same night, cops and criminals come collect the money he owes them. Desperate, Carlão has Nina kidnapped in hopes of demanding a high ransom from Evandro. Evandro, however, has his contacts in the media publish pictures of Dé all over the news, believing him to be the kidnapper.

Dé goes seek help from Carlão, still unaware that he is behind the kidnapping. When the truth comes out, the two fight and Dé shoots Carlão in the chest. The drug lord regrets his actions and tells the couple to flee from Cantagalo. Fearing most won't believe Dé is innocent, they go straight to the kiosk to collect some money and buy tickets to Northeast. However, when they arrive at Ipanema, dozens of cops and reporters are waiting in front of her building and they rush to the kiosk for shelter. Nina suggests that Dé pretends to be peacefully releasing her and surrendering. The plan goes wrong when the police execute him in spite of him posing no threat. An infuriated Nina reacts by grabbing his gun and shooting randomly at the crowd, causing the cops to execute her, as well.

== Cast ==
- Thiago Martins as Dé
  - Rodrigo Costa as young Dé
- Vitória Frate as Nina
- Rocco Pitanga as Carlão
- Cyria Coentro as Bernadete
- Paulo César Grande as Evandro
- Luana Schneider as Cacau
- Felipe Adler as Ike
- Kikito as Café Frio
- Marcos Pitombo as Dudu
- Fernando Brito as Beto

== Critical reception ==
According to Reuters, the film "navigates between narrative and visual clichés -- such as excessive use of music and slow motion. What genuinely emerges is the talent of Thiago Martins, who manages to express veracity and emotion through his character."

Ronaldo Pelli, from G1, also criticized the movie for being cliché and considered it a prejudice that only Martins was allowed to talk about Cantagalo during a mid-credits commentary. He concluded by saying the movie is predictable and that "nothing happens" from the middle to the end. On the other hand, he praised the photography, the choice of Cantagalo as the filming location and the "good and correct acting" of Rocco Pitanga, Martins and Vitória Frate.
