= List of The House of Flowers characters =

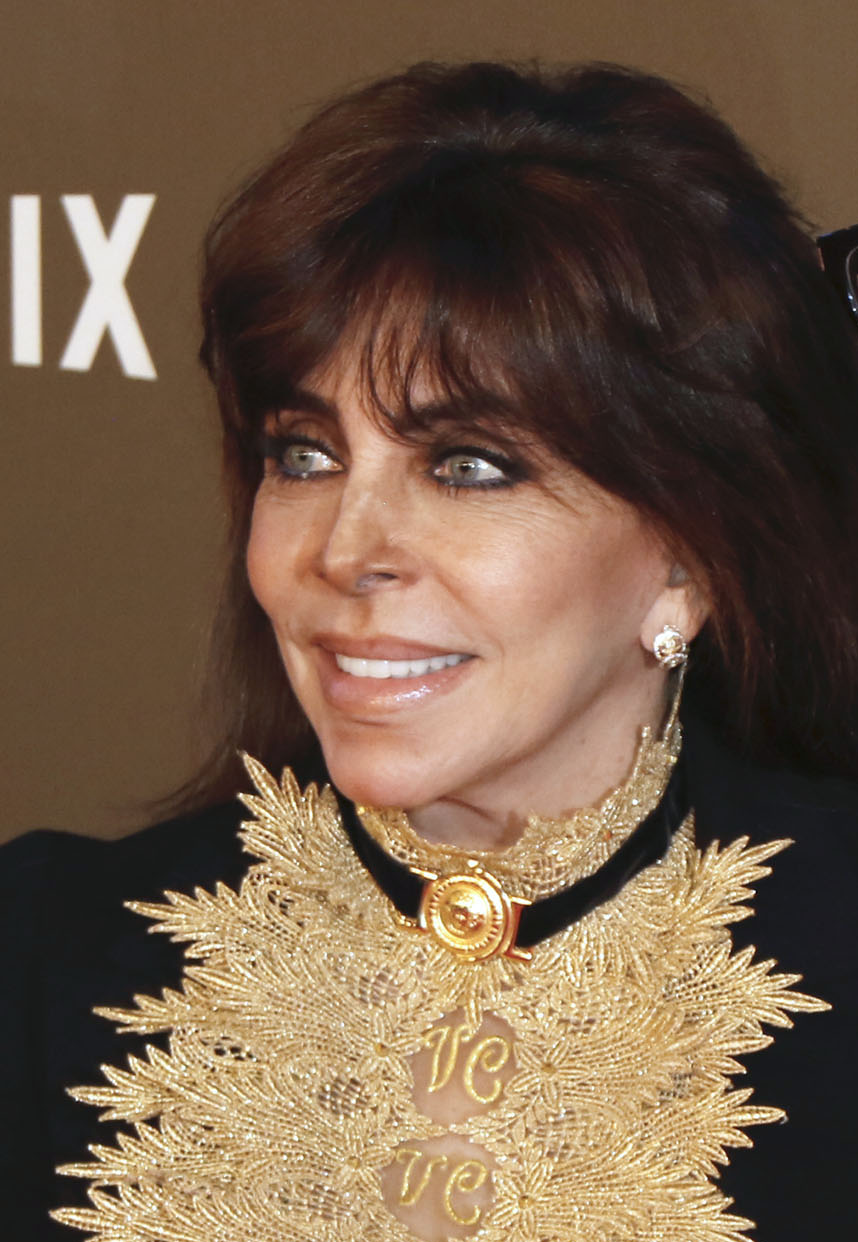
Verónica Castro

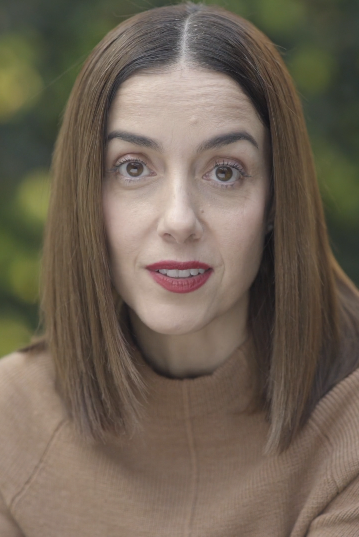
Cecilia Suárez

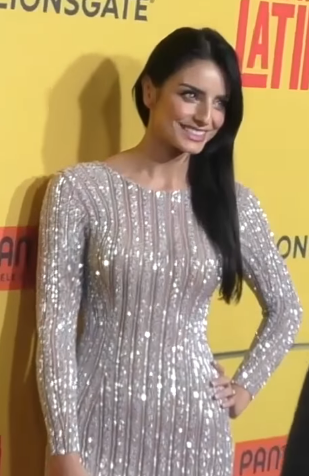
Aislinn Derbez

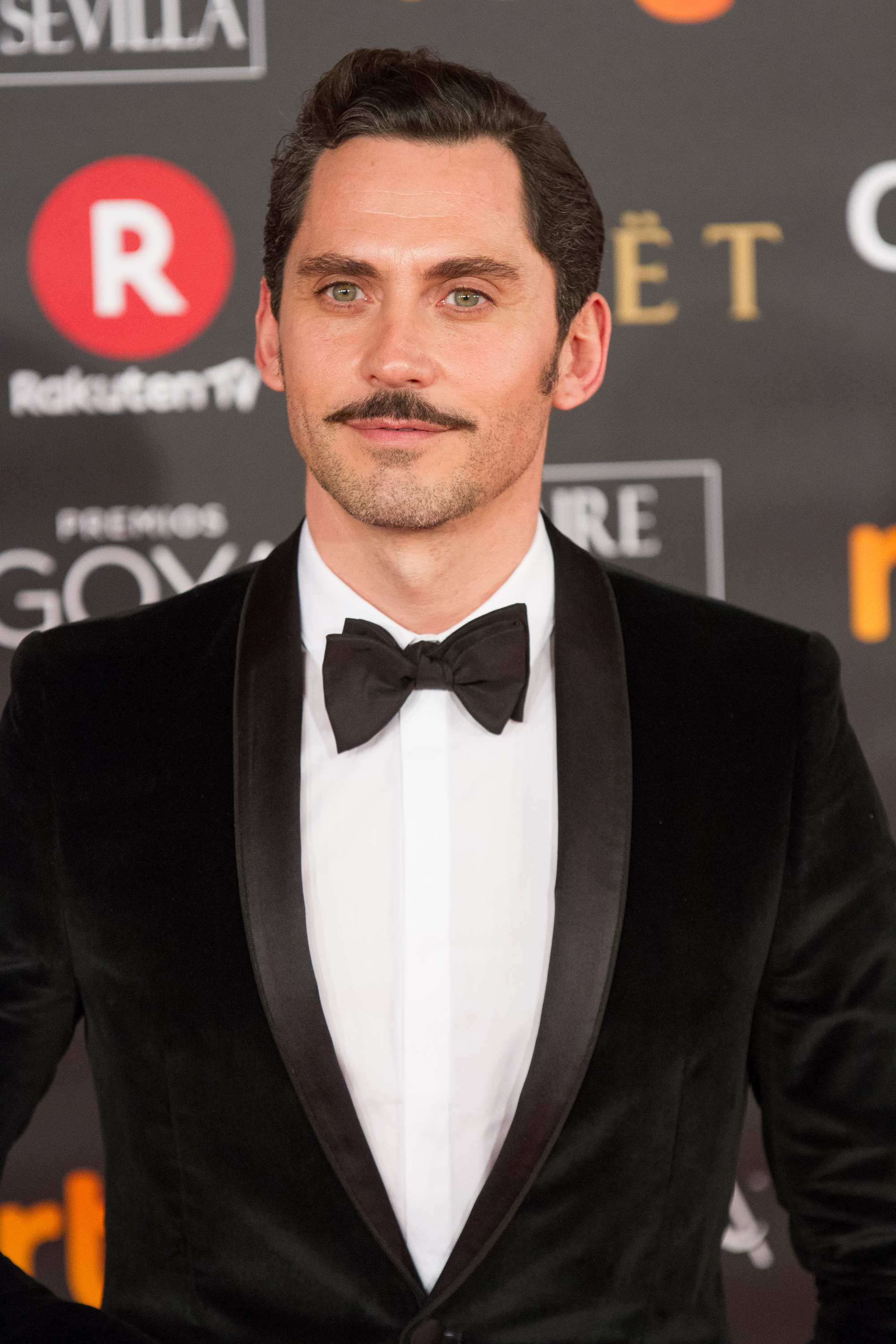
Paco León

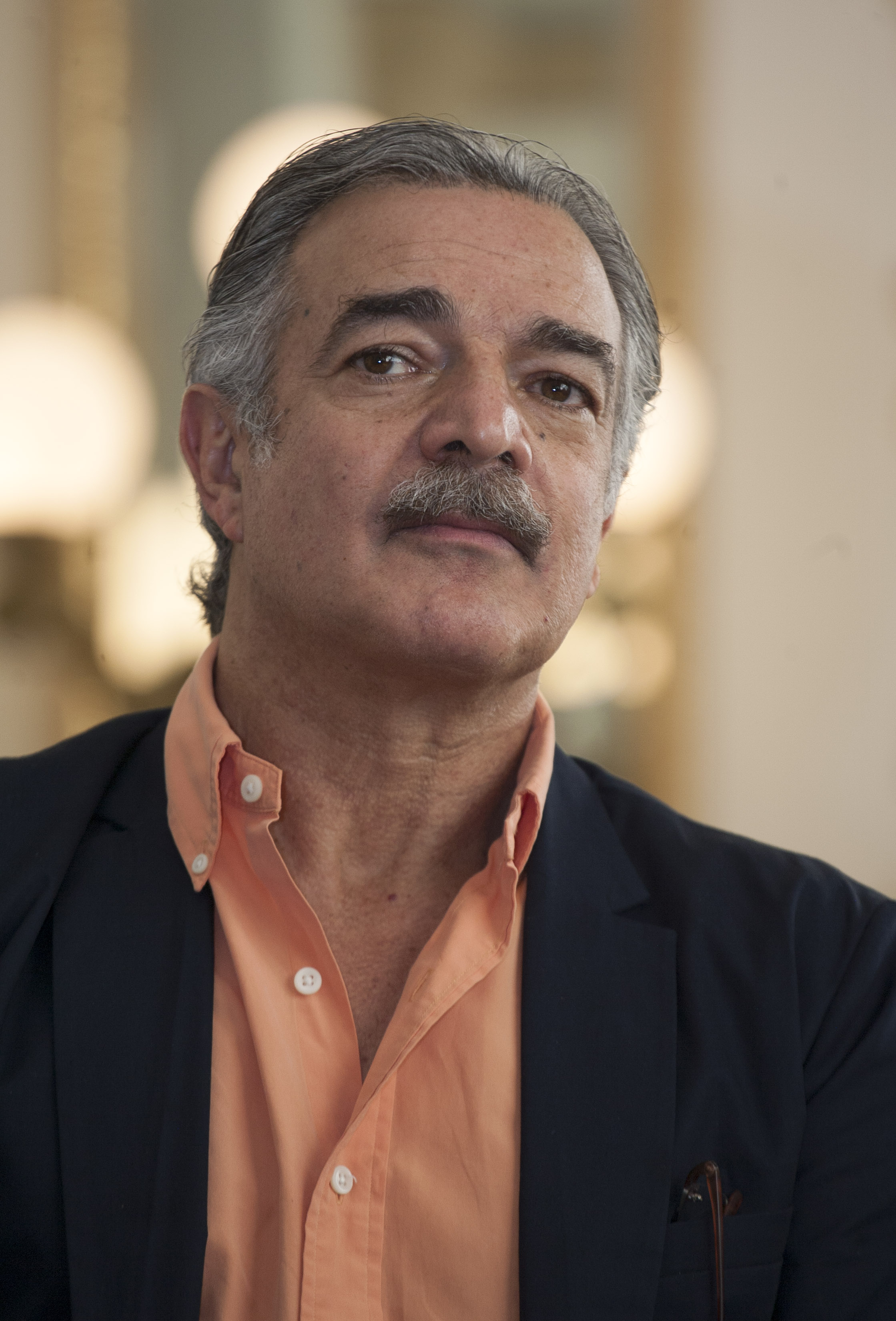
David Ostrosky

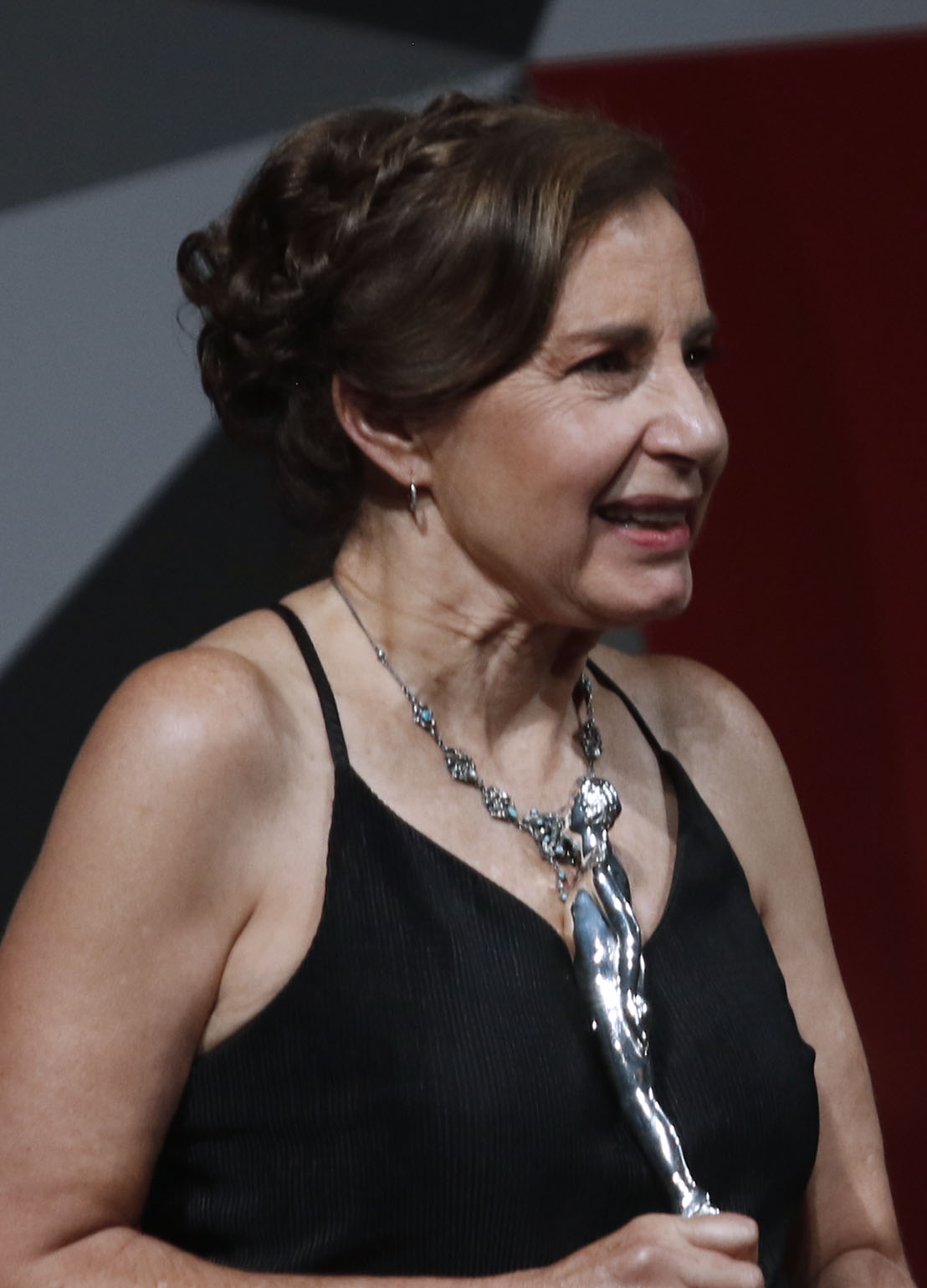
Verónica Langer

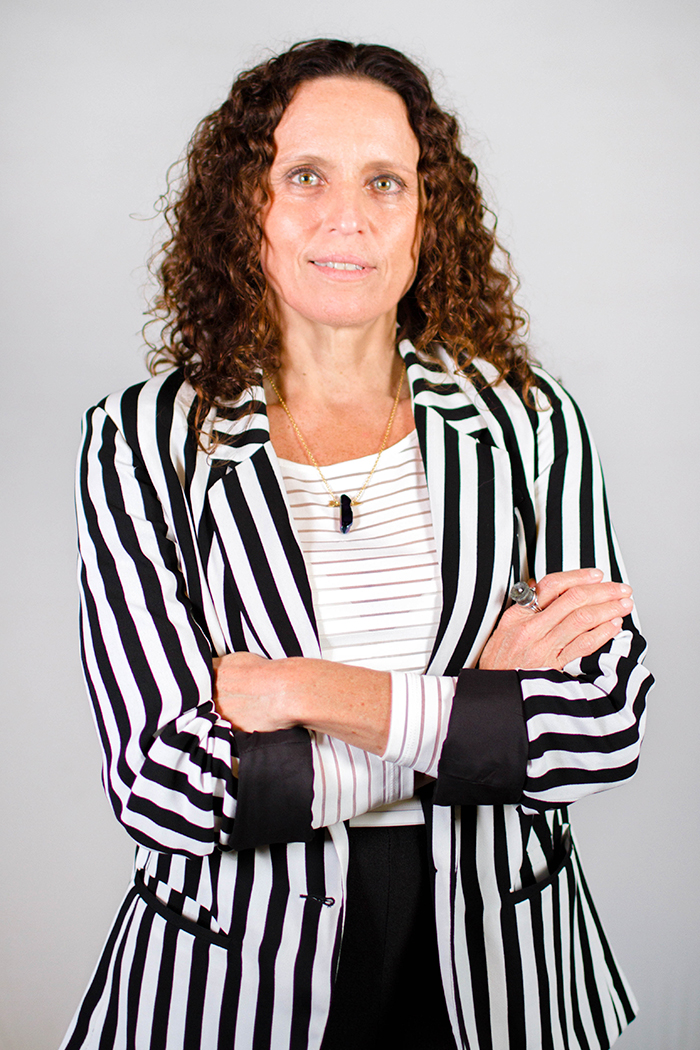
Claudette Maillé

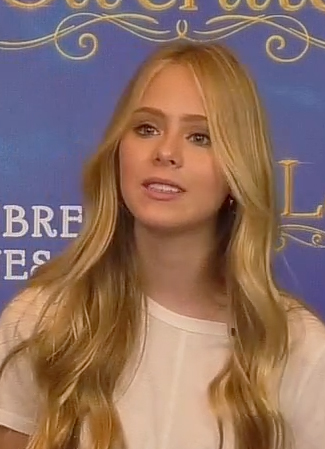
Loreto Peralta

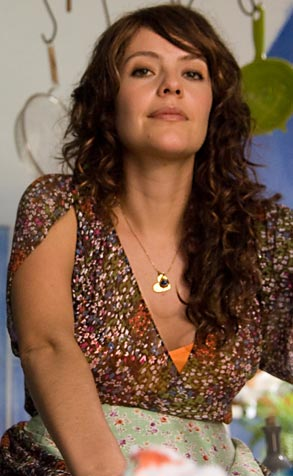
Cristina Umaña

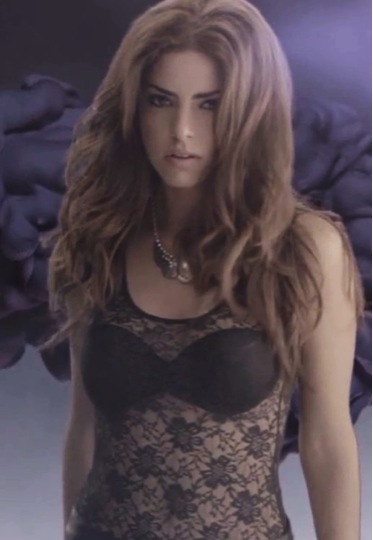
Isabel Burr

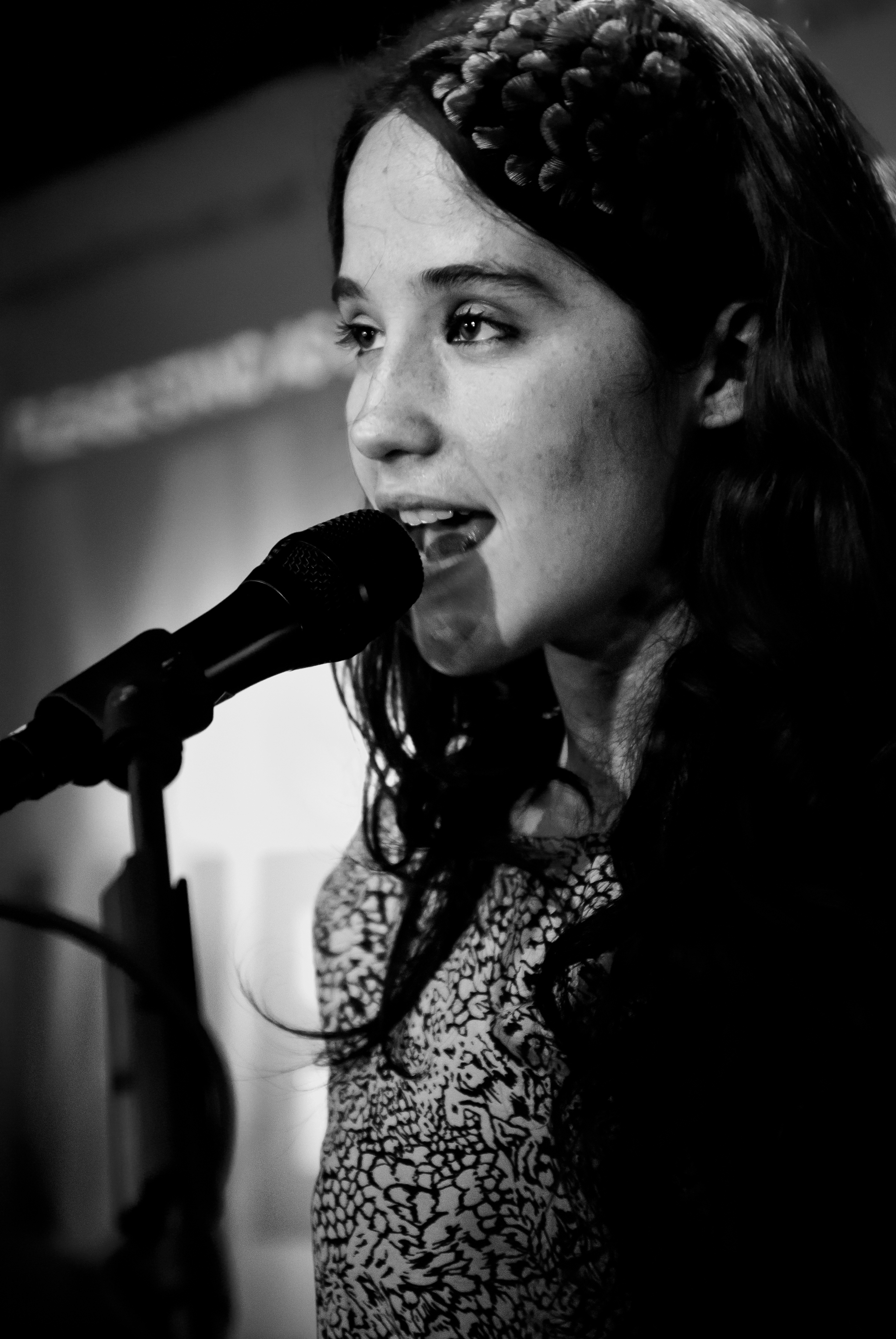
Ximena Sariñana

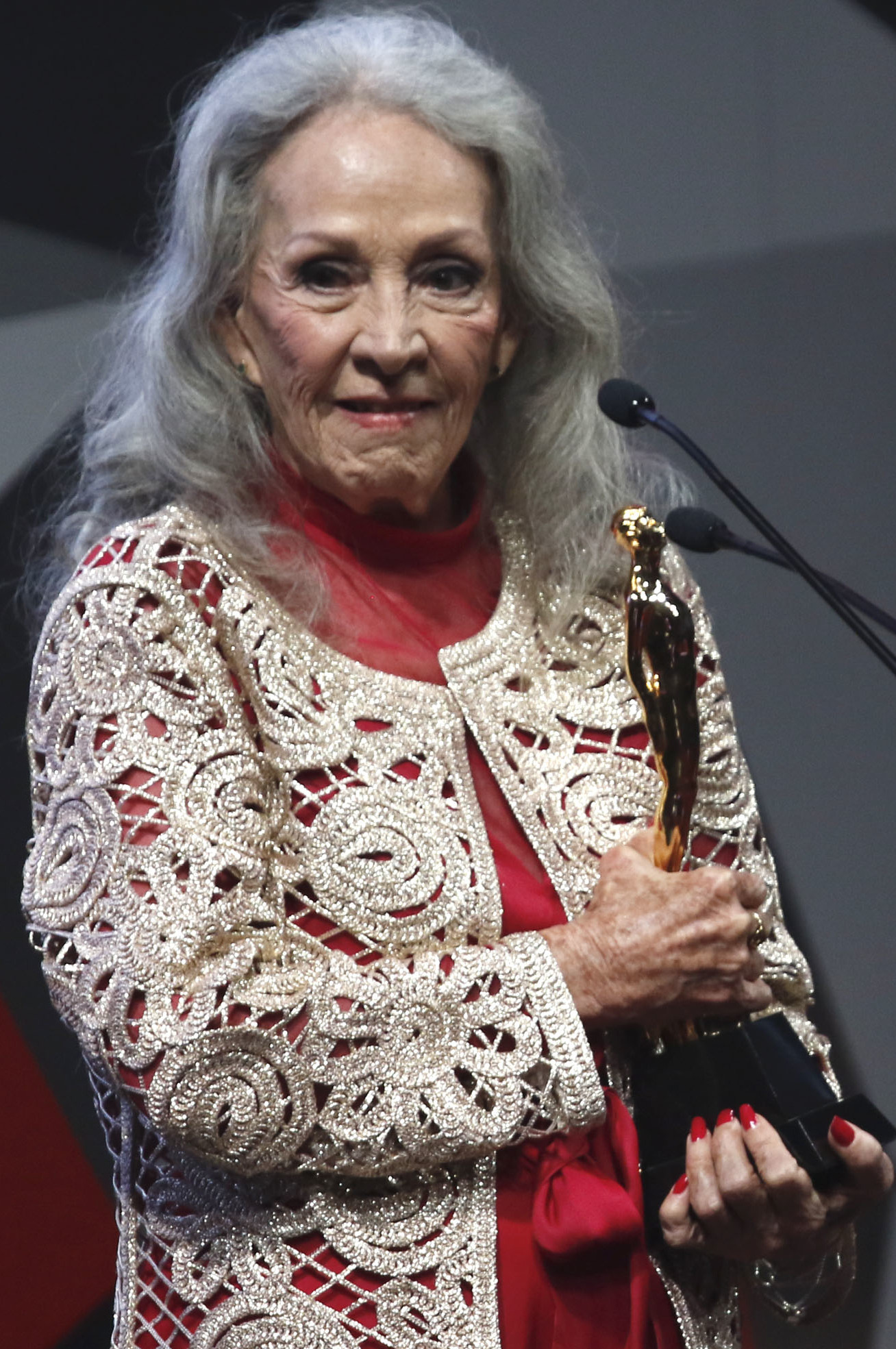
Isela Vega

The House of Flowers is a black comedy drama television series that ran for three seasons, with one short film special, between 2018 and 2020. Predominantly set contemporaneous with its release, it also featured a plot in 1979, telling the story of the de la Mora family and their florists (La Casa de las Flores, The House of Flowers) across several generations.

The first season introduces the family and their associates in 2018; the matriarch Virginia, husband Ernesto, and their three adult children and teenage grandson are developed at the start of the first episode. Various affairs come to light, revealing a larger extended family, throughout the season. The first season largely focuses on Virginia and eldest daughter Paulina leading different fights to free Ernesto from jail.

Chronologically following the first season, but released shortly after the second season, is a special short film showing the funeral of Virginia. There are some guest stars unique to this short film. The second season then follows, focusing on the three children after their mother's death, as well as introducing the villainous characters Jenny Quetzal, Purificación Riquelme, and Victoria Aguirre – a con artist, Paulina's sister-in-law, and the siblings' grandmother, respectively. While the third season continues from the moment the second left off, it also introduces a parallel storyline taking place forty years earlier in 1979, featuring younger versions of several characters, as well as new characters unique to the timeline. The third season follows the de la Mora children, and the young Virginia and friends, as they all mature. A movie released in 2021 follows Paulina.

== Family tree ==
Family tree

Victoria Aguirre	Tatis Corcuera
Chiva	Delia
Patricio Lascuráin	Virginia de la Mora	Ernesto de la Mora	Roberta Navarro	Carmelita Villalobos	Salomón Cohen	Agustín Corcuera Sr.
El Cacas	Celeste	Kim	Dominique Shaw	Simón	Jenny Quetzal	Poncho Cruz
Purificación Riquelme	María José Riquelme	Paulina de la Mora	Alejo Salvat	Pablo Pérez	Elena de la Mora	Diego Olvera	Julián de la Mora	Lucía Dávila	Claudio Navarro	La Chiquis	El Chiquis
Rosita	Bruno Riquelme de la Mora	Patricio de la Mora	"Namibia"	Micaéla Sánchez

Notes: A dotted line indicates a marriage or committed relationship, and a dashed line indicates a more casual romantic or sexual relationship. Solid lines indicate familial relationships. Current and past relationships are included.

== Summary ==
Actor	Character	Appearances			
Actor	Character	Season 1	Season 2	El Funeral	Season 3
Main characters
Verónica Castro	Virginia de la Mora Aguirre	Main	(Note: The likeness of Castro as Virginia appears in the second and third seasons, and El Funeral, though she did not work for the show beyond season 1 and the use of her likeness is uncredited.)		
Isabel Burr	Virginia de la Mora Aguirre		(Note: Burr, Jattin and Correa appear in a photograph in season 2.)		Main (Note: This portrayal is part of the 1979 storyline.)
Cecilia Suárez	Paulina de la Mora	Main	Main	Main	Main
Aislinn Derbez	Elena de la Mora	Main	Main	Main	Main
Darío Yazbek Bernal	Julián de la Mora	Main	Main	Main	Main
Paco León	María José Riquelme Torres (Note: In an episode of season 1, Paco León also portrays the pre-transition José María.)	Main	Main	Main	Main
Juan Pablo Medina	Diego Olvera	Main	Main	Main	Main
Luis de la Rosa	Bruno Riquelme de la Mora	Main	Main	Guest	Main
Arturo Ríos	Ernesto de la Mora	Main	Main	Guest	Main
Tiago Correa	Ernesto de la Mora				Main
Verónica Langer	Carmela "Carmelita" Villalobos	Main	Main	Guest	Main
Ximena Sariñana	Carmela "Carmelita" Villalobos				Main
Lucas Velázquez	Claudio Navarro	Main	Main	Guest	Main
Norma Angélica	Delia	Main	Main	Guest	Main
Maya Mazariegos	Delia				Recurring
David Ostrosky	Dr. Salomón Cohen	Main	Main	Guest	Main
Javier Jattin	Dr. Salomón Cohen				Main
Alexa de Landa	Micaéla Sánchez	Main	Main	Guest	Main
Sheryl Rubio	Lucía Dávila	Main	Main	Guest	
Claudette Maillé	Roberta Navarro	Main	Recurring (Note: Narration only.)	Guest	Recurring (Note: Maillé's narration as Roberta in season 3 is credited as recurring; her physical portrayal in the final episode is credited as a special appearance.)
Sawandi Wilson	Dominique Shaw	Main		Guest	
Natasha Dupeyrón	Ana Paula "La Chiquis" Corcuera	Recurring	Main	Guest	Main
Paco Rueda	Agustín "El Chiquis" Corcuera Jr. (Note: In earlier cast lists, El Chiquis is named 'José Raúl'. In season 3, it is revealed his name is Agustín Junior.)	Recurring	Main	Guest	Main
Eduardo Rosa	Alejo Salvat		Main		Main
Loreto Peralta	Rosita		Main		Main
Mariana Treviño	Jenny Quetzal		Main		Recurring
Flavio Medina	Simón		Main		Guest
Anabel Ferreira	Celeste		Main		
María León	Purificación Riquelme		Recurring		Main
Isela Vega	Victoria Aguirre		Guest		Main
Rebecca Jones	Victoria Aguirre				Main
Christian Chávez	Patricio "Pato" Lascuráin				Main
Cristina Umaña	Kim				Main
Emilio Cuaik	Agustín "Asustin" Corcuera				Main
Recurring characters
Ismael Rodríguez	Jorge "Amanda Miguel"	Recurring	Recurring	Guest	Recurring
Pepe Marquez	Pepe "Paulina Rubio"	Recurring	Recurring	Guest	Recurring
Katia Balmori	Mario "Yuri"	Recurring	Recurring	Guest	Recurring
Mariana Santos	Gloria "Gloria Trevi"	Recurring	Recurring	Guest	Recurring
Irving Peña	Alfonso "Poncho" Cruz	Recurring	Recurring	Guest	Recurring
Michel Frías	Moisés Cohen	Recurring	Recurring	Guest	
Hugo Catalán	Oliver	Recurring	Recurring	Guest	
Ruth Ovseyevitz	Dora Cohen	Recurring	Recurring	Guest	
David Chaviras	El Cacas	Recurring	Recurring		Guest
Alexis Ortega	Dr. Federico "DJ Freddy" Limantour	Recurring		Guest	Recurring
Elizabeth Guindi	Angélica	Recurring		Guest	
Catalina López	Angélica				Recurring
Andrea Sisniega	La Beba	Recurring		Guest	
	La Beba				Recurring
Amanda Farah	Funeral home worker	Recurring			Recurring
Federico Espejo	Willy	Recurring			
Sofía Sisniega	Mara	Recurring			
Roberto Quijano	Luka	Recurring			
Felipe Flores	Lalo	Recurring			
Francisco de la Reguera	Juanpi	Recurring			
Roberto Flores	Pablo Pérez		Recurring		Recurring
Regina Orozco	Rosita's mother		Recurring		Guest
Teresa Ruiz	Marilu		Recurring		
Eugenio Montessoro	Sr. Olvera		Guest		Recurring
Paloma Woolrich	Sra. Olvera		Guest		Recurring
Stephanie Salas	"Tatis" Corcuera				Recurring
Valeria Vera	Sandro				Recurring
Valentina	Herself				Recurring
Luisa Huertas	Silvia "Chiva" López				Recurring
Olivia Lagunas	Silvia "Chiva" López				Recurring
Darío T. Pie	Dr. Meneses				Recurring
Ricardo Polanco	Fercito				Recurring
Mauricio Barrientos	Xavier				Recurring
Guest characters
Manolo Caro	News anchor		Guest		Guest
Eduardo Casanova	Edu		Guest		
Gloria Trevi	Herself		Guest		
Salvador Pineda	Mauricio Pollo		Guest		
Fernando Sarfatti	Carlos			Guest	
Isabel Aerenlund	Naty			Guest	
Sophie Gómez	Daniela			Guest	
Kwang Soo	Junichiro			Guest	
Jorge Zárate	Warden Ortega				Guest
Ramiro Fumazoni	Martín				Guest
Pedro Sola	Henry				Guest
Lucía Uribe	Virginia's school friend				Guest
Pablo Ruiz	Yeko				Guest
Latin Lover	Don Porno				Guest
Paz Vega	Carmelita's mother				Guest (Note: Paz Vega appears in a semi-fantasy sequence, and her character's voice is provided by Karla Delfín.)
Miguel Bosé	Vicar				Guest
Leticia Dolera	Witness (María José's cousin) (Note: The familial relationship is established in the tie-in "La Boda de las Flores".)				Guest
Cast notes

== Introduced in season 1 ==
=== Virginia de la Mora Aguirre ===
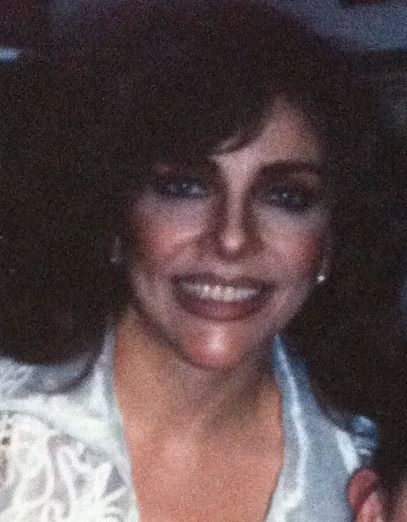
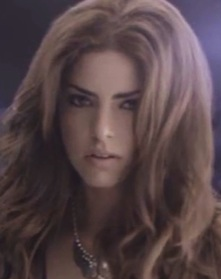
Isabel Burr (right) looks similar to a young Verónica Castro (left); the actresses play Virginia de la Mora at different ages.

Virginia de la Mora Aguirre is the lead in the first season, where she is portrayed by veteran telenovela actress Verónica Castro. As Castro left the show after this season, the character of Virginia was killed off. However, the likeness of Castro would recur throughout the show. The second season introduced a photograph of Isabel Burr as a younger Virginia, with Burr being added to the ensemble cast for the show's final season.

Virginia is seen as a moral person by her acquaintances in Mexico City's upper classes, a status inherited from her own mother. However, she had a liberal youth and supports the LGBT+ community as well as being a habitual pot smoker and sexually liberated. She runs the florists, but starts selling weed on the side to supplement their income when Ernesto is arrested and the family's accounts frozen in season 1; however, she has a vindictive side and left Ernesto in prison even though Roberta left her evidence to help free him. She ultimately sells the florists to pay for his release, before leaving without warning. She travels to the United States for cancer treatment, but dies shortly thereafter, having had an affair with Alejo.

=== Paulina de la Mora ===
Paulina de la Mora (Cecilia Suárez) becomes the lead character from the second season. She is a daddy's girl who works alongside both her parents at their florists and cabaret. A successful businesswoman, she is loyal but also very liberal and accepts everyone no matter their background. This leads to her friendship with drag queens and prisoner El Cacas. In the first season, she begins to fall for her ex-partner María José again, while also discovering that Ernesto is not her real father. She also manages the family affairs and businesses; these three issues dominate Paulina's story throughout the show. Towards the end of the third season, she learns the tragic story of her biological father, marries María José again, and lets go off the florists and cabaret.

Suárez was involved in the project as the long-time muse of creator Manolo Caro. Though neither assumed the character would be popular, her particular way of speaking – as devised by Suárez – became a viral hit. Described as a pop icon, Paulina and Suárez have been given praise, particularly by Vogue España.

=== Elena de la Mora ===
Elena de la Mora (Aislinn Derbez) is another of the ensemble cast. The character is the middle child of the de la Mora family, and the show opens with her return from New York City to attend Ernesto's birthday party. In the first season, Elena explores her fears of settling down and starting a life independent from her family; in the second and third seasons, she unpacks her sex addiction and elitism. She also discovers her own personality, rather than imitating the interests of whichever boyfriend she had at the time. At the end of the show, Elena settles down with boyfriend Pablo, a lower class former colleague, and has a child who she names Patricio. Though he is biologically Diego's child, Elena and Diego choose to raise him together and with their own partners (Pablo and Julián).

Derbez says that when Caro contacted her about being in the show, she accepted both because of Caro's quality track record and because it would be one of the first Mexican Netflix shows. She also noted that sometimes she found the show challenging, as she was working alongside a cast of renowned actors, though she said that they became like a family; she was also pregnant throughout shooting of the first season and found this added some difficulty.

=== Julián de la Mora ===
Julián de la Mora (Darío Yazbek Bernal) is the youngest child of the family. In the first season he contemplates coming out as gay, before coming to terms with his bisexuality and proposing to boyfriend Diego. After they split, Julián reconnects with his ex, Lucía, and apparently fathers a child by her before it is revealed she has told many of her exes the same to scrounge them of money. In the final season, he matures and helps Diego through his own crisis of sexuality, before agreeing to help raise baby Patricio with Elena, Diego, and Pablo.

=== María José Riquelme Torres ===
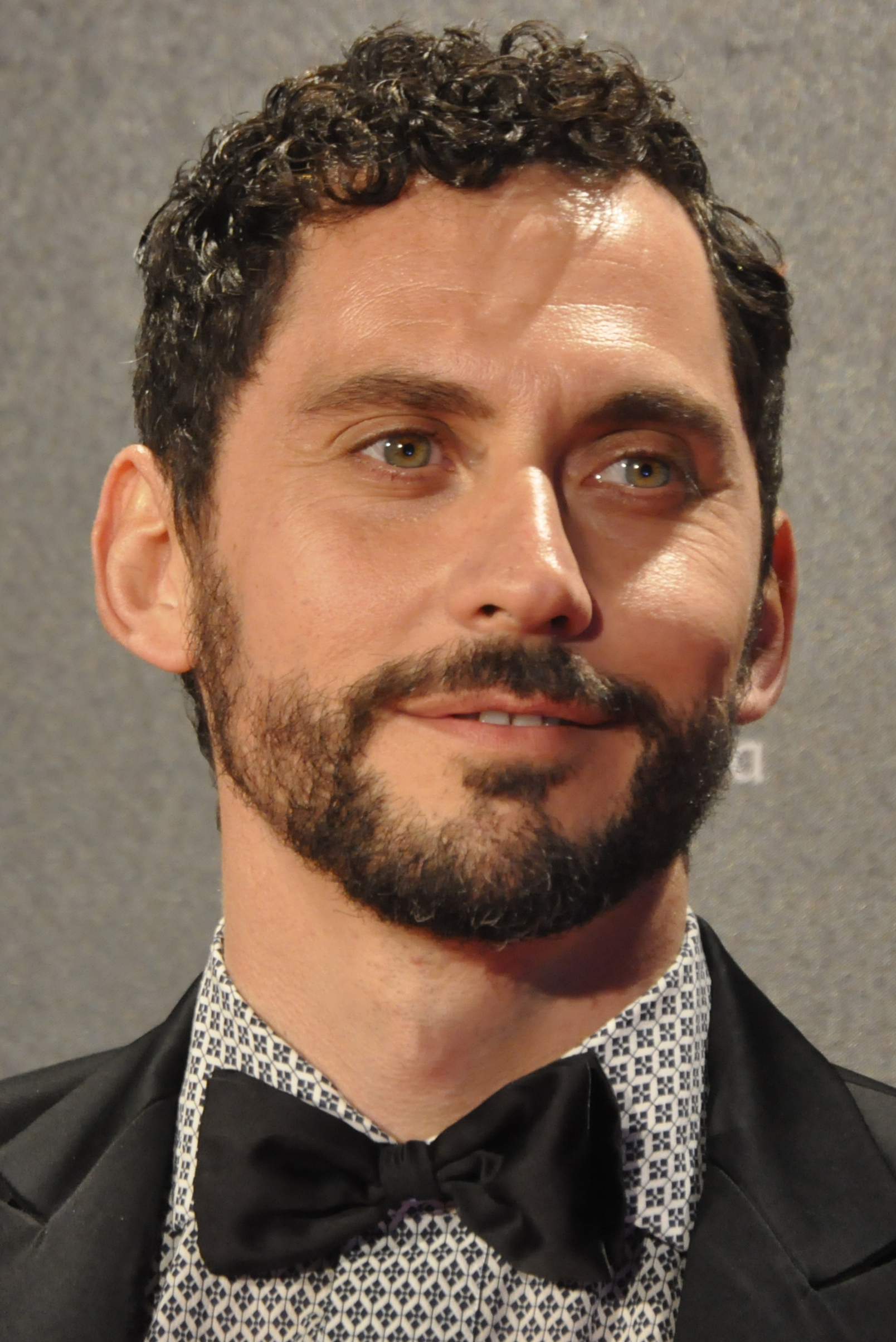
Paco León

María José Riquelme (Paco León) is Paulina's transgender wife. They first dated when María José was José María and attending university in Mexico, before marrying and having their son, Bruno. Five years before the start of the show, María José came out, leaving Mexico and divorcing Paulina. She transitioned in Spain, keeping in touch with Bruno, and returns to Mexico to act as the family lawyer. She and Paulina reconnect, and the family move to Madrid together after Virginia dies. María José also has a mentally ill sister, Purificación, to whom she is devoted. At the end of the series, María José and Paulina remarry.

=== Diego Olvera ===
Diego Olvera (Juan Pablo Medina) was the family's accountant who assisted the dying Virginia; having to keep his role a secret, he came under suspicion of betrayal from Paulina, being held at arms' length until he regains her trust. He was also Julián's on-and-off partner, before they decided to raise a child together. He was raised in a rural part of Mexico and was disowned for being gay; his own family encouraged him to attend conversion therapy when he and Julián were in a rough patch.

=== Bruno Riquelme de la Mora ===
Bruno Riquelme de la Mora (Luis de la Rosa) is the son of Paulina and María José, a teenager who rebels against both of his parents at different times, particularly when they want him to live in Spain. Returning to Mexico, he speaks with an affected Spanish accent and dialect, frustrating María José. Bruno is supportive of Micaéla, his biological aunt despite being younger, accompanying her to a talent show and in trying to become a teen pop idol.

=== Ernesto de la Mora ===
Ernesto de la Mora (Arturo Ríos) is the widower of Virginia, through which he is the father of Paulina, Elena, and Julián, and was the lover of Roberta, though which he is the father of Micaéla. Despite his cheating, he is loyal to all sides of his family. When they were younger, he was a close friend of Virginia and they only married to prevent Virginia from being forced to marry Asustin. Instead, Ernesto was more interested in Carmelita, with whom he reconnects after Virginia's death. Generally uninvolved in the family flower shop, he helped Roberta and Paulina operate a cabaret. He is arrested for fraud he did not commit, with the rest of his family hoping to preserve their reputation by not revealing this, even as the reputation gets tarnished in other ways. He briefly joined a cult that he let take over the family property when trying to find purpose after his life is upended. As a young man, Ernesto is portrayed by Tiago Correa.

=== Carmela "Carmelita" Villalobos ===
Carmelita (Verónica Langer) is a classic nosy neighbor who both attempts to undermine the De la Moras by revealing their transgressions against high society, and constantly seeks the family's approval. She had arrived to the neighborhood as a young woman, and held a flame for Ernesto for many years despite being best friends with his wife. She is generally supportive of the family. For a while she dated Poncho, a stripper from the cabaret who gets injured; Carmelita believes he needs to use a wheelchair and dotes on him, when really he had recovered. She later gets back together with Ernesto. Young Carmelita is portrayed by Ximena Sariñana.

=== Claudio Navarro ===
Claudio (Lucas Velázquez) is the son of Roberta, and Micaéla's half-brother, biologically unrelated to the De la Moras. Based on this, he dates Elena on-and-off, and later La Chiquis. Having some loyalty to his extended family, his priority is his own financial stability and protecting Micaéla.

== Sources ==
- Aguilar, Carlos (January 10, 2019). "Cecilia Suárez & Manolo Caro on their Two Decades of Friendship and Creative Collaboration". Remezcla.
- Alba, María (April 24, 2020). "'La casa de las flores': el culebrón de Netflix se redime en la tercera temporada de los pecados de la segunda" ['La casa de las flores': the Netflix telenovela redeems itself in the third season from the sins of the second]. Espinof (in Spanish). Archived from the original on April 26, 2020.
- Betancourt, Manuel (June 21, 2018b). "If Almodóvar Wrote a Mexican Telenovela, It Would be Netflix's New 'La Casa de las Flores'". Remezcla. Archived from the original on December 14, 2019.
- Betancourt, Manuel (October 18, 2019). "Even Without Veronica Castro, 'La Casa de las Flores' Season 2 Is Still as Dysfunctional & Hilarious as Ever". Remezcla.
- Calderón, Verónica (August 29, 2019). "¡Nueva ma-triar-ca! Regresa 'La casa de las flores' con su segunda temporada" [New mat-riar-chy! 'La casa de las flores' returns with its second season]. Vogue (in Spanish).
- Capelo, María Eugenia (September 18, 2018). "Paulina Challenge, el desafío viral que surgió de un curioso personaje de la serie "La Casa de las Flores"" [Paulina Challenge, the viral challenge that came from a strange character in the show "La Casa de las Flores"]. Infobae (in European Spanish).
- Cobb, Kayla (August 22, 2018). "Netflix's House of Flowers Is the Mexican Desperate Housewives". Decider.
- González, Renata (August 9, 2018a). "Por este motivo Verónica Castro no quiere ser parte de La casa de las flores 2" [This is the reason Verónica Castro doesn't want to be part of La casa de las flores 2]. Quién (in Spanish). Archived from the original on April 23, 2019.
- Mancilla, Alejandro (2018). "Cecilia Suárez's Glory Days". American Way.
- Marie Claire (August 24, 2018). "Paulina de la Mora y su voz, lo mejor de La casa de las flores" [Paulina de la Mora and her voice, the best of La casa de las flores] (in Spanish).
- Marín, Verónica (August 31, 2018a). "'La casa de las flores' o por qué el personaje de Paulina de la Mora es el mejor de 2018" ['La casa de las flores' or why the character of Paulina de la Mora is the best thing in 2018]. Vogue (in Spanish).
- Marín, Verónica (September 11, 2018b). "Los 5 mejores mo-men-tos de Paulina de la Mora en 'La casa de las flores'" [The 5 best Paulina de la Mora moments in 'La casa de las flores']. Vogue (in Spanish).
- Merino, Javier; Huston-Crespo, Marysabel E. (April 23, 2020). "Cómo "La Casa de las Flores" llevó a Paulina de la Mora a ser un ícono pop mexicano" [How "La Casa de las Flores" brought Paulina de la Mora to be a Mexican pop icon]. CNN (in Spanish). Archived from the original on April 23, 2020.
- Netflix Latinoamérica (May 4, 2020). Aislinn Derbez se despide de Elena de la Mora | La Casa de las Flores [Aislinn Derbez says goodbye to Elena de la Mora | La Casa de las Flores] (in Spanish) – via YouTube.
- Pérez Maldonado, Rodrigo (November 5, 2019). "Actor chileno será parte de la 3ª temporada de "La casa de las flores"" [Chilean actor will be part of the 3rd season of "La casa de las flores"]. La Nación (in Spanish). Archived from the original on November 11, 2019.
- Raimondi, Pablo (August 22, 2018). ""La casa de las flores": no es la típica lata mexicana" ["La casa de las flores": not your typical Mexican serving]. Clarín (in Spanish).
- Ramírez, Noelia (August 23, 2018). "Cómo Paulina de la Mora se convirtió en el flechazo televisivo del verano" [How Paulina de la Mora became the television love of the summer]. S Moda EL PAÍS (in Spanish).
- Saim, Amira (March 6, 2020). "La Casa de las Flores tendrá un elenco completamente nuevo en su temporada final y ésta es la razón" [La Casa de las Flores will have a completely new cast for its final season and this is the reason]. Vogue (in Spanish). Archived from the original on April 10, 2020.
- Trome (August 20, 2018). "'La Casa de las Flores': Cecilia Suárez habla sobre el éxito de su personaje 'Paulina de La Mora' en la serie de Netflix" ['La Casa de las Flores': Cecilia Suárez talks about the success of her character 'Paulina de la Mora' in the Netflix series]. Trome (in Spanish).
