= City of God: The Fight Rages On =

- Genre: Crime drama
- Based on: City of God by Paulo Lins
- Written by: Renata Di Carmo; Rodrigo Felha; Sergio Machado; Aly Muritiba; Armando Praça; Estevão Ribeio
- Directed by: Aly Muritiba
- Starring: Alexandre Rodrigues; Thiago Martins; Roberta Rodrigues; Sabrina Rosa; Edson Oliveirra; Wayne LeGette; Marcos Palmeira; Andréia Horta
- Composers: Beto Villares; Érico Theobaldo; Fil Pinheiro
- Country of origin: Brazil
- Original language: Portuguese
- No. of seasons: 2
- No. of episodes: 7

Production
- Executive producers: Mariano Cesar; Monica Albuquerque; Vanessa Miranda; Anouk Aaron; Renata Rezende; Silvia Fu Elias; Marc Helwig
- Producers: Fernando Meirelles; Andrea Barata Ribeiro
- Cinematography: Cristiano Conceiçao; Rodrigo Carvalha
- Editor: Karen Akerman
- Running time: 46–55 minutes
- Production companies: Miramax; O2 Filmes

Original release
- Network: HBO Latino; Max
- Release: August 25, 2024 – present

Related
- City of God

City of God: The Fight Rages On (Portuguese: Cidade de Deus: A Luta Não Para) is a Brazilian crime drama television series that premiered on Max on August 25, 2024. The series serves as a follow-up to the 2002 film City of God, adapted by Bráulio Mantovani from the novel by Paulo Lins and directed by Kátia Lund and Fernando Meirelles. It stars Alexandre Rodrigues, Thiago Martins, Roberta Rodrigues, Sabrina Rosa, Edson Oliveira, Marcos Palmeira, and Andréia Horta.

Produced by Miramax and O2 Filmes, it takes place twenty years after the events of the original film, with Wilson "Rocket" Rodrigues recounting how conflicts between the police, drug dealers and militias affected the community.

The series received generally positive reviews from critics, who praised its faithfulness to the source material, social commentary and cast. HBO renewed the series for a second season.

== Plot summary ==
Set two decades after the events of the film, the series has Wilson "Rocket" Rodrigues achieving his dreams of becoming a photojournalist. He returns to the favela to document the disputes between drug dealers, police, militiamen, and politicians and how the events impact the lives of its residents.

== Cast ==
Translation into English of character's names that were nicknames are between parenthesis when applicable.

=== Main ===
- Alexandre Rodrigues as Wilson Rodrigues / "Buscapé"
- Thiago Martins as Valdemar Cavalcante / "Bradock" / "Lampião" (season 1)
- Roberta Rodrigues as Berenice Aguiar
- Sabrina Rosa as Cinthia Braga
- Edson Oliveira as João Augusto Barbacena / "Barbantinho" (season 1)
- Marcos Palmeira as Genivaldo / "Curió" (season 1)
- Andréia Horta as Jerusa Rocha

=== Recurring ===
- Dhonata Augusto as Delano Braga
- Eli Ferreira as Lígia Rodrigues
- Shirley Cruz as Marta / "Martinha"
- Luellem de Castro as Leka Rodrigues
- Kiko Marques as Reginaldo Cavani / "Cabeção"
- Victor Andrade as Genis / "Geninho"
- Demétrio Nascimento as Cleiton Machado / "PQD"
- André Tristão as "Afrânio" (season 1)
- Felipe Paulino as "Pézinho"
- Otávio Linhares as "Touro" (season 1)
- Matheus Nachtergaele as Sandro / "Cenoura" (season 2)

== Episodes ==
No.	Title	Directed by	Written by	Original release date
1	"Episode 1"	Aly Muritiba	Renata Di Carmo; Rodrigo Felha; Sérgio Machado; Aly Muritiba; Armando Praça; Estevão Ribeiro	August 25, 2024
Wilson returns to the City of God to reconnect with old friends. Bradock's reappearance in the neighborhood sets off a dangerous conflict.
2	"Episode 2"	Aly Muritiba	Renata Di Carmo; Rodrigo Felha; Sérgio Machado; Aly Muritiba; Armando Praça; Estevão Ribeiro	September 1, 2024
Wilson meets a reporter looking to investigate police corruption. Barbantinho attempts to set up a face-to-face between Curió and Bradock.
3	"Episode 3"	Aly Muritiba	Renata Di Carmo; Rodrigo Felha; Sérgio Machado; Aly Muritiba; Armando Praça; Estevão Ribeiro	September 8, 2024
Amid a deadly war for territory, PQD taps into his military background to support Curió, while Jerusa orchestrates an ambush.
4	"Episode 4"	Bruno Costa	Renata Di Carmo; Rodrigo Felha; Sérgio Machado; Aly Muritiba; Armando Praça; Estevão Ribeiro	September 15, 2024
5	"Episode 5"	Aly Muritiba	Renata Di Carmo; Rodrigo Felha; Sérgio Machado; Aly Muritiba; Armando Praça; Estevão Ribeiro	September 22, 2024
6	"Episode 6"	Bruno Costa	Renata Di Carmo; Armando Praça; Sérgio Machado; Rodrigo Felha	September 29, 2024

== Production and release ==
HBO announced in May 2024 that a sequel to the 2002 film City of God would be released as a six-episode series. The series continues to adapt the works of Paulo Lins and follow the photographer Buscapé. Several cast members from the film returned for the series over two decades later.

The series began airing on HBO Latino and streaming on Max on August 25, 2024.

On August 30, 2024, HBO renewed the series for a second season.

== Reception ==
=== Critical response ===
On Rotten Tomatoes, the series has an approval rating of 83% based on reviews from six critics, with an average rating of 5.5/10. On Metacritic, the series holds a score of 53 out of 100 based on four critic reviews, indicating "mixed or average reviews".
