= Vitória Frate =

Brazilian actress

- Born: May 20, 1986 (age 39); Rio de Janeiro, Brazil
- Occupation: actress

Vitória Frate Paranhos (born 20 May 1986) is a Brazilian film, television and theater actress.

She graduated in Performing Arts, in Rio, Vitoria Frate began her acting career in theater in plays such as Nenhuma Palavra, De Para and Um Amor de Circo, among others.

She made her feature film debut in Once Upon a Time in Rio.

She became famous in the rebellious character of Júlia Cadore in the television series India – A Love Story broadcast on Rede Globo channel.

== Awards and nominations ==
- In 2008, she was nominated for "Most Promising Actress" during Prêmio Qualidade awards in Brazil for her role in Once Upon a Time in Rio as Nina.
- In 2009, she was nominated for "Most Promising Actress - Television" during Prêmio Qualidade awards in Brazil.

== Personal life ==
She is the daughter of TV film director Diléa Frate. Her sister Ana Markun is also an actress.

== Filmography ==
- Once Upon a Time in Rio as Nina (2008)
- Léo e Bia as Cachorrinha (2010)

Television

- India – A Love Story as Júlia Cadore (2009)
- Bicicleta e Melancia as Diana (2010)
- Bicicleta e Melancia 2 as Diana (2011)
- Sangue Oculto as young Vanda (2022)

== Theater ==
- Nenhuma Palavra
- De Para
- Um Amor de Circo
- Estragaram todos os meus sonhos, seus cães miseráveis! (2010)
- Alguém acaba de morrer lá fora (2011)
