= Andréia Horta =

Brazilian actress (born 1983)

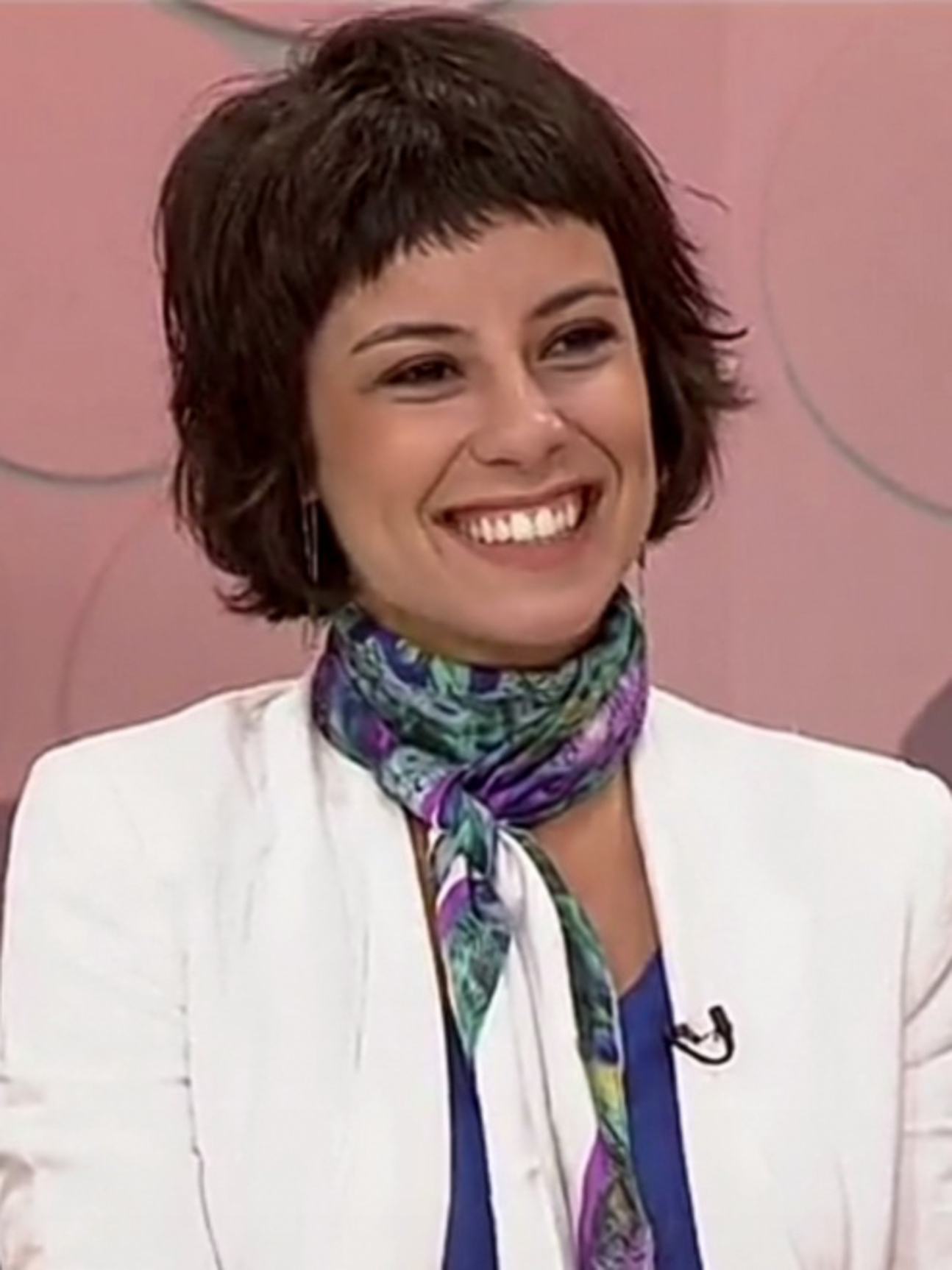
- Horta in 2017
- Born: 27 July 1983 (age 42); Juiz de Fora, Minas Gerais, Brazil
- Occupation: Actress
- Years active: 2004–present
- Spouse: Marco Gonçalves (m. 2019; div. 2021)

Andréia de Assis Horta (Portuguese: [ɐ̃ˈdɾɛjɐ ˈɔʁtɐ]; born 27 July 1983) is a Brazilian actress. Horta was born in Juiz de Fora, Minas Gerais.

== Career ==
Horta played the role of Renata in the Rede Record's telenovela Alta Estação, and played the role of Beatriz in Chamas da Vida, which is another Rede Record telenovela. She has appeared in Globo's series JK, as Márcia Kubitschek, and in 2008, she played the main character in HBO Ole's Alice. She played the lead role in the Rede Globo's TV series A Cura in 2010.

Aside from acting, she is the author of Humana flor, a book of poems, released on October 20, 2008, in São Paulo.

== Filmography ==
Year	Title	Role	Notes
2006	JK	Márcia Kubitschek	Miniseries
2006–2007	Alta Estação	Renata	Telenovela
2008	Alice	Alice	TV series, lead role
2008	Chamas da Vida	Beatriz	Telenovela
2010	A Cura	Rosângela	TV series, lead role
2011	Cordel Encantado	Bartira	Telenovela
2012	Amor Eterno Amor	Valéria	Telenovela
2013	Sangue Bom	Simone	Telenovela
2014	A Teia	Celeste	TV series
2014	Império	Maria Clara Medeiros Mendonça Albuquerque	Telenovela
2016	Liberdade, Liberdade	Joaquina da Silva Xavier / Rosa	Telenovela
2016	Elis	Elis Regina	Film
2017–2018	Tempo de Amar	Lucinda Macedo	Telenovela
2021–2022	Um Lugar ao Sol	Lara	Telenovela
2024	City of God: The Fight Rages On	Jerusa	TV Series
2025	Três Graças	Zenilda Ferette	Telenovela
