= Holy City (disambiguation) =

A holy city is a city of special significance to a religion.

Holy City may also refer to:

- Holy City, California, an unincorporated community and ghost town
- Holy City, Devon, a hamlet in England
- Holy City of the Wichitas, an NRHP-listed site in the Wichita Mountains Wildlife Refuge in Oklahoma
- Holy City Zoo, a former comedy club in San Francisco, California
- "The Holy City" (song), religious Victorian ballad

== See also ==
- Four Holy Cities, the cities of Jerusalem, Hebron, Safed and Tiberias in Jewish tradition
- Holby City, a TV series
