= Lower City =

2005 film directed by Sérgio Machado

- Directed by: Sérgio Machado
- Written by: Sérgio Machado; Karim Aïnouz
- Produced by: Walter Salles; Mauricio Andrade Ramos
- Starring: Lázaro Ramos; Wagner Moura; Alice Braga
- Cinematography: Toca Seabra
- Edited by: Isabela Monteiro de Castro
- Music by: Carlinhos Brown; Beto Villares
- Production company: Videofilmes
- Distributed by: Videofilmes; Lumière Pictures
- Release dates: 16 May 2005 (Cannes); 4 November 2005 (Brazil)
- Running time: 97 minutes
- Country: Brazil
- Language: Portuguese
- Budget: R$3 million
- Box office: R$1,021,626

Lower City (Portuguese: Cidade Baixa) is a 2005 Brazilian drama film directed by Sérgio Machado, who is also one of the script writers. It was released in Brazil and to international film festivals in 2005, including being screened in the Un Certain Regard section at the 2005 Cannes Film Festival. Its general release in the United States was in 2006 in New York.

== Plot ==
Lifelong friends Deco and Naldinho share ownership of an old, rusting boat in Salvador, Brazil. A strong bond exists between the two men, transcending their racial differences. "No woman will come between us," Naldinho tells Deco, and Deco concurs: "All the women in the world couldn't come between us."

That bond is tested after the men meet Karinna, a dancer and prostitute. Karinna needs a ride, and she offers the two men her "services" in exchange for transport on their boat and a little cash.

The emotional entanglements that result from Karinna's "deal" are stronger than the trio expected. Deco and Naldinho develop a desire to possess Karinna. Karinna's desires are more subtle, though it is clear that she feels both a sisterly affection and sexual attraction toward the two men. Karinna gets pregnant and decides to abort as she does not seem to know or care who the father is. She puts the two friends at odds with each other, however they are able to overcome her destructive influence.

== Cast ==
- Lázaro Ramos as Deco
- Wagner Moura as Naldinho
- Alice Braga as Karinna
- Harildo Deda as Careca
- Maria Menezes as Luzinete
- João Miguel as Edvan
- Débora Santiago as Sirlene
- José Dumont as Sergipano

== Notes ==
- Scott, A.O. (2006, June 16). A Love Triangle With Soft Edges. The New York Times, p. B16
