= Sérgio Machado =

Brazilian film director

- Born: 19 September 1968 (age 57); Salvador, Bahia, Brazil
- Occupations: Film director, screenwriter
- Years active: 2001 - present

Sérgio Machado (born 19 September 1968) is a Brazilian film director and screenwriter. His film Cidade Baixa was screened in the Un Certain Regard section at the 2005 Cannes Film Festival.

== Filmography ==
- Onde a Terra Acaba (2001; director; documentary)
- 3 Histórias da Bahia (2001; director)
- Behind the Sun (2001; writer)
- Madame Satã (2002; writer)
- Lower City (2005; director)
- The Two Deaths of Quincas Wateryell (2009; director)
- A Coleção Invisível (2013; writer)
- The Violin Teacher (2015; director)
- Noah's Ark (2024 animated film; director)
