= City of God – 10 Years Later =

2013 film directed by Cavi Borges and Luciano Vidigal

- Directed by: Cavi Borges; Luciano Vidigal
- Written by: Gustavo Melo; Luís Carlos Nascimento; Luciano Vidigal
- Produced by: Carla Osório
- Starring: Alice Braga; Seu Jorge; Leandro Firmino; Douglas Silva; Thiago Martins
- Music by: Gabriel Muzak
- Distributed by: Livres Distribuidora de Audiovisual (Livres Filmes)
- Release date: October 2013 (Festival do Rio)
- Running time: 70 minutes
- Country: Brazil
- Language: Portuguese
- Budget: $90,500

City of God – 10 Years Later (Portuguese: Cidade de Deus: 10 Anos Depois) is a 2013 Brazilian documentary film directed by Cavi Borges and Luciano Vidigal.

The documentary shows what has changed in the lives of the actors from the 2002 Fernando Meirelles film City of God. The actors who portrayed Dadinho/Lil' Zé, Bené/Benny, Angélica, and Mané Galinha/Knockout Ned all participated in the documentary ten years after starring in the earlier film.

== Production ==
Director Cavi Borges contacted Luciano Vidigal and suggested a documentary about City of God. Although they invited Fernando Meirelles to produce the documentary, he declined and said that his involvement could limit their perspective; however, he was an important part of their research. They found 50 people involved in the original film and chose to use 18. The actors were paid $90 for their interviews. In order to raise money, the filmmakers used crowdfunding and threw parties. In the community, news of a retrospective was not universally accepted, as some people disliked the original film for its violence. However, Borges wanted to change international perceptions of the area, which he says City of God colored.

== Release ==
City of God – 10 Years Later premiered at the Festival do Rio in October 2013. Due to unrelated protests, the original showing was canceled, and it was delayed. Its international premiere was at the Miami International Film Festival in March 2014.

== Reception ==
The Miami New Times gave the documentary a mixed review, stating that "Fans of the original film will find plenty to enjoy, but as a standalone documentary about the effect of a hit movie on the poor community that birthed it, it comes up somewhat short."
