= La Academia =

Mexican reality musical talent television series

- Presented by: Alan Tacher; Rafael Araneda; Mónica Garza; Ingrid Coronado; Bibi Gaytán; Fernando Del Solar; Adal Ramones; Cynthia Rodríguez; Yahir; Vanessa Claudio; Jaime Camil
- Country of origin: Mexico
- Original language: Spanish
- No. of seasons: 14

Production
- Executive producers: Giorgio Aresu (2002–2005); Eva Borja (2006–2008); Magda Rodriguez (2009–2011); Juan Navarrete (2011); Roberto Romagnoli (2012–2014); Ángel Aponte (2018–2022)
- Running time: Varies between 2 hours and 3 hours
- Production company: TV Azteca

Original release
- Network: Azteca Uno
- Release: 30 June 2002 – present

La Academia (The Academy) is a Mexican reality musical talent television series shown on TV Azteca, that premiered in June 2002 and is currently in its thirteenth installment. Although the show itself is not affiliated with the Endemol franchise, which includes the "Star Academy" shows, it does share the competition format of many of the variants of the global franchise.

Over the first seasons, the show was a reliable dominator of its time-slot, which was shown by its triumph over Televisa's Operación Triunfo Mexico, in several countries including Chile, Peru and Venezuela. The rival show was only produced for one season, and was in fact the official Endemol entry in Mexico. The last seasons of La Academia had declining ratings, being aired against the Mexican version of The Voice, produced by Televisa, and it eventually ceased production in 2012. However, in 2018, Azteca rebooted the franchise and it aired a new generation of La Academia which received positive reviews from critics and saw an impressive increase in total viewership.

The show has been franchised to other countries: Azerbaijan (Akademiya), Malaysia (Akademi Fantasia), Indonesia (Akademi Fantasi Indosiar), United States (La Academia USA), Paraguay (La Academia Paraguay), Singapore (Sunsilk Academy Fantasia), Thailand (True Academy Fantasia), Central America (La Academia Centroamérica) and Greece (House of Fame).

== Overview ==
=== Format ===
Each year, 14–49 people are selected to live together in a house isolated from the rest of the world, spending their days taking classes in singing, dancing, acting, and related fields, each preparing one or two songs for a 3-hour concert which they give each Sunday evening for TV viewers and a live studio audience. Each week, one of the contestants is eliminated based on the number of votes each one receives, until 4 to 10 students become the finalists and compete for the top prize. Viewers can vote by telephone, text or online. Camino a la Fama aired during weekday afternoons, but it was cancelled after The Ninth Generation. This show taped what the students' lives within the La Academia house. It also demonstrated the singing, dancing, and acting classes.

=== Judges and hosts ===
The longest serving judge has been Arturo López Gavito with ten seasons on the panel, followed by Lolita Cortés five seasons as judge plus two as the academy's director. Óscar Sarquiz, Chacho Gaytán and Horacio Villalobos remain in third place, having been part of the judging panel three seasons each.

Whereas for hosts, Alan Tacher and Rafael Araneda both were part of the show for four seasons each, with Ingrid Coronado hosting three seasons. Judge and host Yahir, and two-time host Cynthia Rodríguez are two of the academy's students who have been part of the panel.

Color key
Judge
Host
Director

Cast Member	Seasons												
Cast Member	1	2	3	4	5	6	7	8	9	10	11	12	13
Herbe Popeyo													
Amparo Rubín													
Pancho Ruiz													
Óscar López													
Alan Tacher													
Juan Carlos Alonso													
Jose Luis Cornejo													
Óscar Sarquiz													
Mónica Garza													
Mimí													
Lolita Cortés													
Arturo López Gavito													
Rafael Araneda													
Enrique Guzmán													
Raúl Quintanilla													
Lisset													
Chacho Gaytán													
Olga Tañón													
Ingrid Coronado													
Bibi Gaytán													
Julio Preciado													
Marta Sánchez													
Cruz Martínez													
Yahir													
Fernando Del Solar													
Horacio Villalobos													
Edith Márquez													
Edwin Luna													
Adal Ramones													
Cynthia Rodríguez													
Danna Paola													
Alexander Acha													
Ana Bárbara													
Vanessa Claudio													

== Series overview ==
No.	Aired	Winner	Runner-up	Third place	Other Finalists	Main Judges				Presenter(s)		Principal
No.	Aired	Winner	Runner-up	Third place	Other Finalists	1	2	3	4	Presenter(s)		Principal
1	30 June 2002	Myriam	Víctor	Miguel; Ángel	Yahir & Nadia	Herbe; Pompeyo	Amparo; Rubín	Pancho; Ruiz	Óscar; López^{1}	Alan; Tacher		Héctor; Martínez
1	1 December 2002	Myriam	Víctor	Miguel; Ángel	Yahir & Nadia	Herbe; Pompeyo	Amparo; Rubín	Pancho; Ruiz	Óscar; López^{1}	Alan; Tacher		Héctor; Martínez
2	8 December 2002	Érika	Marco	Manuel	Freddy & Rosalía	Herbe; Pompeyo	Juan; Carlos; Alonso	Jose; Luis; Cornejo	Óscar; López^{1}	Alan; Tacher		Willy; Gutiérrez
2	30 March 2003	Érika	Marco	Manuel	Freddy & Rosalía	Herbe; Pompeyo	Juan; Carlos; Alonso	Jose; Luis; Cornejo	Óscar; López^{1}	Alan; Tacher		Willy; Gutiérrez
3	14 March 2004	Carlos	Dulce	Melissa	Leticia, Israel & César	Óscar; Sarquiz	Mimí	Lolita; Cortés	Arturo; López; Gavito	Alan; Tacher		Juan; Carlos; Alonso
3	4 July 2004	Carlos	Dulce	Melissa	Leticia, Israel & César	Óscar; Sarquiz	Mimí	Lolita; Cortés	Arturo; López; Gavito	Alan; Tacher		Juan; Carlos; Alonso
4	27 February 2005	Erasmo	Yuridia	Adrián	Cynthia, Edgar & Sylvia	Óscar; Sarquiz	Ilse	Lolita; Cortés	Arturo; López; Gavito	Alan; Tacher		Juan; Carlos; Alonso
4	3 July 2005	Erasmo	Yuridia	Adrián	Cynthia, Edgar & Sylvia	Óscar; Sarquiz	Ilse	Lolita; Cortés	Arturo; López; Gavito	Alan; Tacher		Juan; Carlos; Alonso
5	9 July 2006	Samuel	Colette	Marbella	Renata	Óscar; Sarquiz	Regina; Orozco	Lolita; Cortés	Arturo; López; Gavito	Mónica; Garza		Jesse; Cervantes
5	17 December 2006	Samuel	Colette	Marbella	Renata	Óscar; Sarquiz	Regina; Orozco	Lolita; Cortés	Arturo; López; Gavito	Mónica; Garza		Jesse; Cervantes
6	31 August 2008	María; Fernanda	Fabiola	Luis; Armando	Valeria & Perla	Enrique; Guzmán	Raúl; Quintanilla	Lisset	Arturo; López; Gavito	Rafael; Araneda		Héctor; Martínez
6	14 December 2008	María; Fernanda	Fabiola	Luis; Armando	Valeria & Perla	Enrique; Guzmán	Raúl; Quintanilla	Lisset	Arturo; López; Gavito	Rafael; Araneda		Héctor; Martínez
7	4 October 2009	Giovanna	Napoleon & Sebastián		Agustín, Menny, Oscar & Fabiola	Chacho; Gaytán	Olga; Tañón^{2}		Arturo; López; Gavito	Rafael; Araneda	Ingrid; Coronado	Lolita; Cortés
7	20 December 2009	Giovanna	Napoleon & Sebastián		Agustín, Menny, Oscar & Fabiola	Chacho; Gaytán	Olga; Tañón^{2}		Arturo; López; Gavito	Rafael; Araneda	Ingrid; Coronado	Lolita; Cortés
8	12 September 2010	Esmeralda	Carolina	Edgar	Paolo^{3}, Luis, Edu; Johnny, Daniel; Gerardo & Eri	Chacho; Gaytán	Olga; Tañón^{2}		Arturo; López; Gavito	Rafael; Araneda	Ingrid; Coronado	Lolita; Cortés
8	19 December 2010	Esmeralda	Carolina	Edgar	Paolo^{3}, Luis, Edu; Johnny, Daniel; Gerardo & Eri	Chacho; Gaytán	Olga; Tañón^{2}		Arturo; López; Gavito	Rafael; Araneda	Ingrid; Coronado	Lolita; Cortés
9	21 August 2011	Erick	Pablo	Carmen	Gil, Ronald, Gustavo; Emanuel, Ceci; Yanilen & Hancer	Chacho; Gaytán	Lolita; Cortés		Arturo; López; Gavito	Rafael; Araneda	Bibi; Gaytán	Eduardo; Capetillo
9	18 December 2011	Erick	Pablo	Carmen	Gil, Ronald, Gustavo; Emanuel, Ceci; Yanilen & Hancer	Chacho; Gaytán	Lolita; Cortés		Arturo; López; Gavito	Rafael; Araneda	Bibi; Gaytán	Eduardo; Capetillo
10	26 August 2012	Alexis	Chucho	Selene	Santana, Manuel & Rubi	Julio; Preciado	Marta; Sánchez	Cruz; Martínez	Yahir^{4}	Fernando del Solar	Ingrid; Coronado	Chacho; Gaytán
10	16 December 2012	Alexis	Chucho	Selene	Santana, Manuel & Rubi	Julio; Preciado	Marta; Sánchez	Cruz; Martínez	Yahir^{4}	Fernando del Solar	Ingrid; Coronado	Chacho; Gaytán
11	8 July 2018	Paola	Alexis	Katheryn	Dalia & Silvia	Horacio; Villalobos	Edith; Márquez	Edwin; Luna	Arturo; López; Gavito	Adal; Ramones	Cynthia; Rodríguez	Héctor; Martínez
11	7 October 2018	Paola	Alexis	Katheryn	Dalia & Silvia	Horacio; Villalobos	Edith; Márquez	Edwin; Luna	Arturo; López; Gavito	Adal; Ramones	Cynthia; Rodríguez	Héctor; Martínez
12	10 November 2019	Dalú	Angie	Carlos	Dennis & Charly	Horacio; Villalobos	Danna; Paola	Alexander; Acha	Arturo; López; Gavito	Adal; Ramones	Cynthia; Rodríguez	Héctor; Martínez
12	23 February 2020	Dalú	Angie	Carlos	Dennis & Charly	Horacio; Villalobos	Danna; Paola	Alexander; Acha	Arturo; López; Gavito	Adal; Ramones	Cynthia; Rodríguez	Héctor; Martínez
13	12 June 2022	Cesia	Andrés	Mar	Nelson & Rubí	Horacio; Villalobos	Ana; Bárbara	Lolita; Cortés	Arturo; López; Gavito	Yahir	Vanessa; Claudio	Alexander; Acha
13	14 August 2022	Cesia	Andrés	Mar	Nelson & Rubí	Horacio; Villalobos	Ana; Bárbara	Lolita; Cortés	Arturo; López; Gavito	Yahir	Vanessa; Claudio	Alexander; Acha
14	21 July 2024	Mario	Carolina	Julio	Isaveli, Mar, Brisa & Edith	Espinoza Paz	Chiquis Rivera	Lolita; Cortés	Arturo; López; Gavito	Jaime Camil	Vanessa; Claudio	Héctor Martínez
14	6 October 2022	Mario	Carolina	Julio	Isaveli, Mar, Brisa & Edith	Espinoza Paz	Chiquis Rivera	Lolita; Cortés	Arturo; López; Gavito	Jaime Camil	Vanessa; Claudio	Héctor Martínez

=== Notes ===
1. In the first and second series, the judges' panel rotated between different music experts every week, regular guests are listed.
2. During the eighth series, several guest judges served as temporary replacement for Olga Tañón, such as: Marta Sánchez, Mónica Naranjo, María Conchita Alonso, Elvis Crespo, Tatiana, Dulce, Los Horóscopos de Durango, Gabriela Spanic, Eduardo Capetillo, and Bibi Gaytán
3. Paolo is considered the winner of the Judges' International Prize.
4. Myriam joined the judges' panel on Concert 5.

== Main Generations ==
=== Season 1: The First Generation (2002) ===
La Academia
- Starring: Herbe Pompeyo; Amparo Rubin; Pancho Ruiz; Óscar López
- No. of episodes: 22

Release
- Original network: Azteca 13
- Original release: 30 June – 1 December 2002
- Prizes; 1st: MX$2,500,000; 2nd: MX$1,500,000; 3rd: MX$1,000,000; Guest performers: Irene Cara, Ricardo Montaner, Lorenzo Lamas and Armando Manzanero

La Academia began on 7 July 2002. Fourteen were selected to be part of The First Generation, and Alan Tacher was selected to host. The National Auditorium in Mexico City served as the setting for the final concert, where the winner received a Coca-Cola touring contract, a worldwide trip, a brand new Chevrolet TrailBlazer and the top prize: MX$2.5 million and a recording contract.

Miguel Ángel, Myriam, Nadia, Víctor and Yahir reached the finale held on 1 December 2002. Myriam Montemayor Cruz was declared the winner of La Academia.

Place	Contestants	Age	City
01	Myriam Montemayor Cruz	21	Monterrey, Nuevo León
02	Víctor Garcia Perez	26	Ciudad Madero, Tamaulipas
03	Miguel Ángel Rodriguez Chapital	18	Puebla, Puebla
04	Yahir Othon Parra	23	Hermosillo, Sonora
05	Nadia Lopez Ayuso	19	Oaxaca, Oaxaca
06	Toñita Salazar Zamora	22	Tantoyuca, Veracruz
07	Raul Sandoval	23	Mexicali, Baja California
08	Estrella Veloz Llamas	23	Monterrey, Nuevo León
09	Laura Caro	18	Tijuana, Baja California
10	María Inés Guerra Núñez	19	Guadalajara, Jalisco
11	José Antonio de la O	24	Ciudad Victoria, Tamaulipas
12	Wendolee Ayala	23	Torreón, Coahuila
13	Alejandro Danel	20	Taxco, Guerrero
14	Héctor Zamorano	23	Veracruz, Veracruz

Concerts
Rank	Contestant	07/07/02	07/14/02	07/21/02	07/28/02	08/04/02	08/11/02	08/18/02	08/25/02	09/01/02	09/08/02	09/15/02	09/22/02	09/29/02	10/06/02	10/13/02	10/20/02	10/27/02	11/03/02	11/10/02	11/17/02		11/24/02		12/01/02		12/08/02 Takeover
1	Myriam	Believe with Wendolee	Suavemente with Nadia	¿Quién como tú?	A Dios le pido with Víctor	Como la flor	Mírame	Una noche más	Lluvia		Mudanzas	El último adiós	No me enseñaste	Él me mintió	Suerte		De mí enamórate	Te amaré	¿Como te va mi amor?	La loca	Te quedó grande la yegua	¿Dónde están?	No huyas de mí	Sombras nada más	Como la flor	The rose	Ladronzuelo with Ana Lucia
2	Víctor	A fuego lento with Estrella	Sirena with Miguel Angel	Vuelve	A Dios le pido with Myriam	Dímelo	Nunca voy a olvidarte	Desvelado		A puro dolor	Suave	Usted se me llevó la vida	Procura	Laura no está	Déjenme si estoy llorando		Secreto de amor	Lo dejaría todo	Veneno	Tu cárcel	Palabras tristes	La chica del bikini azul	Es por amor	Como quien pierde una estrella	Desvelado	Unchained melody	Kilómetros with Adrián & Marvin
3	Miguel Ángel	Y tu te vas with Nadia	Sirena with Víctor	Escapar with Raúl & Alejandro	La incondicional	Lloviendo estrellas	Truly, madly, deeply	Cielo	Cosa más bella		Azul	Como te voy a olvidar	Ella	Y nos dieron las diez	Ódiame		Nada personal	Paso la vida pensando	Mis impulsos sobre ti	Tu infame engaño	Por ti volaré, Y llegaste tú	Soledad	No dejes que	Mujeres divinas	Lloviendo estrellas	New York, New York	El duelo with Mauricio
4	Yahir	Amante bandido with Alejandro	Así es la vida with Ma. Ines & Hector	Persiana americana	Es por ti with Nadia	Corazón partío	Princesa tibetana	Let it be	La gloria eres tú		De qué manera te olvido	Experiencia religiosa	El abandonao	Quiero dormir cansado	Fruta fresca		Santa Lucía	El final	Penélope	Para amarnos más	Toda la vida	Despreciado	Entre dos tierras	De un mundo raro	Persiana americana	When a man loves a woman	Hotel California with Manuel
5	Nadia	Y tú te vas with Miguel Angel	Suavemente with Myriam	Killing me softly	Es por ti with Yahir	Cucurrucucú paloma	La gota fría	Costumbres	Entre el mar y una estrella		Te aprovechas	México lindo y querido				Cielo rojo	Te sigo amando	Sola con mi soledad	No me queda más	Llorar	En carne viva	Amor a la mexicana	La diferencia	Bolero falaz	Cucurrucucú paloma	Unbreak my heart	Mío with Elisa
6	Toñita	La vida es un carnaval with Hectir	Si no te hubieras ido with Raúl	Detrás de mi ventana	Mi forma de sentir with Wendolee	Mi tierra	Entra en mi vida	Piensa en mí	Abusadora	Pedro Navaja	La bilirrubina	Cheque en blanco	Una noche de copas	Quítame ese hombre	Amiga mía		Mi error, mi fantasía	Tu voz	¿Qué te pasa?	Amor Prohibido							Ahí te dejo Madrid with Karla & Laura
7	Raúl	Otro día más sin verte with Laura	Si no te hubieras ido with Toñita	Escapar with Miguel Angel & Alejandro	Tristes recuerdos	Jamás	La cima del cielo	Ángel	Que no quede huella		Yo no fui	El ausente	El triste	Necesito una compañera	Señora		Por mujeres como tú	El Amar y querer	Granada								La ley del monte with Víctor Javier
8	Estrella	A fuego lento with Víctor	I will survive with Laura	Te quiero tanto, tanto, tanto with J. Antonio	Alfonsina y el mar	Solo le pido a Dios	Ojalá que llueva café	Como hemos cambiado	Ojalá		Lucha de gigantes	El Breve espacio	De repente	Solo pienso en ti		Sobreviviré	Hoy necesito	Antología									No me importa nada with Erika
9	Laura	Otro día más sin verte with Raúl	I will survive with Estrella	Que bello with Wendolee	El Amor Coloca	Estoy aquí				My heart will go on						Falsas esperanzas	Héroe										Ahí te dejo Madrid with Karla & Toñita
10	María Inés	Me nace del corazón with J. Antonio	Así es la vida with Yahir & Hector	Hijo de la luna	I want it that way with J. Antonio	Soledad	Yo no soy esa mujer			Se fue	Te quiero	Mírame	Ay amor	Rueda mi mente	Cuéntame	No llores por mi Argentina											Mi problema with Azeneth & Gisela
11	José Antonio	Me nace del corazón with Ma. Ines	Rayando el sol	Te quiero tanto, tanto, tanto with Estrella	I want it that way with Ma. Ines	Mi historia entre tus dedos	Te amo	La flaca	María		Primera vez	Perdido en un barco	Mentira			Hoy tengo ganas de tí											Mi bombón with Freddy & Alejandro
12	Wendolee	Believe with Myriam	Eternamente bella	Que bello with Laura	Mi forma de sentir with Toñita					Like a virgin						Hacer el amor con otro											Can't get you out of my head with Rosalía & Alejandra
13	Alejandro	Amante bandido with Yahir	Sabor a mí	Escapar with Raúl & Miguel Angel						Soy un desastre						Sueña											Mi bombón with Freddy & J. Antonio
14	Héctor	La vida es un carnaval	Así es la vida with Ma.Ines & Yahir							Livin' la vida loca						Todo a pulmón											Volverte a ver with Enrique & Marco

=== Season 2: The Second Generation (2002–03) ===
La Academia
- Starring: Herbe Pompeyo; Juan Carlos Alonso; José Luis Cornejo; Óscar López
- No. of episodes: 17

Release
- Original network: Azteca 13; Azteca América (USA)
- Original release: 8 December 2002 – 30 March 2003
- Prizes; 1st: MX$2,500,000; 2nd: MX$1,500,000; 3rd: MX$1,000,000; Guest performers: Alejandro Lerner and Christina Aguilera

The Second Generation was presented at the final concert of The First Generation on 1 December 2002. Once again, the National Auditorium in Mexico City served as the setting for the final concert, where the winner received the top prize of MX$2.5 million, a brand new Chevrolet Cavalier and a recording contract.

Freddi, Manuel, Marco, Rosalía and Érika reached the finale held on 30 March 2003. Érika Alcocer Luna was declared the second winner of La Academia.

Place	Contestants	Age	City
01	Érika Alcocer Luna	28	San Luis Potosí
02	Marco Moré	18	Monterrey, Nuevo León
03	Manuel Mancillas Dena	28	Hermosillo, Sonora
04	Fredy Bautista	19	Tlaxiaco, Oaxaca
05	Rosalía León Oviedo	27	Mexico City
06	Adrián Carvajal	20	Tampico, Tamaulipas
07	Enrique Virrueta Gordillo	21	Tuxtla Gutierrez, Chiapas
08	Azeneth Gonzalez	21	Guadalupe, Nuevo León
09	Andrea Gonzalez Romo	18	Guadalajara, Jalisco
10	Fabricio Martinez	21	Toluca, State of Mexico
11	Ana Lucía Salazar	19	Monterrey, Nuevo León
12	Alejandra Ondarza	23	Mexico City
13	Víctor Javier Ramos	24	Hermosillo, Sonora
14	Mauricio Carrera Carranza	17	Querétaro, Querétaro
15	Marvin Mainte Carpio	22	Tijuana, Baja California
16	Karla Tijerina	19	Ciudad Obregon, Sonora
17	Gisela Lopez	22	San Luis Potosí
18	Elisa Valenzuela Galvan	23	Guadalajara, Jalisco

Concerts
Rank	Contestant	12/08/02 Takeover	12/15/02	12/22/02	12/29/02	01/05/03	01/12/03	01/19/03	01/26/03	02/02/03	02/09/03	02/16/03	02/23/03	03/02/03		03/09/03		03/16/03		03/23/03		03/30/03	
1	Erika	No me importa nada with Estrella	Ave María	Mentiras	Nothing compares to you	Yo pa' ti no estoy	Candela	Rata de dos patas	Te aviso, te anuncio	La puerta de Alcalá	Cosquillas en el pecho	Lo siento mi amor	Ahora que soy libre	Olvídame y pega la vuelta with Manuel	I will always love you	Amanecí entre tus brazos	Si voy a perderte	No debes jugar	Florecita Rockera	Rosas rojas	Mediterráneo	Ahora que soy libre	All by myself
2	Marco	Volverte a ver with Adrián & Hector	Sexo, pudor y lágrimas	Un nuevo amor	Una aventura	Lobo hombre en París	Ángel	Cuando calienta el sol	No puedo estar sin ti	Piénsame solo	Aquí	Me enamoro de ti	Si bastasen un par de canciones	No voy a mover un dedo with Adrián	Todo lo que hago lo hago por ti	La media vuelta	Pisando fuerte	Chulas fronteras	Microbito	Déjame llorar	Con mi sobra en la pared	Si bastase un par de canciones	Every breath you take
3	Manuel	Hotel California with Yahir	Me llamas	Muelle de San Blas	El amor después del amor	La vida loca	Uno	Mamá	Amiga mía	Bella sin alma	Esta noche	Te lo pido por favor	Dueño de nada	Olvídame y pega la vuelta with Erika	Se me olvidó otra vez	Si Dios me quita la vida	No basta	El tucanazo	Viento	Sin ti	La chica de ayer	Amiga mía	My way
4	Freddi	Mi bombón with J. Antonio & Alejandro	Sergio el bailador	No se murió el amor	Torero	Para reconquistarte	Dos amores	Amargo adiós	Lágrimas amargas	Como te extraño	Remolino	Tú me acostumbraste	Me caí de la nube	Quiero abrazarte tanto with Rosalía	Para que no me olvides	Motivos	Preso	El listón de tu pelo	Amnesia	Y ¿Cómo es él?	Lloran las rosas	Amargo adiós	Unforgettable
5	Rosalía	Can't get you out of my head with Alejandra & Wendolee	Coincidir	Genio atrapado	Desesperada	Fina estampa	Entre tu y mil mares	Ardiente tentación	Si quieres verme llorar	Te amo	Tu a mí ya no me interesas	Corazón de melao	El chico del apartamento 512	Quiero abrazarte tanto with Freddi	Lo haré por ti	Fue un placer conocerte	A quien le importa	Será mañana	I love Rock and Roll	Ay amor	Amándote	Si quieres verma llorar	Endless love
6	Adrián	Kilómetros with Marvin & Víctor	Veneno en la piel	Bella	Viviendo de noche	Llueve sobre mojado	All night long	Linda	La puerta del colegio	Quizás	Cuando pase el temblor	Aire	Tiempo de vals	No voy a mover un dedo with Marco	Si tu no vuelves								
7	Enrique	Volverte a ver with Marco & Héctor	Veneno en la piel	Es por ti	Lamento boliviano	Every woman in the world	El besito cachichurris	Esa chica es mía	Te vi venir	Eres mi religión	La Lola	No se tú	Fiesta										
8	Azeneth	Mi problema with Gisela & Ma.Ines	Procuro olvidarte	Acaríciame	Gloria	Amores de barra	Pero me acuerdo de ti	No se como amarlo	Me estoy acostumbrando	Maldita primavera	La gata bajo la lluvia	Baila casanova											
9	Andrea				Si tu te vas	Game of love	A quien	Ay papacito	A donde va nuestro amor	La chica ye ye	El hierberito moderno	expelled 02/12/03											
10	Fabricio							Usted	Gavilán o paloma	El rey	Un hombre respetable												
11	Ana Lucía	Ladronzuelo with Myriam	Coincidir	Turn off the light	Ni tu ni nadie	Serás el aire	Los bomberos	La vida que va	La trampa	Yo no te pido la luna													
12	Alejandra	Can't get you out of my head with Rosalía & Wendolee	Procuro olvidarte	Tómame o déjame	Lobo	Las mil y una noches que pasé	Girls just wanna have fun	Ten cuidado con el corazón	Tu y yo														
13	Víctor Javier	La ley del monte with Raúl	Toco madera	Revolución sin manos	Mentiroso	Vitaminas	Bachata Rosa	La ladrona															
14	Mauricio	El duelo with Miguel Angel	Es tan fácil	Sueños compartidos	Eres mi verdad	Soñador eterno	Mi viejo																
15	Marvin	Kilómetros with Adrian & Víctor	Es tan fácil	Salamandra	Si tu supieras	Tu y yo somos uno mismo																	
16	Karla	Ahí te dejo Madrid with Toñita & Laura	Para no verte más	Murder on the dance floor	La playa																		
17	Gisela	Mi problema with Azeneth & Ma.Ines	No hace falta	Solo se vive una vez																			
18	Elisa	Mío with Nadia	Para no verte más	Quit 12/18/02																			

=== Season 3: The Third Generation (2004) ===
La Academia
- Starring: Arturo López Gavito; Lolita Cortés; Mimí; Óscar Sarquiz
- No. of episodes: 17

Release
- Original network: Azteca 13; Azteca América (USA))
- Original release: 14 March – 4 July 2004
- Prizes; 1st: MX$3,000,000; 2nd: MX$1,500,000; 3rd: MX$500,000; Guest performers: Alex Ubago, Gilberto Santa Rosa and Mariana Ochoa

A year after the end of The Second Generation, The Third Generation, with far more production than before, began on 13 March 2004. The Teotihuacan Hall in Acapulco, Guerrero served as the setting for the final concert, where the winner received a large two story house and a larger top prize of MX$3 million and a recording contract.

This season was the first to have a permanent judging panel.

Dulce, Melissa, César, Lety Lopez, Carlos and Israel reached the finale held on 4 July 2004. Carlos Rivera Guerra was declared the third winner of La Academia.

Place	Contestants	Age	City
01	Carlos Rivera	18	Huamantla, Tlaxcala
02	Dulce Lopez	18	Mexico City
03	Melissa Ibarra	24	Hermosillo, Sonora
04	Lety López	21	Guadalajara, Jalisco
05	Israel Estrada	21	Atizapán, State of Mexico
06	César Robles	20	Acayucan, Veracruz
07	Hiromi Hayakawa	21	Torreón, Coahuila; Fukuoka, Japan
08	Ricardo Hernandez	26	Tijuana, Baja California
09	Suzette Marquez	18	Tucson, Arizona
10	Maricarmen Carrion	18	Puebla, Puebla
11	Martín Vaka	19	Morelia, Michoacán
12	Rodrigo Najera	28	Monterrey, Nuevo León
13	Marcia Peña	23	Querétaro, Querétaro
14	Arturo Quezada	23	Guadalajara, Jalisco
15	Esteban Espinoza	26	Tuxtla Gutierrez, Chiapas
16	Marla Marrun	25	Veracruz, Veracruz
17	Jessica Meza	20	Toluca, State of Mexico
18	Diego Espinoza	22	Mexico City

Concerts
Rank	Contestant	03/14/04	03/21/04	03/28/04	04/04/04	04/11/04	04/18/04	04/25/04	05/02/04	05/09/04	05/16/04	05/23/04		05/30/04		06/06/04		06/13/04		06/20/04		06/27/04		07/04/04	
1	Carlos	Rojo relativo with Diego	No podrás	La distancia	Rosalía with Arturo	Eres	Que nivel de mujer	Burbujas de amor	Vivo por ella	Salomé	Por debajo de la mesa	Sentirme vivo	Baila morena with Cesar	Hombre	Así es la vida with Ricardo	Ingrata	Duende with Hiromi	Usted se me llevó la vida	No me ames with Melissa	El día que me quieras	Beat it	Entrega total	Con tus besos	Esta noche es para amar	Que nivel de mujer
2	Dulce	Estés en donde estés with Maricarmen	Maldita timidez	Sola	Cuando baja la marea with Leticia	Bandido	Si tu eres mi hombre y yo tu mujer	Señor amor	Odio amarte	Mi buen corazón	Ni un roce	Mudanzas	Oye mi canto with Melissa & Suzette	Una pálida sombra	Que bello with Hiromi	Desde el día en que te fuiste	Duele el amor with Israel	Yo te pido amor	Dícelo a mi corazón with Israel			Si tu eres mi hombre y yo tu mujer		Sola otra vez	Mi buen corazón
3	Melissa	Cerca de ti with Marcia	El apagón	LLama por favor	¿Acaso eres tú?	No soy una señora	Ven conmigo	Como tu	Que le den candela	Que vengan los bomberos	Tecno cumbia	O ella o yo	Oye mi canto with Dulce & Suzette	We we	Ahí te dejo Madrid with Leticia	Nunca voy an olvidarte	Azúcar with Leticia & Cesar	Todo, to do, to do	No me ames with Carlos	Bésame mucho	Bad girl	Si nos dejan	Ojos así	Fama	El apagón
4	Leticia	Rosas with Hiromi	Chiquitita	No controles	Cuando baja la marea with Dulce	Corazón gitano	La muerte del palomo	No se si es amor	Veleta	Que ganas de no verte nunca más	El incondicional	Borraré tu nombre	Duele with Israel	Tu hombre, yo niña	Ahí te dejo Madrid with Melissa	Tarde	Azúcar with Melissa & Cesar	Solo hay un ganador	Olvídame y pega la vuelta with Cesar	Amor eterno	Like a virgin	Perdóname	Lo siento	Amanecí entre tus brazos	Chiquitita
5	Israel	Un siglo sin ti with Cesar	Todo bonito	Un buen perdedor	Mi bombón with Esteban	Te soñé	Entra en mi vida	No dejes que...	Tardes negras	Tan enamorados	Y tu te vas	Mi historia entre tus dedos	Duele with Leticia	Si tu no estás	Mi primer millón with Cesar	Desencadena mi corazón	Duele el amor with Dulce	Laura no está	Dícelo a mi corazón with Dulce	Inolvidable	All night long	De que manera te olvido	Corazón partío	A mi manera	Y tu te vas
6	César	Un siglo sin ti with Israel	Sería fácil	Más que tu amigo	Señora, señora	Escapar	Lloraré las penas	Bella	Gavilán o paloma	No hace falta	Candilejas	A puro dolor	Baila morena with Carlos	Caruzo	Mi primer millón with Israel	Sentimientos	Azúcar with Melissa & Leticia	Señora	Olvídame y pega la vuelta with Leticia	Ave María	In The Jungle	Volver, volver	¿Qué será?	Si no te hubieras ido	Por ti volaré
7	Hiromi	Rosas with Leticia	No se como amarlo	Maquillaje	Una lágrima	¿Porqué te vas?	El dolor de tu presencia	Amor de papel	Y volveré	Como duele	No me importa nada	Reflejo	Me enamoro de ti with Ricardo	Gracias	Que bello with Dulce	La playa	Duende with Carlos					No me importa nada			
8	Ricardo	Llueve luz with Martín	Cuando mueres por alguien	El problema	Te necesito	Clavado en un bar	Devuélveme a mi chica	Mentiroso	Mentir	Mi gran noche	Otro ocupa mi lugar	Pólvora mojada	Me enamoro de ti with Hiromi	Muchachita	Así es la vida with Carlos							El problema			
9	Suzette	Se nos rompió el amor with Marla	La isla bonita	Acaríciame	Piel canela	Simplemente amigos	Por cobardía	Al norte del corazón	Me cuesta tanto olvidarte	Como una ola	Piel Morena	No renunciaré	Oye mi canto with Dulce & Melissa												
10	Maricarmen	Estés en donde estés with Dulce	Andar conmigo	Cuando vuelva a tu lado	Solo tú	Pies descalsos	La plaga	Lámpara sin luz	Algo	Amor de mis amores	Cómo quieres que te quiera														
11	Martín	Llueve luz with Ricardo	Desde que llegaste	Bulerías	Si me dejas ahora	Sueños compartidos	Y ¿Cómo es él?	Te lloré un río	Señora	A gritos de esperanza															
12	Rodrigo	Soy un novato with Arturo	Puño de tierra	El poder de tu amor	Carta a Eufemia	La cosecha de mujeres	El amigo que se fue	La culpable	María																
13	Marcia	Cerca de ti with Melissa	Toxic	Recuerdos	Rómpeme, mátame with Marla	Amores extraños	Yo se que volverás	Como olvidar																	
14	Arturo	Soy un novato with Rodrigo	TBC	Amante del amor	Rosalía with Carlos	Bella	Completamente enamorados																		
15	Esteban	Obsesión with Jessica	Mariposa tecnicolor	Bachata rosa	Mi bombón with Israel	Por ti																			
16	Marla	Se nos rompió el amor with Suzette	De mujer a mujer	Amor de tres	Rómpeme, mátame with Marcia																				
17	Jessica	Obsesión with Esteban	La tequilera	Échame a mi la culpa																					
18	Diego	Rojo relativo with Carlos	Jaleo																						

=== Season 4: The Fourth Generation (2005) ===
La Academia
- Starring: Arturo López Gavito; Lolita Cortés; Ilse; Óscar Sarquiz
- No. of episodes: 19

Release
- Original network: Azteca 13; Azteca América (USA)
- Original release: 27 February – 3 July 2005
- Prizes; 1st: MX$3,000,000; 2nd: MX$1,500,000; 3rd: MX$500,000; Guest performers: Tres de Copas, Olga Tañon, The First Generation of La Academia

Almost a year after the start of The Third Generation, The Fourth Generation began on 27 February 2005. The Monterrey Arena in Monterrey, Nuevo León served as the setting for the final concert, where the winner received the newly raised top prize of MX$3.5 million, a brand new Chevrolet Avalanche and a recording contract.

The Fourth Season was highly controversial, with conflicts between contestant Jolette Hernández and members of the judge panel as the main source of controversy. The final results were also controversial, as frontrunner Yuridia placed second at the grand finale.

Yuridia, Adrian, Cynthia, Erasmo, Edgar and Silvia reached the finale held on 3 July 2005. Erasmo Catarino González was declared the fourth winner of La Academia.

Place	Contestants	City
01	Erasmo González	Xalpatlahuac, Guerrero
02	Yuridia Gaxiola Flores	Hermosillo, Sonora
03	Adrian Varela	Culiacán, Sinaloa
04	Cynthia Rodríguez	Monclova, Coahuila
05	Edgar Guerrero	Boise, Idaho
06	Silvia Mendivil	Los Mochis, Sinaloa
07	Jolette Hernandez	Guadalajara, Jalisco
08	José Luis Diaz	Guadalajara, Jalisco
09	Johanna Delgado	Los Angeles, California
10	Marco Silva	Mexico City
11	Paula Gonzalez	Monterrey, Nuevo León
12	Mario Sepulveda	Monterrey, Nuevo León
13	Alan Velazquez	Toluca, State of Mexico
14	Abyadé Rodriguez	Guadalajara, Jalisco
15	Óscar Otuyemi	Pachuca, Hidalgo
16	Karina Cazares	Ciudad Juárez, Chihuahua
17	René Liceaga	Mexicali, Baja California
18	Anahí Garcia	Monterrey, Nuevo León

Concerts
Rank	Contestant	02/27/05	03/06/05	03/13/05	03/20/05	03/27/05	04/03/05	04/10/05	04/17/05	04/24/05	05/01/05	05/08/05	05/15/05	05/22/05	05/29/05	06/05/05	06/12/05		06/19/05		06/26/05		07/03/05	
1	Erasmo	Sabes una cosa with Cynthia	Sueña	Y volveré	La manzanita	Juliantla	Lo pasado, pasado	Triste canción de amor	Hazme olvidarla	Ojalá que te mueras	Que no quede huella	Los hombres no deben llorar		Acá entre nos	Son tus perfúmenes	Debut y despedida	El virus del amor	Maracas with Edgar	Perdóname	La niña fresa	Pero te vas an arrepentir	Por ella with Edgar	Déjenme si estoy llorando	La manzanita
2	Yuridia	Lento with Paula	Antes	Peligro	Tu	Mi forma de sentir	Ámame	Si no te hubieras ido	Daría	Ángel	Lo siento mi amor	Detrás de mi ventana		Como yo te amo	Así fue	A quien	La muerte del palomo	Sin miedo a nada with Adrián	Él me mintió	La maldita primavera	Mentira	Cosas de la vida with Adrián	Déjame volver contigo	Ángel
3	Adrián	¿Ahora quién? with Marco	Me dediqué a perderte	Jamás	Esta ausencia	Aveces fue	¿Cómo?, ¿Cuándo? y ¿Por qué?	Pensar en ti	Aire	Es mejor así			Me va a extrañar	Que lástima	Te extraño, te olvido, te amo	Mi gusto es	Tal como eres	Sin miedo a nada with Yuridia	El triste	Otro día más sin verte	Tú, ¿De qué vas?	Cosas de la vida with Yuridia	Me va a extrañar	Sueña
4	Cynthia	Sabes una cosa with Erasmo	Acción y reacción	Con los años que me quedan	Me equivoqué	Todo mi corazón	En carne viva	Oleada	Mi problema	Tengo to do excepto a ti	Bandido	Amor se paga con amor		Con la misma piedra	Piel morena	A cada paso	Desesperada	Odio amarte with Sylvia	Tu	Quítame ese hombre	Andar conmigo	Cosas del amor with Sylvia	Te amo	Desesperada
5	Edgar	Mentirosa with Alan	Amor del bueno	El autobús	Tu cárcel	La paga	Me llamo Raquel	Nena 99	Las piedras rodantes	La flaca	Sin tu amor	Cuando seas grande		Si yo fuera mujer	La planta	Te lo pido por favor	Camisa negra	Maracas with Erasmo	Santa Lucía	Fuerte no soy	Busca amor	Por ella with Erasmo	No basta	Cuando seas grande
6	Silvia	Loca with Jolette	Ni tu ni nadie	La que baje la guardia	Algo tienes	Amor fascíname	Culpable o innocente	Muriendo lento	Huele a peligro	Mala hierba	La differencia	Cuentas claras		Que me quedes tú	Te pareces tanto a él	Un nuevo amor	Yo no soy virgen	Odio amarte with Cynthia	Esta tarde vi llover	Lo haré por ti	A que no le cuentas	Cosas del amor with Cynthia	Amar y querer	Muriendo lento
7	Jolette	Loca with Sylvia	Loca	Canción del velero	Cielo rojo	Bailando	Soy rebelde	Y yo sigo aquí	Como fue	Quinciañera	Corazón de piedra	Amor a la mexicana		Candela	La gloria eres tú	Ladrónzuelo	Dime	Duele el amor with Jose Luis	Contigo aprendí	¿A quién le importa?				
8	José Luis	Me gusta estar contigo with Anahí	Que de raro tiene	Se murió de amor	Mírate	Te buscaría	Rezo	Dicen por ahí	Serenata huasteca	Contra vientos y mareas	Como quien pierde una estrella	Un nuevo amor		Bailar pegados	La incondicional	Lloraré las penas	Fuego de noche, nieve de día	Duele el amor with Jolette						
9	Johanna	Algo más with Karina	La fuerza del destino	Como me haces falta	Por amor	Costumbres	No me queda más	Si pruebas una vez	Traicionero	Y aquí estoy	Amor prohibido	Eres tú	Sin él	No te olvidaré	De mujer a mujer	Eclipse total del amor								
10	Marco	¿Ahora quién? with Adrián	Volveré	Amor mío	El cielo está perdiendo un ángel	Quieres ser mi amante	Tocando fondo	Volverte a ver	Un montón de estrellas	Yo quiero ser	Somos novios	Voy a llenarte toda		Lluvia	A mi manera									
11	Paula	Lento with Yuridia	Olfato femenino	Ahora que estoy sola	La suegra	Soy lo prohibido	Sin tu amor	Pensando en ti	Innocente pobre amiga				Llorar	¿Quién eres tú?										
12	Mario	Hazme una señal with Abyadé	Mujer fotonovela	Mentirosa	Son de amores	Sueños	Este ritmo se baila así	Hasta los purititos huesos	Que seas feliz	Mi amigo el puma	Martha tiene un marcapasos		¿Qué pides tú?											
13	Alan	Mentirosa with Edgar	Sugar, sugar	No me quiero enamorar	Loco	Quien piensa en ti	Morenita	Shaba dabada					Tu y yo somos uno mismo											
14	Abyadé	Hazme una señal with Mario	Vete por donde llegaste	Algo está cambiando	Vete con ella	Que no me faltes tú	Veinte millas						Falzas esperanzas											
15	Óscar	Paso de gigantes with René	No me lo puedo explicar	Yo quisiera	Tu corazón lo sabe	Baby te quiero a ti							A Dios le pido											
16	Karina	Algo más with Johanna	Dame otro tequila	El sol no regresa	Barco a Venus								¿Quién como tú?											
17	René	Paso de gigantes with Oscar	Nada valgo sin tu amor	Rock de mi pueblo									De pies a cabeza											
18	Anahí	Me gusta estar contigo with José Luis	Ángel										Mentiras											

=== Season 5: The Light Generation (2006) ===
La Academia
- Starring: Arturo López Gavito; Lolita Cortés; Regina Orozco; Óscar Sarquiz
- No. of episodes: 24

Release
- Original release: 9 July – 17 December 2006
- Prizes; 1st: MX$3,000,000; 2nd: MX$1,500,000; 3rd: MX$500,000; Guest performers: Franco de Vita, Filippa Giordano and David Bolzoni

The Light Generation began on 9 July 2006, where the fewest contestants, four, became finalists. The boardwalk of the Port of Veracruz in Veracruz served as the setting for the final, and first open-air, concert, where the winner received the top prize of MX$3 million, a brand new Ford Explorer and a recording contract.

This was the first season hosted by a female with Monica Garza.

Colette, Renata, Samuel and Marbella reached the finale held on 17 December 2006. Samuel Castelli Marini was declared the fifth winner of La Academia.

Place	Contestants	City
01	Samuel Castelli	Zentla, Veracruz
02	Colette Acuña	Ciudad Victoria, Tamaulipas
03	Marbella Corella	Magdalena de Kino, Sonora
04	Renata Rodriguez Barajas	Guadalajara, Jalisco
05	Vince Miranda	Los Angeles, California
06	Julia Hernendez	Paso del Toro, Veracruz
07	Yazmin Valencia	Hermosillo, Sonora
08	Sebastián Garzon	Mexicali, Baja California
09	Julio Elenes	Culiacán, Sinaloa
10	Noé Cantu	Monterrey, Nuevo León
11	Isabel Becerra	Chihuahua, Chihuahua
12	Diego Castro	Monterrey, Nuevo León
13	Carlos Hernendez	Mexico City
14	Iván Rodriguez	Monterrey, Nuevo León
15	Diana Santos	Chihuahua, Chihuahua
16	Citlali Aguilera	Guadalajara, Jalisco
17	César Ceja	Guadalajara, Jalisco
18	Armando Gutierrez	Teopisca, Chiapas
19	Alan Macin	Toluca, State of Mexico
20	Jaqueline Garcia	Oaxaca, Oaxaca
21	Niyet Quiroz	Guadalajara, Jalisco

Concerts
Rank	Contestant	07/09/06	07/16/06	07/23/06	07/30/06	08/06/06	08/13/06	08/20/06	08/27/06	09/03/06	09/10/06	09/17/06	09/24/06	10/01/06	10/08/06	10/15/06		10/22/06		10/29/06		11/05/06		11/12/06			11/19/06		11/26/06		12/03/06		12/10/06		12/17/06		
1	Samuel	Durmiendo con la luna with Julio	Cuando yo quería ser grande	Ojalá que llueva café	Amiga mía	Persiana americana	Color esperanza	Si no te hubieras ido	Mi bombom	Y tú te vas	¿Qué será?	Hasta que te conocí	Un montón de estrellas	Lloran las rosas	La bilirrubina	Los hombres no_deben_llorar	No me ames with Colette	Perdido en un barco	Déjame llorar	Jamás	Escondidos with Renata Cielo rojo with Julia; Sin Miedo a Nada with Marbella	Es mejor así	La Tortura with Yazmín Pasión with Julia; Ven Dímelo with Vince; Duele with Renata; He Venido a Pedirte Perdón with Marbella; Acompáñame with Colette	Al fin me armé de valor	Las_Caderas_No Mienten Sueños with Renata, Colette & Vince	Duele el Amor with Cynthia (4G)	Procura	Fotografía with Renata & Vince	Para amarnos más	Ojalá que llueva café, Color esperanza, ¿Qué será? & Hasta que te conocí	Pedro Navajas	Te sigo amando	Gracias México	En Los Puritos Huesos with Cynthia (4G)	Que será	El ausente	Dígale
2	Colette	Yo lo comprendo with Alan	Señora	Canalla	Cuando baja la marea	El amor coloca	A mi manera	Arrasando	Ahora que soy libre	¿A quién le importa?	Se me olvidó otra vez	Desde la oscuridad	Mudanzas	Ven conmigo	Fue un placer conocerte	Vive	No me ames with Samuel	Como tú	Malo	No llores por mi Argentina	Cucurrucucú paloma with Marbella	Yo no te pido la luna	Acompáñame with Samuel	Oye mi canto	Las Caderas No Mienten Sueños with Renata, Samuel & Vince	La Loca with Myriam (1G)	Vive	Niña with Marbella & Julia Muriendo Lento with Vince, Renata & Marbella	Como una ola	A mi manera, El amor coloca, Vive & Malo	Ya me cansé	La cima del cielo	Hasta que me olvides	Como te va mi amor with Myriam (1G)	Malo	El herradero	Tiempos mejores
3	Marbella	Ay amor with Isabel	De contrabando	Mírame a los ojos	Sin él	De mí enamórate	Que bello	Ojos así	Atrévete	Es demasiado tarde	Déjame volver contigo	Como la flor	Si quieres verme llorar		Mi problema	Innocente pobre amiga	Es por ti with Vince	No me queda más	Culpable o innocente	El dolor de tu precencia	•Cucurrucucú paloma with Colette Barco a Venus with Yazmín; Sin Miedo a Nada with Samuel	El chico del apartamento 512	He Venido a Pedirte Perdón with Samuel	Candela	Las Caderas No Mienten	No Renunciaré with Toñita (1G)	Si te vas	Niña with Julia & Colette Muriendo Lento with Vince, Renata & Colette; El Liston_de_tu Pelo with Vince	Échame a mí la culpa	Sin él, Como la flor, Si quieres verme llorar & El chico del apartamento 512	Sabes a chocolate	Una de dos	Un mundo raro	Te Quedo Grande La Yegua with Toñita (1G)	Si te vas	El sauce y la palma	Lágrimas y lluvia
4	Renata	El sol no regresa with Yazmín	Me pregunto	Mío	Míralo, mírala	Falzas esperanzas	No me enseñaste	Yo no soy esa mujer	Algo más	Todo mi corazón	Espacio sideral	Pero me acuerdo de ti	El último adiós	Volverte an amar	Daría	Rosa pastel	Nunca volvera with Yazmín	No hace falta	Soledad	Ángel	Escondidos with Samuel	Te aviso, te anuncio	Duele with Samuel	¿Dónde están?	Las Caderas No Mienten Sueños with Samuel, Colette & Vince; Amiga with Vince	Reloj Cucú with Estrella (1G)	Diablo	Fotografía with Samuel & Vince Muriendo Lento with Colette, Marbella & Vince	Te quise tanto	Falsas esperanzas, Algo más, Espacio sideral & Daría	Pop	Estés en donde estés	Ni una sola palabra	Derroche with Estrella (1G)	Espacio sideral	Serenata huasteca	Eclipse total del amor
5	Vince	Responde with Diego	Niña	Uno	Será que no me amas	Todo a pulmón	Rayando el sol	Santa Lucía	TBC	Me dediqué a perderte	Corazón partío vs. Sebastián	Sexo, pudor y lágrimas	Te amo	Baila morena	Bulería	New York	Es por ti with Marbella	Princesa tibetana	Hoy tengo ganas de ti	Bienvenidos	Amanecí entre tus brazos with Julia	Livin' la vida loca	Ven dimelo with Samuel	Corazón espinado	Las Caderas No Mienten Sueños with Renata, Colette & Samuel; Amiga with Renata	No Soy El Aire with Carlos (3G)	Obsesión	Fotografía with Renata & Samuel Muriendo Lento with Marbella, Renata, Colette; El Liston de tu Pelo with Marbella	Lo dejaría todo	Todo a pulmón, Te Amo, Baila morena & Bulería	Mackie el navaja	Antes	Si tú no vuelves with Citlali		Desencadena mi corazon		
6	Julia	No tengo dinero with Carlos A.	Y te aprovechas	Los caminos de la vida	Tristes recuerdos	Si nos dejan	Ladronzuelo	Piensa en mí	Mi gusto es	Rata de dos patas vs. Niyet	Lo pasado, pasado	Que nadie sepa mi sufrir	Yo no nací para amar	Tú a mí ya no me interesas	Loca	Nube gris	El sirenito with Julio	Antes muerta que sencilla	Ya no te vayas	Baila esta cumbia	Amanecí entre tus brazos with Vince Cielo Rojo with Samuel	La vida es un carnaval	Pasión with Samuel	Que vengan los bomberos	Las Caderas No Mienten	Pero Te Vas A Arrepentir with Erasmo (4G)	El golpe traidor	Niña with Marbella & Colette					Traicionero with Isabel				
7	Yazmín	El sol no regresa with Renata	¿Qué hago yo?	Como han pasado los años	La chica ye-ye	Te quedó grande la yegua	Ay amor	Besos de ceniza	Hacer el amor con otro	Por ti	Nada	Tu peor error	Mi error, mi fantasía	Simplemente amigos	Muévelo	No debes jugar	Nunca volvera with Renata	Odio amarte	La differencia	Quiero estar contigo	Si no es ahora with Sebastián Barco a Venus with Marbella	Cuéntame	La Tortura with Samuel	Amar sin ser amada	Las Caderas No Mienten	La Ciudad with Jose Luis (4G)							Por besarte with Noé				
8	Sebastián	Eres divina with Cesar	Mi sombra en la pared	No	Ódiame						Corazón partío vs. Vince	Ella	Abrázame vs. Julio	Perdón ¿Porqué?	Mi viejo	La zopilota	Ojala que te mueras with Noé	Te solté la rienda	El aventurero	Amargo adiós	Si no es ahora with Yazmín												No with Carlos A.				
9	Julio	Durmiendo con la luna with Samuel	Mentira	Vamos pa' la conga	Payasito								Abrázame vs. Sebastián	Señora	Viviendo_de_ prisa	El problema	El Sirenito with Julia	Lloviendo estrellas	Si tú supieras																		
10	Noé	Rumores with Jacqueline	Esa pared	Eres	María	Soy un truhán, soy un señor	Secreto de amor	Por amarte así vs.Iván	El abandonado	Y to do ¿Para qué?	Torero	Mi gran noche	Pachuco	Te lo pido por favor	El amigo que se fue	La camisa negra	Ojala que te mueras with Sebastián																Por besarte with Yazmín				
11	Isabel	Ay amor with Marbella	El hombre que yo amo	Amor prohibido	Lo siento mi amor	Amiga mía	Mi tierra	Dime	¿Sabes una cosa?	La gata bajo la lluvia	A fuego lento	Tú	Me gustas mucho tú	Mujer Latina	Sola																		Traicionero with Julia				
12	Diego	Responde with Vince	Completamente	El gato en la oscuridad	Sirena	A Dios le pido	Márchate ya	A puro dolor	Ámame hasta con los dientes	Dime ven	Azul	Suave	Al final	Sentimental vs. Diana																			Quemándome de amor with Diana				
13	Carlos	No tengo dinero with Julia	Hasta que vuelvas	Ahora que no estás	Como quien pierde una estrella	Desvelado	No me sé rajar	Salomé	¿Ahora quién?	Y llegaste tú	Las curvas de esa chica	La Chona																					No with Sebastián				
14	Iván							Por amarte así vs.Noé	No podrás	Ave María	Tan enamorado																										
15	Diana	Mírame with Niyet	Seducción	Al pasar	Mírame	Andar conmigo	Te dejo madrid	La playa	Rueda mi mente	Llama por favor				Sentimental vs. Diego																			Quemándome de amor with Diego				
16	Citlali	Me nace del corazón with Armando	Hombres al borde de un ataque de celos	Heridas	Amor eterno	La trampa	Él me mintió	Si una vez	¿Quién eres tú?																								Si tú no vuelves with Vince				
17	César	Eres divina with Sebastián	La bomba	Frágil	Mujeres	El pecador	Bella	Tantita pena																									Cómo, cuándo, por qué with Alan				
18	Armando	Me nace del corazón with Citlali	Con mucho corazón	En mis sueños	De pies a cabeza	La culpable	Mi forma de sentir																														
19	Alan	Yo lo comprendo with Colette	Nada fue un error	Tocando fondo	Caraluna	ADO																											Cómo, cuándo, por qué with Cesar				
20	Jaqueline	Rumores with Noé	La carcacha	¿Dónde irán?																																	
21	Niyet	Mírame with Diana	No controles							Rata de dos patas vs. Julia																											

=== Season 6: The Last Generation (2008) ===
La Academia
- Starring: Arturo López Gavito; Raúl Quintanilla; Lisset; Enrique Guzmán
- No. of episodes: 16

Release
- Original network: Azteca 13; Azteca America (USA)
- Original release: 31 August – 14 December 2008
- Prizes; 1st: MX$3,000,000; 2nd: Recording Contract; 3rd: Recording Contract; Guest performers: Ana Gabriel, Enrique Guzmán, The First Generation of La Academia

The Last Generation began on 31 August 2008. The Víctor Manuel Reyna Stadium in Tuxtla Gutiérrez, Chiapas served as the setting for the final concert, where the winner received the top prize of MX$3 million, a brand new Ford Expedition, a recording contract and the new La Academia Trophy.

Perla, María Fernada, Fabiola, Luis Armando and Valeria reached the finale held on 12 December 2008. María Fernanda Alvo Díaz was declared the sixth winner of La Academia.

Later María Fernanda, Valeria, Perla, Jackie, Fatima and Alex formed a girl group called G6; Fabiola Rodas won the third season of Desafío de Estrellas a year later.

Place	Contestants	Age	City
01	María Fernanda Alvo	21	Guadalajara, Jalisco
02	Fabiola Rodas	16	Guatemala
03	Luis Armando	24	Cerro Azul, Veracruz
04	Valeria Dessens	16	Hermosillo, Sonora
05	Perla Estrada	17	Caborca, Sonora
06	Alex Garza	21	Monterrey, Nuevo León
07	Jackie Gonzalez	22	Perris, California
08	Matías Aranda	23	Córdoba, Argentina
09	Wilfredo Pineda	16	Culiacán, Sinaloa
10	Esteban Vazquez	18	Odessa, Texas
11	Cintia Urtiaga	17	Guadalajara, Jalisco
12	Iván Estrada	18	Mexico City
13	Fátima Molina	22	Guadalajara, Jalisco
14	Héctor Silva	25	Monterrey, Nuevo León
15	Alba Alcudia	15	Nacajuca, Tabasco
16	Gerardo Castillo	22	Guatemala City, Guatemala
17	Monserrat Monroy	18	Alvarado, Veracruz
18	Dasahev Saavedra	19	Hermosillo, Sonora
19	Alejandra Sandoval	15	Guadalajara, Jalisco
20	José Roberto Carrillo	24	Tecate, Baja California

Concerts
Rank	Contestant	08/31/08	09/07/08	09/14/08	09/21/08	09/28/08	10/05/08	10/12/08	10/19/08	10/26/08	11/02/08	11/09/08	11/16/08	11/23/08	11/30/08	12/07/08		12/14/08	
1	Ma. Fernanda	El tiempo de ti with Valeria & Alex	Soy sólo un secreto with Gerardo	Cinco minutos with Jackie	¿Es ella más que yo? with Alex	Yo por él	El me mintió	Mala hierba	Tú	Lo siento with Fabiola	El incondicional with Valeria	La voz de la experiencia	El hombre que yo amo	Ángel	Ángel	Eclipse total del amor	La Tortura with Luis Armando	Él me mintió	Sobreviviré
2	Fabiola	Las de la intuición with Cintia & Fátima	Volveré with Cintia	Luz sin gravedad with Valeria	Víveme	Daría with Gerardo	El amor coloca	¿Quién eres tú?	Sé como duele	Lo siento with Ma.Fernanda	Tocando fondo with Alex	Como olvidar	Tristes recuerdos	Cuando baja la marea	Yo´pa ti no estoy	Por cobardía	Ven conmigo with Valeria	Como olvidar	Regresa a mi
3	Luis Armando	Mi credo with Dazahev & Sergio	Todo cambio with Alba	Por ella	Fuerte no soy	No soy el aire	Los hombres no deben llorar	Hazme olvidarla	Gavilán o paloma	La cosa más bella	Mis ojos lloran por ti with Jackie	La planta	En mi viejo San Juan	Me enamoro de ti	Mi amigo el tordillo	Caminos de Michoacán	La tortura with Ma.Fernanda	Mis ojos lloran por ti	Al final
4	Valeria	El tiempo de ti with Ma.Fernanda & Alex	Hoy ya me voy with Iván	Luz sin gravedad with Fabiola	¿Qué hago yo?	Falsas esperanzas	Ese hombre with Alex	Sueños rotos	Si una vez	Pienso en ti with Alex	El incondicional with Ma.Fernanda	Detrás de mi ventana	Si quieres verme llorar	De mí enamórate	Aún sin ti	Mentira	Ven conmigo with Fabiola	Ese hombre	Volverte an amar
5	Perla	Estos celos with Esteban & J.Roberto	El sol no regresa with Wilfredo	Duele el amor with Wilfredo	Vete por donde llegaste	Sin él	Innocente pobre amiga	Estés en donde estés with Alba	Tu de que vas	La plaga	Lo haré por ti with Cintia	La papa sin catsup	Carcacha	Cielo rojo	Como tu mujer	Hey Güera	Me nace del corazón with Alex	La papa sin catsup	Lo siento mi amor
6	Alex	El tiempo de ti with Ma.Fernanda & Valeria	A labio dulce with Hector	Me va a extrañar with Gerardo	¿Es ella más que yo? with Ma.Fernanda	Me equivoqué	Ese hombre with Valeria	Ya no quiero	Quítame a ese hombre	Pienso en ti with Valeria	Tocando fondo with Fabiola	Algo más	Desesperada	Así fue	Huele a peligro	Tarde	Me nace del corazón with Perla	Así fue	
7	Jackie	Vuelvo a comenzar with Gerardo & Wilfredo	De rodillas with Esteban	Cinco minutos with Ma.Fernanda	Muriendo lento with Fatima	Labios compartidos with Matías	Si no te hubieras ido	Que ganas de no verte nunca más	A que no le cuentas	Me dediqué a perderte with Esteban	Mis ojos lloran por ti with Luis Armando	Malo	Secreto de amor	Otro día más sin verte	Lloran las rosas				
8	Matías	Como un lobo with Alejandra, Flor & Erick	Dímelo with Fatima	Buenos días señor sol with Alejandra & Dazahev	Y te vas with Hector	Labios compartidos with Jackie	De música ligera	Lloraré las penas with Hector	Mujeres	Vuelve	Dime ven with Iván	Mientes tan bien	La muralla	Lamento boliviano					
9	Wilfredo	Vuelvo a comenzar with Jackie & Gerardo	El sol no regresa with Perla	Duele el amor with Perla	Amiga por favor with Iván	Amargo adiós	Y llegaste tú with Cintia	Por mujeres como tú	Bella	Por ti volaré	Mujeres divinas with Esteban	Ahora te puedes marchar	Sueños	Otra vez					
10	Esteban	Estos celos with Perla & J.Roberto	De rodillas with Jackie	No te pido flores with Monserrat	El tamarindo with Dazahev	Por tu amor with Alba	Y te aprovechas with Alba	Como quien pierde una estrella	Entra en mí vida	Me dediqué a perderte with Jackie	Mujeres divinas with Wilfredo	Sabes a chocolate	El aventurero						
11	Cintia	Las de la intuición with Fabiola & Fatima	Volveré with Fabiola	Te voy a perder with Iván	Ni una sola palabra	Devórame otra vez with Monserrat	Y llegaste tú with Wilfredo	Besos de ceniza with Fátima	Me equivoqué	Lluvia	Lo haré por ti with Perla	Como me haces falta							
12	Iván	Un montón de estrellas with Alba & Monserrat	Hoy ya me voy with Valeria	Te voy a perder with Cintia	Amiga por favor with Wilfredo	Si tu te atreves	Niña with Gerardo	La bomba	No me doy por vencido	Princesa tibetana	Dime ven with Matías								
13	Fátima	Las de la intuición with Cintia & Fabiola	Dímelo with Matías	Cada que with Hector	Muriendo lento with Jackie	Tatuajes with Hector	No me enseñaste	Besos de ceniza with Cintia	Una noche de copas	Antología									
14	Héctor	Me enamora with Manuel	A labio dulce with Jackie	Cada que with Fatima	Y te vas with Matías	Tatuajes with Fatima	Bruja hada	Lloraré las penas with Matías	Chica de Humo										
15	Alba	Un montón de estrellas with Iván & Monserrat	Todo cambio with Luis Armando	Mi error, mi fantasía	Amor de mis amores	Por tu amor with Esteban	Y te aprovechas with Esteban	Estés en donde estés with Perla											
16	Gerardo	Vuelvo a comenzar with Jackie & Wilfredo	Soy solo un secreto with Ma.Fernanda	Me va a extrañar with Alex	Te Amo	Daría with Fabiola	Niña with Iván												
17	Monserrat	Un montón de estrellas with Ivan & Alba	El presente with Alejandra	No te pido flores with Esteban	Yo no te pido la Luna	Devórame otra vez with Cintia													
18	Dazahev	Mi credo with Luis Armando & Sergio	No podrás with J. Roberto	Buenos días señor sol with Aejandra & Matías	El tamarindo with Esteban														
19	Alejandra	Como un lobo with Matías, Flor & Erick	El presente with Monserrat	Buenos días señor sol with Matías & Dazahev															
20	José Roberto	Estos celos with Perla & Esteban	No podrás with Dazahev																
21-25	Sergio	Mi Credo with Luis Armando & Dazahev																	
21-25	Manuel	Me Enamora with Hector																	
21-25	Flor	Como un lobo with Matías, Alejandra & Erick																	
21-25	Erick	Como un lobo with Matías, Alejandra & Flor																	
21-25	Lyanne	Opening theme (was disqualified before she could sing)																	

=== Season 7: The New Generation (2009) ===
La Academia
- Starring: Arturo López Gavito; Olga Tañón; Chacho Gaytán
- No. of episodes: 12

Release
- Original network: Azteca 13
- Original release: 4 October – 14 December 2009
- Prizes; 1st: MX$1,000,000; 2nd: Recording Contract; 3rd: Recording Contract; Guest performers: Daddy Yankee, Angel & Kriz, El Tri, Yuridia

The New Generation was renewed due to the popular demand and led by the most outspoken critic, Lolita Cortés, beginning on 4 October 2009. This season featured 36 contestants, and seven, became finalists. The Víctor Manuel Reyna Stadium in Tuxtla Gutiérrez, Chiapas once again served as the setting for the final concert, where the winner received the lowest top prize of MX$1 million and a recording contract.

Agustín, Oscar, Fabiola, Sebastián, Menny, Giovanna and Napoleón reached the finale held on 20 December 2009. Giovanna Nicole Paz was declared the seventh winner of La Academia.

Place	Contestants	Age	City
01	Giovanna Paz	16	Manzanillo, Colima
02	Sebastián Martingaste	25	Buenos Aires, Argentina
02	Napoleón Robleto	23	Cobán, Guatemala
04	Agustín Argüello	19	Córdoba, Argentina
05	Menny Carrasco	26	Chihuahua, Chihuahua
06	Oscar Jiménez	22	Guadalajara, Jalisco
07	Fabiola Jaramillo	30	Orizaba, Veracruz
08	Jaccyve Álvarez	23	Coatzacoalcos, Veracruz
09	Mike Bobadilla	28	Culiacán, Sinaloa
10	Luz Leguizama	24	Oakland, California
11	Rod Pérez	17	Mérida, Yucatán
12	Patricia Ahjtung	15	Catemaco, Veracruz
13	Alejandra Capelini	22	Xalapa, Veracruz
14	María Reynoso	18	Guadalajara, Jalisco
15	Daniel Solís*	41*	Tijuana, Baja California
16	Adriana Sánchez	29	Guadalajara, Jalisco
17-19	Mayrenne Carvajal	40	Veracruz, Veracruz
17-19	Roy Rosas	32	Nogales, Sonora
17-19	Yadhira Mendez	21	Aguascalientes, Aguascalientes
20-23	Brian Vega	21	Monterrey, Nuevo León
20-23	Carlos Pleasant	28	Aguascalientes, Aguascalientes
20-23	Luis Guillen	38	Los Angeles, California
20-23	Roberto Vázquez	29	León, Guanajuato
24-28	Alex García	15	Monclova, Coahuila
24-28	Dafne Olivera	40	Mexico City
24-28	Ingrid Álvarez	15	Tuxtla Gutiérrez, Chiapas
24-28	Mell Rivera	21	Los Angeles, California
24-28	Nicole Vargas	17	Guadalajara, Jalisco
29-35	Alberto Campos	24	Mexico City
29-35	Daniela Rodríguez	23	Mexico City
29-35	Denisse Marion Vega	22	Mexico City
29-35	Kurt Arredondo	27	Irapuato, Guanajuato
29-35	Manuel Ortiz	22	Ciudad Obregón, Sonora
29-35	Melissa Norzagaray	17	Culiacán, Sinaloa
29-35	Michelle Quintero	28	Ciudad Obregón, Sonora
36	Jorge Vázquez	20	Los Angeles, California

*Jesús Antonio Guerrero Cruz is Daniel Solís's real birth name and 46 was his real age when he was expelled.

Concerts
Rank	Contestant	10/04/09	10/11/09	10/18/09	10/25/09	11/01/09	11/08/09	11/15/09	11/22/09	11/29/09		12/06/09		12/13/09		12/20/09			
1	Giovanna	Me muero	En su lugar	Angel	El baile del gorila	Dejame ir	Amores extraños	Irremediable	Odio amarte	Manos al aire	A quien tú decidiste amar with Rod	Una canción no es suficiente	Florecita rockera	Pero me acuerdo de ti	Contigo si with Yahir (1G)	Oye	El cofrecito	Ángel	Ladronzuelo
2	Sebastián	Ángel	Déjame llorar	Persiana americana	Buleria	Angel	Esta ausencia	Que nivel de mujer	Caray	Esclavo de tus besos	La tortura with Luz'	Tengo to do excepto a ti	Música ligera	Hazme olvidar	A puro dolor with Samuel (5G)	La Bomba	Digale	No sé tú	Juliana
2	Napoleón	Mujeres	Sueña	Estos celos	Vive	Aquí estoy yo	Jamas	Regresa a mí	Volveré	Lo pasado pasado	Maracas with Mike	Te mando flores	Ven báilalo	Te conozco	Vivo por ella with Fabiola (6G)	Entrega total	Qué será	El día que me quieras	La cosa más bella
4	Agustín	Y tu te vas	Al final	Provocame	Kilómetros	Cuando nadie me ve	María	No me quiero enamorar	Hazme una señal	Hoy tengo ganas de ti	Colgado en tus manos with Fabiola	Usted se me llevo la vida	Procuro olvidarte	Almohada	Vivir lo nuestro with Toñita (1G)	Es mejor asi	Secreto de amor	Hasta ayer	Sueños
5	Menny	Todo cambió	No soy el aire	Vuelve	Corazón partido	Ahora quien	Te amo	Princesa tibetana	Cuando seas grande	Cielo	Dejame vivir with Jaccyve & Oscar	TBC	Te solté la rienda	A Dios le pido	Si no estas conmigo with Cynthia (4G)	Sueña	Burbujas de amor	Será que no me amas	
6	Oscar	Sin tantita pena	Te sigo amando	Color esperanza	Mi historia entre tus dedos	No	Un montón de estrellas	Entra en mi vida	Lluvia	Canta corazón	Dejame vivir with Jaccyve & Menny	Ya lo sé que tú Vas	Coleccionista de canciones	Me dediqué a perderte	Escondidos with Nadia (1G)	Como quién pierde una estrella	Te amo		
7	Fabiola	Devórame otra vez	Como olvidar	El amor coloca	Yo te pido amor	Techno cumbia	Malo	Loba	No soy una señora	Mi viejo	Colgado en tus manos with Agustín	Derroche	Mi gusto es	Aire	Me gusta estar contigo with Raúl (1G)	El hombre que yo amo			
8	Jaccyve	Si tu eres mi hombre y yo tu mujer	Oye mi canto	Ven conmigo	A quien	Mi alma te seguirá	No te pido flores	El tiempo de ti	A fuego lento	Cielo rojo	Dejame vivir with Oscar & Menny	Casi perfecto	Me quieres cotorrear		Aca Entre nos with Erasmo (4G)				
9	Mike	Amargo adiós	Procura	No me se rajar	Azul	Suavemente	Vive	Corazón espinado	Mi primer millón	Mi credo	Maracas with Napoleón	Payasito	Desvelado		El triste with Adrián (4G)				
10	Luz	Mi error mi fantasía	De contrabando	Techno cumbia	Sin el	Como tu	Traicionero	El príncipe	Mis ojos lloran por ti	Inolvidable	La tortura with Sebastián	Si la quieres							
11	Rodrigo	Mi dulce niña	Tocando fondo	Las curvas de esa chica	Antes	Heroe		Sueños	Latin Party	Y te vas	A quien tú decidiste amar with Giovanna								
12	Patricia	Al pasar	Bella traición	Mirame	Llama por favor	Amor de mis amores	La vida que va	Tristes recuerdos	Te quise tanto										
13	Alejandra Capellini	Las de la intuición	Una de dos	Una noche de copas	Me gustas mucho	Gloria	Causa y effecto	Celos											
14	María Alejandra	Amor a medias	En el 2000	Que hago yo	Tu veneno	Que te quería	La cigarra												
15	Daniel	De rodillas te pido	La chona	Si no te hubieras ido	Amor del bueno	Ni en defensa propia	A chillar an otra parte												
16	Adriana	Y yo sigo aquí	Isla bonita	Soledad	Matalos	Piel morena													
17-19	Mayrenne	El me mintió	Mentira	Huele a peligro	Que bello			Esta soledad											
17-19	Roy	Ojalá que te mueras	Busca amor	Por mujeres como tú	Fruta fresca			Tu cárcel											
17-19	Yadhira	Hoy ya me voy	Rosa pastel	Ya no quiero	Bandido														
20-23	Roberto	Y llegaste tú	El aventurero	Vete ya															
20-23	Brian	Piensa en ti	Que pides tu	La incondicional															
20-23	Carlos	Un buen perdedor	Noviembre sin ti	Ven dímelo															
20-23	Luis	La cima del cielo	Miedo	Bella															
24-28	Alex	Aire	No podrás																
24-28	Nicole	Me equivoqué	Candela																
24-28	Dafne	Acaríciame	Por cobardía																
24-28	Ingrid	Tu no eres para mí	Cómo hemos cambiado																
24-28	Mell	Como la flor	Será porqué te amo																
29-35	Kurt	Fotografía																	
29-35	Denisse	Mirame a los ojos																	
29-35	Manuel	Pégate																	
29-35	Alberto	A puro dolor																	
29-35	Melissa	Amor de Papel																	
29-35	Daniela	Rueda mi mente																	
29-35	Michelle	Ojalá que llueva café																	
36	Jorge	Did not show up																	

=== Season 8: The Bicentennial Generation (2010) ===
La Academia
- Starring: Arturo López Gavito; Olga Tañón; Chacho Gaytán
- No. of episodes: 15

Release
- Original network: Azteca 13
- Original release: 12 September – 19 December 2010
- Prizes; 1st: MX$1,000,000; 2nd: US$10,000; 3rd: US$5,000; Guest performers: Marta Sánchez, La Factoria, Monica Naranjo, Espinoza Paz, Yolanda Be Cool, María Conchita Alonso, Elvis Crespo, Tatiana, Olga Tañon, Eduardo Capetillo

Bicentennial Generation was the name given to this season in honor of the 200 years of Mexican independence. It began on 12 September 2010, featuring 49 contestants, and 10 finalists, marking an all-time high for the series. The Víctor Manuel Reyna Stadium in Tuxtla Gutiérrez, Chiapas, served as the setting for the finale for a third time. For the first time ever, two winners were announced: one was chosen by the panel of critics as well as Lolita Cortés and La Academia teachers, winning the International Prize of US$20,000; while the other was chosen by the viewers, actually winning La Academia: Bicentenario and MX$1 million, as well as a brand new Ford Focus.

Luis, Eri, Gerardo, Esmeralda, Carolina, Johnny, Daniel, Edgar, Paolo and Edu reached the finale held on 19 December 2010. Esmeralda Ugalde Mota was declared the eighth winner of La Academia. Paolo Ragone won the first and only International Prize.

Place	Contestants	Age	City
01	Esmeralda Ugalde	18	Río Verde, San Luis Potosí
01(2)*	Paolo Ragone	28	Buenos Aires, Argentina
02	Carolina Soto	27	Santiago, Chile
03	Edgar García	15	Tijuana, Baja California
04	Luis González	29	Tuxtla Gutiérrez, Chiapas
05	Edu del Prado	33	Valencia, Spain
06	Johnny Morales	30	Caracas, Venezuela
07	Daniel Riolobos	24	Mexico City
08	Gerardo Cuevas	25	Guadalajara, Jalisco
09	Eri Carranco	29	Monterrey, Nuevo León
10	María López	25	Mexicali, Baja California
11	Álvaro Bautista	23	Guadalajara, Jalisco
12	Benjamín Rosales	29	Tucumán, Argentina
13	Andrés Alejandre	25	Ensenada, Baja California
14	Deyra Cornejo	35	Villa Juárez, Sonora
15	Guillermo Martín	29	Valencia, Spain
16	Isabel Marín de León	18	Guatemala City, Guatemala
17	Belén Castorena	25	Cancún, Quintana Roo
18	Denise Faro	22	Rome, Italy
19	Gina Rivera	24	Veracruz, Veracruz
20-21
20-21	Eddie Bilalovic	22	Mexico City
20-21	Mark Lewin	22	Caracas, Venezuela
22-24	Jorge Tinoco	19	León, Guanajuato
22-24	Lizette Limón	17	Cabo San Lucas, Baja California Sur
22-24	Sandra Estrada	16	Pachuca, Hidalgo
25-32	Daniella Augspurg	19	San Salvador, El Salvador
25-32	Elaine Hernández	41	Havana, Cuba
25-32	Eduardo Jiménez	32	Mexico City
25-32	Karla Silva	19	Campeche, Campeche
25-32	Leonardo Ruiz	27	Morelia, Michoacán
25-32	Leonel Regata	21	Havana, Cuba
25-32	Rosendo Robles	22	Glendale, California
25-32	Ventura Esquiviaz	20	Tepatitlán, Jalisco
33-49
33-49	Brisa Carillo	17	Chihuahua, Chihuahua
33-49	Carmen Vásquez	16	Tlaxcala, Tlaxcala
33-49	David Duclaud	26	Cuernavaca, Morelos
33-49	Dayana Falcón	21	Havana, Cuba
33-49	Florentina González	31	Guadalajara, Jalisco
33-49	Josue Bravo	26	Puebla, Puebla
33-49	Lupita Infante	23	Tijuana, Baja California
33-49	Mariana Niebla	23	Durango, Durango
33-49	Nicolas Padilla	19	Colima, Colima
33-49	Paloma Naya	18	Tepic, Nayarit
33-49	Paola Bustamante	22	Querétaro, Querétaro
33-49	Pepe Betancourt	28	Torreón, Coahuila
33-49	Santa Degyves	37	Acapulco, Guerrero
33-49	Santiago Pérez	18	Oaxaca, Oaxaca
33-49	Sonia Mayorga	22	Ciudad Madero, Tamaulipas
33-49	Verónica Ramos	27	Ensenada, Baja California

* Winner of the International Prize

Concerts
Rank	Contestant	09/12/2010	19 September 2010	26 September 2010	10/03/2010	10 October 2010	17 October 2010	24 October 2010	31 October 2010	11/07/2010	14 November 2010	21 November 2010		28 November 2010	12 May 2010		12 December 2010		19 December 2010	
1	Esmeralda	Bandido with Lizette	Y lo busqué	Mátalos	Me gusta estar contigo	Aire	Si quieres verme llorar	Si te vas	Lo que una chica por amor es capaz	Aires del Mayab	Hombres al borde de un ataque	Me nace del corazón	Estoy enamorada with Johnny	No me arrepiento de este amor	Te quedó grande la yegua		Cómo me haces falta	Déjame vivir with Raúl (1G)	El pastor	Mi error, mi fantasia
1*	Paolo	El yerbatero with Benjamín	Mi princesa	Lloviendo estrellas	Me enamoré de tí	Inolvidable	No para de llover	Mientes	Esclavo de tus besos	Como quien pierde una estrella	Hazme una señal	Se murió el amor		Bésame	La camisa negra	La tortura with María	Te sigo amando	Estar contigo with Cynthia (4G)	No	Dígale
2	Carolina	Mi tierra with Isabel	Bandolero	Detrás de mi ventana	Te estás pasando	Mentiras	Un sueño impossible	Falsas esperanzas	Ese hombre	Sobreviviré	Él me mintió	El chico del apartamento 512		Gracias a Dios	Mudanzas		Oye	Vivo por ella with Carlos (3G)	El amor coloca	Sola otra vez
3	Edgar	Me va a extrañar with Álvaro	Entra en mi vida	Si no te hubieras ido	Vive	Suavemente	Palabras tristes	Te presumo	12 Rosas	El próximo viernes	Cuando seas grande	La maldita primavera		Tatuajes	La chica del bikini azul	La calle with Edu	En esta primavera	A quien tu decidiste amar with Giovanna (7G)	Hasta que me olvides	Cuando seas grande
4	Luis	En los puritos huesos with Santiago	Mi credo	Historia de un taxi	Cómo me duele	Por amarte así	Amargo adiós	La manzanita	La differencia	Mi primer millón	A chillar an otra parte	Lo pasado, pasado		El enamorado	Volveré		La María	24 horas with Adrián (4G)	Mi primer millón	Sin evidencia
5	Edu	Corazón partío with Guillermo	Torero	Ave María	Ángel		Que vida la mia	Cardio	Bruja Hada	Me enamora	La media vuelta	Danza kuduro		Bulería	A puro dolor	La calle with Edgar	Todo cambió	Bella señora with Samuel (5G)	Ave María	Vuelve
6	Johnny	Mi niña bonita with Mark	Alucinado	¿Y cómo es él?	Guapa	A Dios le pido	Si tu supieras	Amor, amor, amor	Momentos	Dímelo	Jamás	Fuego de noche, nieve de día	Estoy enamorada with Esmeralda	Ingrata	Qué precio tiene el cielo		Como yo nadie te ha amado	Entra en mi vida with Laura (1G) & Dulce (3G)	Aquí estoy yo	Mi Niña Bonita
7	Daniel	El viajero with Eduardo & Pepe	Sin tantita pena	Aléjate de mí	Pero qué necesidad	Amor eterno	Soldado del amor	El triste	La vida loca	Qué nivel de mujer	Lo que tú necesitas	Dime que me quieres		Perdóname	¿Quién piensa en tí?		¿Qué voy a hacer sin tí?	No me ames with G6 (MaFernanda, Valeria, Fátima & Alex) (6G)	Ya es muy tarde	
8	Gerardo	Por tu amor with Rosendo	El aventurero	Vive	Víveme y Déjame vivir	Tocando fondo	Más que tu amigo	Un montón de estrellas	Hoy tengo ganas de tí	Amarte a la Antigua	Mis ojos lloran por tí	Amante bandido		Me encantas	No soy el aire		Ayer pedí	Mi ciudad with Nadia (1G)	No me sé rajar	
9	Eri	Te aprovechas with María & Lupita	Amor de tres	Sobreviviré	Yo no soy esa mujer	Yo sin tu amor	Inolvidable	Luna mágica	Caray	Amor a la mexicana	La ocasión para amarnos	Lo siento mi amor	Celos with Benjamín	Todos me miran	Pero me acuerdo de tí		No debes jugar	Pasión with César (3G)	¿Cómo te va mi amor?	
10	María	Te aprovechas with Eri & Lupita	Equivocada	Volverte an amar	Soledad	Inevitable	Sueños rotos	Reina de corazones	Loca	Barco a Venus	En su lugar	Espacio sidereal		Nada de más	Se me olvidó otra vez	La tortura with Paolo				
11	Álvaro	Me va a extrañar with Edgar		Por debajo de la mesa	Labios de miel	Estuve	Como yo te amo	Nunca voy an olvidarte		Tú no sabes qué tanto	Es mejor así	Sentimental		Se me va la voz						
12	Benjamín	El yerbatero with Paolo	Pégate	Mi dulce niña	Desde cuando	Salomé	Tiempo para enamorarnos	Mi gran noche	Princesa tibetana	Sombras	Bom Bom	Antes	Celos with Eri							
13	Andrés	Estos celos with Eddie	Noviembre sin tí	Me dediqué a perderte	Disculpe usted	¿Ahora quién?	Nada de nada	Por mujeres como tú	Lo intentamos	La cima del cielo	Ámame hasta con los dientes									
14	Deyra	Ahora que estuviste lejos with Paloma	De contrabando	Cheque en blanco	No soy una señora			Me Muero	No me queda más	Que nadie sepa mi sufrir	Míralo, mírala									
15	Guillermo	Corazón partío with Edu	Tan enamorado	Tu nombre me sabe a hierba	Valió la pena	Vivir así es morir de amor	Persiana americana	Estoy enamorado												
16	Isabel	Mi tierra with Carolina	Mi amor, amor	Daría	Amor a medias	Afortunadamente no eres tú	Ángel	Adelante corazón												
17	Belén	Quítame a ese hombre with Verónica	Noche de copas	Huele a peligro	Bombón asesino	Tú	No te pido flores													
18	Denise	El sol no regresa with Daniella	Víveme	Las pequeñas cosas	Dopamina	Ya no quiero		Me Muero												
19	Gina	Amiga mía with Santa	¿Qué te pasa?	Gitana	Dejame volver contigo			Me Muero												
20-21	Eddie	Estos celos with Andrés	Usted se me llevó la vida	¿Quién de los dos será?	La chica de humo															
20-21	Mark	Mi niña bonita with Jhonny		El amor	Yo no sé mañana															
22-24	Jorge	Así es la vida with Leonel & Josué	TBC	Dime ven																
22-24	Sandra	Tú no eres para mí with Brisa	Ven conmigo	Me hipnotizas				Me Muero												
22-24	Lizette	Bandido with Esmeralda	Piel morena	Cinco minutos																
25-32	Eduardo	El viajero with Daniel & Pepe	Tu cárcel																	
25-32	Leonel	Así es la vida with Jorge & Josué	Lo que no fue no será																	
25-32	Rosendo	Por tu amor with Gerardo	Ojalá que te mueras																	
25-32	Daniella	El sol no regresa with Denisse	Ni rosas ni juguetes					Me Muero												
25-32	Ventura	Tu boca with David	A labio dulce																	
25-32	Elaine	El hierberito with Dayana	La negra tiene tumbao																	
25-32	Leonardo	No tengo dinero with Nicolás	Secreto de amor																	
25-32	Karla	Me gustas mucho with Florentina	Antes muerta que sencilla																	
33-49	Paloma	Ahora que estuviste lejos with Deyra																		
33-49	Verónica	Quítame a ese hombre with Belén																		
33-49	Florentina	Me gustas mucho with Karla																		
33-49	Nicolás	No tengo dinero with Leonardo																		
33-49	Santa	Amiga mía with Gina																		
33-49	Pepe	El viajero with Daniel & Eduardo																		
33-49	Dayana	El hierberito with Elaine																		
33-49	Josué	Así es la vida with Jorge & Leonel																		
33-49	Carmen	México lindo y querido with Paola																		
33-49	Paola	México lindo y querido with Carmen																		
33-49	Lupita	Te aprovechas with Eri & María																		
33-49	David	Tu boca with Ventura																		
33-49	Santiago	En los puritos huesos with Luis																		
33-49	Brisa	Tú no eres para mí with Sandra						Me Muero												
33-49	Mariana	¿Dónde están? with Sonia																		
33-49	Sonia	¿Dónde están? with Mariana																		

=== Season 9: 2011 Generation (2011) ===
La Academia
- Starring: Arturo López Gavito; Lolita Cortés; Chacho Gaytán
- No. of episodes: 18

Release
- Original network: Azteca 13
- Original release: 21 August – 18 December 2011
- Prizes; 1st: MX$648,437.50; 2nd: Recording Contract; 3rd: Recording Contract; Guest performers: La Toya Jackson, Village People, Lynda Carter, Juan Manuel Márquez, Manny Pacquiao, Franco De Vita, Enrique Guzmán, Pamela Anderson, Alizée, Lucenzo, Yuridia

La Academia 2011 premiered on 21 August 2011, and it was the first reality show to be aired in 3D. It featured 35 contestants. The season was led by Eduardo Capetillo, and hosted by his wife Bibi Gaytán accompanied by Rafael Araneda. During the middle of the competition, on 26 October, Eduardo Capetillo announced to the contestants that Magda Rodriguez was no longer the producer (she was fired due to low ratings). Juan Navarrete became the new producer. At the end of the 11th. Concert, Eduardo Capetillo announced that he would look for new contestants to join the competition. On the 12th. and 13th. Concert, 6 new contestants (Cecilia, Dianela, Héctor, Valeria, Alfonso, Gaby) were brought to the competition. After involving La Academia on a personal matter, Eduardo Capetillo and Bibi Gaytán were fired on 7 December 2011, 2 weeks before the finale. It was announced Julio Preciado would take his place as principal for the remaining weeks of the competition and Ingrid Coronado will return to host the semifinal and finale. The finale was held on 18 December, once again in Víctor Manuel Reyna Stadium in Tuxtla Gutiérrez, Chiapas. The winner received MX$500,000 in addition to the cash prize accumulated over the course of the competition and a recording contract, as well as a brand new Honda Accord.

Emanuel, Cecilia, Gustavo, Ronald, Gil, Yanilen, Erick, Hancer, Pablo & Carmen reached the finale. Erick Sandoval was declared the ninth winner of La Academia.

Place	Contestants	Age	City
01	Erick Sandoval	26	Mexicali, Baja California
02	Pablo Balzano	27	Buenos Aires, Argentina
03	Carmen Rios	25	San Francisco, California
04	Gil Álvarez	23	Guadalajara, Jalisco
05	Ronald Martínez	31	Caracas, Venezuela
06 - 10*	Gustavo Cornejo	30	Chicago, Illinois
06 - 10*	Emmanuel Peña	15	Cabo San Lucas, Baja California Sur
06 - 10*	Cecilia de la Cueva	25	Mexico City
06 - 10*	Yanilen Díaz	25	Havana, Cuba
06 - 10*	Hancer Pérez	19	Guatemala City, Guatemala
11	Valeria Cox	26	Santiago, Chile
12	Alfonso Cravioto	33	Mexico City
13	Héctor Ruiz	24	Tuxla Gutiérrez, Chiapas
14	Lizbeth Colin	15	Acapulco, Guerrero
15	Gaby Albo	20	Mexico City
16	Denisha Audifred	29	Torreón, Coahuila
17	Dianela	26	Durango, Durango
18	Melissa Barrera	21	Monterrey, Nuevo León
19	Paco Zazueta	24	Ciudad Obregón, Sonora
20-22	Jose Antonio Mora	23	Quito, Ecuador
20-22	Javi Baerga	23	San Juan, Puerto Rico
20-22	Jesus Falcón	26	Macuspana, Tabasco
23-24	Eduardo D' Esezarate	23	Puebla, Puebla
23-24	Tadeo Bustamante	29	Cancún, Quintana Roo
25	Gaby Luna	18	Durango, Durango
26	Frank Díaz	19	Los Angeles, California
27	Dariela Vallejo	25	Guadalajara, Jalisco
28	Yazmín Sanchez	15	Tempoal, Veracruz
29	Huicho Pérez	15	Chihuahua, Chihuahua
30	Mariana Balquiarena	20	Los Angeles, California
31	Noé Varela	18	Houston, Texas
32-33	Alan Martin	21	Tepatitlán, Jalisco
32-33	Ceci Magaña	22	Guadalajara, Jalisco
34-36	Bárbara Ibarra	16	Monterrey, Nuevo León
34-36	Karen Lopez	21	Culiacán, Sinaloa
34-36	Sergio Aguilar	21	Guadalajara, Jalisco
37-41	Jacqueline Solis	28	Guadalajara, Jalisco
37-41	Yamileth Hernández	21	Poza Rica, Veracruz
37-41	Arón Manzanero	19	Mérida, Yucatán
37-41	Giselle Rodriguez	18	Hermosillo, Sonora
37-41	Elisa Castellanos	17	Tuxtla Gutiérrez, Chiapas

* The specific rank wasn't revealed, but the contestants are listed in order of elimination

Concerts
Rank	Contestant	08/21/11	08/28/11	09/04/11	09/11/11	09/18/11	09/25/11	10/02/11	10/09/11	10/16/11	10/23/11	10/30/11	11/06/11	11/13/11		11/20/11		11/27/11		12/04/11		12/11/11		12/18/11			
1	Erick	Secreto de amor with Eduardo	Mi funeral with Gustavo	Corazón partío with Paco	La chica del humo with Hancer	Escapar		Ayer te pedi	Estuve	Pero te vas arrepentir	La incondicional	No podras	Aire	He venido a pedirte perdón	Miedo	No me ames with Carmen		Será que no me amas		El ausente	Lloraré las penas	Bum bum	La verdolaga with Raul (1G)	Qué nivel de mujer	Abeja reina	Te vi venir	Tatuajes
2	Pablo	Yo no sé mañana with Paco	Danza kuduro with J.Antonio	Vuelve with Gil	Lloviendo estrellas with Emanuel	A dios le pido	Dime ven	Ave Maria	Persiana americana	Para no verte mas	Tu carcel	Heroe	Suave	Otro día más sin verte		Princesa tibetana		Que vida la mia	Como yo nadie te ha amado	Fuego de noche, nieve de dia		Sueña	Solo le pido a dios with Estrella (1G)	Penélope	Ya lo pasado pasado	Alucinado	Y como es el
3	Carmen	Bad romance with Tadeo	Es ella mas que yo? with Melissa	Inolvidable	Rabiosa with Yanilen	Te quedo grande la yegua	Oops!...I did it again	Las de la intuicion	Devorame otra vez	Ay amor	Querida socia	El chico del apartamento 512	Quitame an ese hombre	Que Bello		No me ames with Erick		Toxic		Simplemente amigos		Como tu mujer	A puro dolor with Tobby (6&7G)	No me puedo quejar	Mirame	Si una vez	Por cobardia
4	Gil	Aléjate de mí with J.Antonio	A donde vamos a parar	Vuelve with Pablo	Amarte es un placer with Ronald	Usted se me llevo la vida	Sway	Todo cambio	Quien piensa en ti	Como quien pierde una estrella	Toda la vida	Te amo	La cima del cielo	Tan enamorados		No basta		Te mando flores		Si tú supieras		Mientes tan bien	Sin miedo a nada with Carolina (8G)	Cielo	Derecho de antigüedad	Antes	
5	Ronald	Llueve el amor with Noé & Hancer	Estos celos with Eduardo	Provócame with Alan	Amarte es un placer with Gil	A puro dolor	Livin' la vida loca	Sueños	Para siempre	Tu boca	Dímelo	Entregate	Valió la pena	Dígale		Como un lobo		Soldado del amor		Y tú te vas		Palabra de honor	Cuando me enamoro with Cesar (3G)	Y hubo alguien	Deja		
6-10	Gustavo	Golpes en el corazón with Melissa	Mi funeral with Eduardo	Llamado de emergencia with Noé	México en la piel with Lizbeth	Mas que tu amigo	Mi credo	La jaula de oro	Amargo adios	He renunciado a ti	Prometiste	Si no te hubieras ido	La puerta negra	Ójala que te mueras		¿Y todo para qué?	La pareja ideal with Gaby	Lo dejaria todo		Morenita		Por amarte	Acá entre nos with Nadia (1G) & Esmeralda (8G)	Lo que no fue será			
6-10	Emmanuel	Cucurrucucú Paloma with Lizbeth	Tu angelito soy yo with Yanilen	La de la mochila azul with Huicho	Lloviendo estrellas with Pablo	Decidete		Por amarte asi	Se nos murio el amor	Baby	Me gusta to do de ti	Desvelado	Y llegaste tu	Me Encantas	Mañana	Con todos menos conmigo		A labio dulce		Sueña	Es mejor asi	Duele	Te quiero tanto with Giovanna (7G)	El siete mares			
6-10	Cecilia												I will always love you	El sol no regresa		Candela		Te dejo en libertad		Mentira	Gitana	Sola otra vez	Escondidos with Paolo (8G)	Mi reflejo			
6-10	Yanilen	El Hierberito Moderno	Tu angelito soy yo with Emanuel	No tengo dinero with Frank	Rabiosa with Carmen	Mi amor, amor	Como Olvidar	Amor a la mexicana	Vestida de azúcar	Me gustas tanto	Conga	Tu no eres para mi	Oye mi canto	Guantanamera		Inevitable		Piel morena		Derroche		Hombres al borde de un ataque	Vivir lo nuestro with Edu (8G)	Mi tierra			
6-10	Hancer	Llueve El amor with Noé & Ronald	Mientes with Paco	Nunca voy an olvidarte with Gaby	La chica del humo with Erick	Se me va la voz	Al fin te encontre	El Yerbatero	Inolvidable	Obsesión	No me digas que no	Mujeres	Azul	La Bilirrubina	Otra como tú	Bambú		Otra vez	Ángel	Sirena		Buleria	Te conozco with Napoleon (7G)	Todo lo que hago lo hago por ti			
11	Valeria													Falsas esperanzas		Ciega sordomuda		Adelante corazon	Pero me acuerdo de ti	Ese hombre	El amor coloca	Tu peor error	Golpes en el corazón with Erasmo (4G)				
12	Alfonso													Por ti volaré		Gavilan o paloma	Vivo por ella with Denisha	Abrázame									
13	Héctor												El Triste	Por amarte		Te amo		Nada valgo sin tu amor	Bruja hada								
14	Lizbeth	Cucurrucucú paloma with Emanuel	Mi error mi fantasia	Volcán with Jesús	México en la piel with Gustavo				La Differencia	Cielo rojo	Paloma negra	La media vuelta	La cigarra	Mátalos		Tú								Que te vaya bonito			
15-16	Gaby													Ángel		Ya no quiero	La pareja ideal with Gustavo										
15-16	Denisha	De mí enamórate with Dariela & Frank	Hacer el amor con otro with Tadeo	Qué nos pasó with Javi	Mentiras	Sobreviviré	Déjame volver contigo	En su lugar	Odio amarte	Hoy ya me voy	La ocasión para amarnos	El me mintio	Rolling in the deep	Óye		Como te va mi amor	Vivo por ella with Alfonso							I'm Every Woman			
17	Dianela												Si tu no estás	Entre tú y mil mares													
18	Melissa	Golpes en el corazón with Gustavo	Es ella mas que yo with Carmen	Hot N Cold with Mariana	Cuando me enamoro with Paco	I will survive	Volverte an Amar	Firework	Ese hombre no se toca	En cambio no	Amor del papel	De mujer a mujer	Estes en donde estes	Desesperada	Gracias a Dios												
19	Paco	Yo no sé mañana with Pablo	Mientes with Hancer	Corazón partío with Erick	Cuando me enamoro with Melissa	A chillar an otra parte	No	Invisible	Guapa	La locura	El aventurero	Me dedique a perderte	Que voy a hacer con mi amor														
20-22	J.Antonio	Aléjate de mí with Gil	Danza kuduro with Pablo	No me se rajar with Eduardo	Que precio tiene el cielo with Javi				Aquí estoy yo	Ahora quien	Respira	Atado a tu amor															
20-22	Javi	Más with Sergio	Peligro with Jesús	Qué nos pasó with Denisha	Que precio tiene el cielo with J.Antonio	Just the way you are	Claridad	Torero	Mi historia entre tus dedos	Dame una señal chiquita	Me enamora	Lluvia															
20-22	Jesús	Quien como tú with Jacqueline	Peligro with Javi	Volcán with Lizbeth	Jamás	Te sigo amando		Besame	El amor	Amor del bueno	Me va extranar	Amante bandido															
23-24	Eduardo	Secreto de amor with Erick	Estos celos with Ronald	No Me Se Rajar with J.Antonio	El enamorado	Hoy tengo ganas de ti	Por mujeres como tu	Volvere	Quien te quiere como yo	Asi es la vida	La cita																
23-24	Tadeo	Bad romance with Carmen	Hacer el amor con otro with Denisha	Like a virgin	¿A quién le importa? with Gaby	Algo mas	Cinco minutos	(I Can't Get No) Satisfaction	Mala hierba	Me quieres cotorrear	Ni tu ni nadie																
25	Gaby	Autos, moda y rock and roll with Bárbara & Giselle	Vuela mas alto with Sergio	Nunca voy an olvidarte with Hancer	¿A quién le importa? with Tadeo	Impermeable			La Cigarra	Fanfarrón																	
26	Frank	De mí enamórate with Denisha & Dariela	Sexy chick with Noé	No tengo dinero with Yanilen	New York	Un monton de estrellas	Innocente pobre amiga	Entra en mi vida	Sentimental																		
27	Dariela	De mí enamórate with Denisha & Frank	Vivir asi es morir de amor with Huicho	Luna mágica with Cecy	Huele a peligro with Melissa	Irremediable	Daria	La maldita primavera																			
28	Yazmín	Equivocada with Cecy	Muriendo lento with Alan	Quinceañera	Mi dulce niña with Huicho	Somewhere over the rainbow	Ángel																				
29	Huicho	Por ti volaré	Vivir asi es morir de amor with Dariela	La de la mochila azul with Emanuel	Mi dulce niña with Yazmín	La Bikina																					
30	Mariana	De contrabando with Elisa	Que te queria with Karen	Hot N Cold with Melissa	Huele a peligro with Dariela				Si tu eres mi hombre y yo tu mujer																		
31	Noé	Llueve El amor with Hancer & Ronald	Sexy chick with Frank	Llamado de emergencia with Gustavo	El enamorado																						
32-33	Alan	Esclavo de tus besos with Aron	Muriendo lento with Yazmín	Provócame with Ronald																							
32-33	Cecy	Equivocada with Yazmín	Los amantes with Barbara	Luna mágica with Dariela																							
34-36	Bárabara	Autos, moda y rock and roll with Gaby & Giselle	Los amantes with Cecy																								
34-36	Karen	Un nuevo amor with Yamileth	Que te queria with Mariana																								
34-36	Sergio	Más with Javi	Vuela mas alto with Gaby																								
37-41	Áron	Esclavo de tus besos with Alan																									
37-41	Elisa	De contrabando with Mariana							Así fué																		
37-41	Giselle	Autos, moda y rock and roll with Cecy & Barbara																									
37-41	Jacqueline	Quien como tú with Jesús							Yo te pido amor																		
37-41	Yamileth	Un nuevo amor with Karen																									

=== Season 10: The Decade Generation (2012) ===
La Academia
- Starring: Julio Preciado; Marta Sánchez; Cruz Martínez; Yahir
- No. of episodes: 17

Release
- Original network: Azteca 13
- Original release: 26 August – 16 December 2012
- Prizes; 1st: MX$1,000,000; 2nd: MX$300,000; 3rd: MX$200,000; Guest performers: Jon Secada, María Fernanda & La Sonora Santanera, Franco De Vita, La Factoría, Los Horóscopos de Durango, Obie Bermúdez

The Decade Generation premiered on 26 August 2012, celebrating the tenth anniversary of La Academia. Fernando De Solar and his wife Ingrid Coronado were introduced as the new hosts of La Academia. On August, 16, it was confirmed that the four judges will be Marta Sánchez, Julio Preciado, Cruz Martínez and First Generation's fourth place, Yahir. Chacho Gaytán, serve as the Principal of this generation. In this season, the contestants were no longer isolated as they could use the social media to keep in touch with fans and family. On September, 16, the winner of The First Generation, Myriam, joined the judges panel. The finale was held on December, 16, in Tuxtla Gutiérrez, Chiapas. The Polyforum Chiapas, served for the first time as the setting of the final concert. The winner received a Recording Contract and MX$1,000,000.

Alexis, Chucho, Manuel, Rubí, Santana & Selene reached the finale. Alexis Montoya was declared the tenth winner of La Academia.

Place	Contestants	Age	City
01	Alexis Montoya	26	Caborca, Sonora
02	Chucho Rivas	13	El Rosario, Sinaloa
03	Selene Fitch	23	La Paz, Baja California Sur
04	Santana Olvera	21	Ciudad Mante, Tamaulipas
05	Manuel Aguilar	25	Tuxpan, Veracruz
06	Rubí Mendivil	19	Ahome, Sinaloa
07	Yara Rey	27	Havana, Cuba
08	Hacib Samir	29	Mexico City
09	Maru Barrios	33	Mexico City
10	Francisco 'Pako' Madrid	31	Los Mochis, Sinaloa
11	Gaba Flores	29	Monterrey, Nuevo León
12	Kevin Ruano	20	Guatemala City, Guatemala
13	Azucena del Toro	31	Cocula, Jalisco
14	Gabriela Maldonado	41	Buenos Aires, Argentina
15	Freddy Sandoval	35	Uruapan, Michoacán
16	Diana Molina	21	Martinez de la Torre, Veracruz
17	Sandra Arcos	29	Mexico City
18	Liz & Mar Rodriguez	34/14	Tijuana, Baja California
19	Erik Torrel	26	Puebla, Puebla
20	Mario Orellana	18	San Salvador, El Salvador

Concerts
Rank	Contestant	08/26/12	09/02/12	09/09/12	09/16/12	09/23/12	09/30/12	10/07/12	10/14/12	10/21/12	10/28/12	11/04/12	11/11/12	11/18/12	11/25/12	12/02/12	12/09/12	12/16/12	
1	Alexis	Secreto de amor	Estos celos	Qué voy a hacer sin tu amor	México lindo y querido	Mujeres	Caruso	Ojalá que te mueras	Hasta que te conocí	Ya lo pasado, pasado	No	El patrón	No se tú	Si tú no vuelves	Prometiste	Héroe	Quiéreme	Como quien pierde una estrella	La locura
2	Chucho	Ángel	La mejor	Sueña	Mi dulce niña	Creo en ti	Baby	Dime que me quieres	Yesterday	El sinaloense	No podras	Con todos menos conmigo	Inolvidable	Te mando flores	Por amarte	Con ella	Solo importas tu	Ya es muy tarde	Como yo nadie te ha amado
3	Selene	Yo te pido amor	Tú	Rolling in the deep	Amor a la mexicana	Ese hombre	Ven conmigo	El amor que soñe	Me voy	Detrás de mi ventana	La media vuelta	Me va a extrañar	Volverte a ver	Será que no me amas	Tu peor error	A quien le importa	Las de la intuicion	No se vivir si no es contigo	De mi enamórate
4	Santana	Esclavo de tus besos	Volver a amar	Próvocame	La Bikina	Chica de humo	La fuerza del corazón	Bulería	Tu de que vas?	Si no te hubieras ido	Digale	Sueña	Por mujeres como tu	Un hombre normal	Tu nombre	Gritar	El centro de mi corazon	Desnúdate	
5	Manuel	Antes	Quién como tú	Ángel	TBC	Just The Way You Are	Bésame	La incondicional	What Makes You Beautiful	Te amo	Tears in Heaven	Dímelo	My way	Ven dímelo	DJ Got Us Falling in Love	Para siempre	Living On a Prayer	Without You	
6	Rubi	Lo que son las cosas	Mírame	Girls Just Want To Have Fun	La de la mala suerte	Te quedo grande la yegua	Inevitable	Mi amor amor	Sola otra vez	Ángel	Call Me Maybe	Por ti	A puro dolor	De dónde sacas eso	Déjame ir	Si te vas	Bailar nada más	Inolvidable	
7	Yara	Víveme	Si tú eres mi hombre	I have nothing	Me nace del corazon	Mi tierra	Bad romance	Falsas esperanzas	Lo siento mi amor	Devórame otra vez	Que manera de quererte	Si tú no estás aquí	Someone Like You	Amanecí otra vez	When Love Takes Over	Si te vas			
8	Hacib	Yo no se mañana	Ahora quién	Corazón partío	Nunca voy an olvidarte	24 horas	Procura	Duele	Tu mirada	Y tú te vas	Valió la pena	Acabame de matar	Abrazame muy fuerte	El abandonado	Te sigo amando				
9	Maru	Volverte an amar	Quítame ese hombre	Desesperada	A fuego lento	Gitana	Miénteme	Price tag	Cuando baja la marea	Man! I Feel Like a Woman	El amor coloca	Tú	Like a prayer	Serenata Huasteca					
10	Pako	Laura no está	Mientes	Bailamos	El aventurero	Pégate	Summer of 69	Que no quede huella	Ave María	Princesa tibetana	Desesperado	Tu cárcel	Labios compartidos						
11	Gaba	Equívocada	De mujer a mujer	Te amo	Como se cura una herida	Firework	Oye	We found love	La differencia	Total Eclipse of The Heart	Born This Way	Suerte							
12	Kevin	Aléjate de Mí	Tu amor me hace bien	Canta corazón	Mi niña bonita	Burbujas de amor	Escapar	Lloviendo estrellas	Pero te vas arrepentir	Que nivel de mujer	Salome								
13	Azucena	Afortunadamente no eres tú	Tiempo de ti	Si te vas	Con la misma piedra	Mi credo	Corre	Sweet Child O'mine	Bandido	Mírala, míralo									
14	Gabriela	La traviata	Nesum Dorma	Con Te Partirò	Cucurrucucú Paloma	Recuerdo	No llores por mi Argentina	Júrame	Omio babbino caro										
15	Freddy	Ya lo sé que tú te vas	Aquí estoy yo	Hubo alguien	Debo hacerlo	Te presumo	Un monton de estrellas	Persiana Americana											
16	Diana	Como olvidar	No me enseñaste	No soy una señora	La Cigarra	Ya te olvidé	Mi corazón seguirá												
17	Sandra	No te pido flores	Adelante corazón	El sol no regresa	El proximo viernes	El chico del apartamento 512													
18	Liz & Mar	Pero me acuerdo de tí	Yo no te pido la luna	Amor eterno	Amor prohibido	Liz: Que ganas de no verte nunca más													
19	Erik	No lo beses	La cima del cielo	Azul															
20	Mario	Cosa mas bella	El amor																
21-26	Edi	Es mejor así																	
21-26	Gustavo	Y llegaste tú																	
21-26	Joss	Lo dejaría todo																	
21-26	Kassandra	Que te quería																	
21-26	Laura	Me muero																	
21-26	Luis	Mátalas																	

== Reboot Generations ==
=== Season 11 (2018) ===
La Academia
- Starring: Arturo López Gavito; Edwin Luna; Edith Márquez; Horacio Villalobos
- No. of episodes: 14

Release
- Original network: Azteca Uno
- Original release: 8 July – 7 October 2018
- Prizes; 1st: MX$1,000,000; 2nd: Recording Contract; 3rd: Recording Contract; Guest performers: Edith Marquez, Pedro Fernandez, Amaia Montero, Aida Cuevas, Susana Zabaleta, Kalimba

Season 11 premiered on 8 July 2018, as TV Azteca's celebration of its twenty-five year anniversary. This generation serves as the return of one of its most successful formats, according to statements by the content director, Alberto Ciurana. On 14 May, it was announced that Adal Ramones would return to the small screen as the host of La Academia, after joining TV Azteca almost three years after leaving their competitor, Televisa. On 4 July 2018, the names of the contestants and teachers of the new season of La Academia were revealed through social media accounts of the reality show, which would be led by Héctor Martínez, the principal of the First Generation of the show. Later that day, it was announced that the new panel of judges would be formed by Arturo López Gavito, Horacio Villalobos, Edwin Luna and Edith Márquez. The finale was held on 7 October, in which the winner received a recording contract and MX$1,000,000.

Katheryn, Dalia, Alexis, Paola & Silvia reached the finale. Paola Chuc was declared the eleventh winner of La Academia.

Place	Contestants	Age	City
01	Paola Chuc	20	Guatemala City, Guatemala
02	Alexis Bonifaz	24	Mapastepec, Chiapas
03	Katheryn Venegas	22	Choluteca, Honduras
04	Dalia Duarte	30	Tijuana, Baja California
05	Silvia Zepeda	19	Apatzingán, Michoacán
06	Diego Almonte	22	Santiago, Chile
07	Fernando Davila	24	Torreón, Coahuila
08	Isboseth Garza	24	Matamoros, Tamaulipas
09	Marian Herrera	20	Mexico City
10	Ana Samano	20	Puerto Vallarta, Jalisco
11	Adolfo Esponda	21	Culiacán, Sinaloa
12	Daniela Montes	20	Tijuana, Baja California
13	Montserrat Ibarra	25	Zapopan, Jalisco
14	Montserrat Torales	24	Gomez Palacios, Durango

Concerts
Rank	Contestant	07/08/18	07/15/18	07/22/18	07/29/18	08/05/18	08/12/18	08/19/18		08/26/18	09/02/18		09/09/18		09/16/18	09/23/18		09/30/18		10/07/18		
1	Paola	Tu Falta de Querer with Daniela	Manías	Ya No Quiero	Tiene Espinas el Rosal	Mi Razón de Ser	Así es la Vida	Chandelier		Me Gustas Mucho	A Fuego Lento		Lloviendo Estrellas		No Volveré	No Me Enseñaste	Vivo Por Ella with Alexis	Me va a Extrañar	El Sirenito	Chandelier	Se Me Olvido Otra Vez	En Cambio No
2	Alexis	Estos Celos with Fernando	Santa Lucía	Hazme Olvidarla	Adiós Amor	Mientes	Yo era el Amor de su Vida	Por Una Mujer Bonita		Querida	Hoy Tengo Ganas de Ti		¿A Dónde Vamos A Parar?		Cielo Rojo	El Color de tus Ojos	Vivo Por Ella with Paola	Todo a Pulmón	De Los Pies a la Cabeza	¿A Dónde Vamos A Parar?	Hasta Que Te Conocí	Afuera Está Lloviendo
3	Katheryn	Aléjate de Mí with Isbo	Lo Que Son Las Cosas	Corazón Bipolar	Dónde Está el Amor	Que Ganas de No Verte Nunca Más	No Me Acuerdo	Como Tu Mujer		De Mi Enamórate	Pero Me Acuerdo de Ti	Fuiste Tú with Fernando	Las de la Intuición		Que Te Vaya Bonito	La Cima del Cielo		Culpable o No	La Mejor de Todas	De Mi Enamórate	Así Fué	Lo Siento Mi Amor
4	Dalia	Que Nadie Sepa Mi Sufrir with Karen	Lobo	Por Amarte Así	Labios Compartidos	La Trampa	Tan Enamorados	Que Bello		Abrázame Muy Fuerte	La Maldita Primavera		Víveme	Cosas del Amor with Silvia	La Malagueña	Ahora Quién		Sin Tantita Pena	I Will Survive	Víveme	Ya Lo Sé Que Tú Te Vas	
5	Silvia	Volverte a Amar with Ana	Y Todo Para Qué	Ya Te Olvidé	Un Nuevo Amor	Cosa Más Bella	No Me Doy Por Vencido	No Me Queda Más		Te Voy a Olvidar	Sin El		Ay Amor	Cosas del Amor with Dalia	Cucurrucucú Paloma	La Gata Bajo la Lluvia		Vivir Asi es Morir de Amor	Ese Hombre	Cucurrucucú Paloma		
6	Diego	Hoy Ya Me Voy	Dile al Amor	Sé Que Te Duele	Amor del Bueno	Colgando en tus Manos	Tu Recuerdo	Entra en mi Vida	Tan Solo Tú with Ana	Siempre en mi Mente	A Puro Dolor		Feeling Good		Cruz de Olvido	Experiencia Religiosa		Te Amo	Aire			
7	Fernando	Estos Celos with Alexis	Borracho de Amor	Robarte Un Beso	Pensar en Ti	Te Extraño, Te Olvido, Te Amo	No Se Murió el Amor	Corazón Partío		Amor Eterno	El Triste	Fuiste Tú with Fernando	Laura No Está		De Qué Manera Te Olvido	Dígale						
8	Isbo	Aléjate de Mí with Katheryn	Qué Precio Tiene el Cielo	En Ésta No	Despacito	Nunca Voy a Olvidarte	Mi Niña Bonita	El Día que me Quieras		No Tengo Dinero	A Mi Manera		Me Dedique a Perderte									
9	Marian	Hoy Ya Me Voy	Abrázame	Shabadabada	Mi Error, Mi Fantasia	El Eco de Tu Voz	El Sol No Regresa	Corre		Caray	No Pasa Nada											
10	Ana	Volverte a Amar with Silvia	Alma Gemela	Darte Un Beso	Estés en Donde Estés	Duele el Amor	Yo No Soy Esa Mujer	Algo Más	Tan Solo Tú with Diego	No Vale la Pena												
11	Adolfo	Fascinación with José	Ya Me Enteré	Intocable	Canta Corazón	La Camisa Negra	Lo Dejaría Todo															
12	Daniela	Tu Falta de Querer with Paola	Sin Ti No Puede Estar Mal	Hasta La Raíz	Equivocada	Mi Tierra																
13	Monse	Ahora Te Puedes Marchar with Paulina	Enamorada	Mi Persona Favorita	Mala Hierba																	
14	Mon	3 a.m. with Charly	Caraluna	Besos de Ceniza																		
15	Charly	3 a.m with Mon	Bella																			
16-18	José	Fascinación with Adolfo																				
16-18	Karen	Que Nadie Sepa Mi Sufrir with Dalia																				
16-18	Paulina	Ahora Te Puedes Marchar with Monse																				

=== Season 12 (2019–20) ===
La Academia
- Starring: Arturo López Gavito; Alexander Acha; Danna Paola; Horacio Villalobos
- No. of episodes: 16

Release
- Original network: Azteca Uno
- Original release: 10 November 2019 – 23 February 2020
- Prizes; 1st: MX$1,000,000; 2nd: MX$100,000; 3rd: MX$100,000

On 23 October 2019, TV Azteca held a special ceremony to reveal details about the upcoming season of its most successful show. Horacio Villalobos and Arturo López Gavito would seat again at the judges' table and they would be joined by Remmy Valenzuela (who was let go after the first concert), Alexander Acha and Danna Paola. For the first time, the reality show would have a prestigious artist who would become "the voice of experience" and work as a mentor for the contestants. This task would pertain to the Chilean singer and songwriter Beto Cuevas, who explained that it would take them out of their comfort zone. During the presentation, Adal Ramones and Cynthia Rodríguez also presented the principal of La Academia, which would again be Héctor Martínez, and the teaching staff would be Alan Benabib, Beto Castillo, Guille Gómez, Lula Ross, Jorge Romano, Raúl Carballeda, Rodrigo Cachero and Rosa Virgen. In addition, Chacho Gaytán would be in charge of the musical direction of the show. The finale was held on 23 February, in which the winner received a recording contract and MX$1,000,000.

Angie, Dalú, Carlos, Charly & Dennis reached the finale. Dalú was declared the twelfth winner of La Academia.

Place	Contestants	Age	City
01	Dalú Borunda	24	Culiacán, Sinaloa
02	Angie Flores	18	Tegucigalpa, Honduras
03	Carlos Torres	21	Guadalajara, Jalisco
04	Dennis Arana	21	Guatemala City, Guatemala
05	Charly Zúñiga	24	Matamoros, Tamaulipas
06	Maria Fernanda González	29	Mazatlán, Sinaloa
07	Susy Ortoño	22	Apatzingán, Michoacán
08	Francely Abreu	18	Mérida, Yucatán
09	Jonathan Meza	21	Hermosillo, Sonora
10	Gibran Gutiérrez	19	Guadalajara, Jalisco
11	Jorge Alejandro Flores	25	Tegucigalpa, Honduras
12	Effeta López	21	Guadalajara, Jalisco
13	Rosa Mary Mier	26	Puebla, Puebla
14	Jazmin & Stephanie Sotelo	19	Loreto, Zacatecas

Concerts
Rank	Contestant	11/10/19	11/17/19	11/24/19	12/01/19	12/08/19	12/15/19	12/22/19	12/29/19	01/05/20	01/12/20		01/19/20		01/26/20			02/02/20		02/09/20		02/16/20		02/23/20	
1	Dalú	Creo en Mi	En Peligro de Extinción with Carlos	Volver a Amar	El Listón de tu Pelo	Mírame	Algo Contigo	Mi Peor Error	Ahora Tú	El Sol No Regresa	Oye	Te Equivocaste vs Angie	Otro Amor Vendrá		Tiempos Mejores		Una Canción No Es Suficiente with Angie	I Will Always Love You		Abrázame	Ya Lo Se Que Tú Te Vas vs Charly	Bang Bang		Sola Otra Vez	Abrázame with Rocío Banquells
2	Angie	Es Ella Más Que Yo	Aquí Estoy Yo with Susy	Lo Busqué	Castillos	Eclipse Total del Amor	Tu Falta de Querer	Malo	Lloviendo Estrellas	Remolino	Cuando Baja La Marea	Te Equivocaste vs Dalú	Hasta Que Me Olvides	Regresa a Mí vs Ma. Fernanda	Vive	Fuiste Tú vs Dennis	Una Canción No Es Suficiente with Dalú	7 Rings		Yo Por Él	Ya Lo Pasado, Pasado vs Carlos	Sax	De Mi Enamórate vs Charly & Dennis	En Cambio No	Lo Busqué with Ana Bárbara
3	Carlos	Tatuajes	En Peligro de Extinción with Dalú	No	Me Muero	Secreto de Amor	Olvídame Tú	Hoy Tengo Ganas de Ti	Para Amarnos Más	Canción del Mariachi	El Aventurero	Y Todo Para Qué vs Charly	Mañana, Mañana		Dueño de Nada		El Triste with Dennis & Charly	Cielo Rojo		El Viajero	Ya Lo Pasado, Pasado vs Angie	A Mi Manera		La Bikina	El Pastor with Aida Cuevas
4	Dennis	Enloquéceme	La Bicicleta with Jaz & Stephy	Propuesta Indecente	Mi Viejo	Ahora Quién	Mi Mayor Anhelo	La Camisa Negra	Como Yo Te Amo	Abrázame Muy Fuerte	Cómo Te Atreves	Vivir Asi Es Morir de Amor vs Jona	¿Y Cómo es El?	La Incondicional vs Charly	Algo de Mi	Fuiste Tú vs Angie	El Triste with Carlos & Charly	Ángel		¿De Qué Me Sirve La Vida?	La Farsante vs Ma. Fernanda	Born This Way	De Mi Enamórate vs Angie & Charly	Si Me Dejas Ahora	¿De Qué Me Sirve La Vida? with Samo
5	Charly	Solo con Verte	Tan Solo Tú with Ma. Fernanda	Fíjate Que Si	Rayando el Sol	Usted Se Me Llevo la Vida	De los besos que te di	A través del Vaso	Por Mujeres Como Tú	Y Hubo Alguien	Ójala Que Te Mueras	Y Todo Para Qué vs Carlos	Aunque Ahora Estés Con El	La Incondicional vs Dennis	Tan Enamorados		El Triste with Carlos & Dennis	Ya Es Muy Tarde		Adiós Amor	Ya Lo Se Que Tú Te Vas vs Dalú	Vas a Llorar Por Mi	De Mi Enamórate vs Angie & Dennis	Mi Eterno Amor Secreto	A través del Vaso with Lupillo Rivera
6	Ma. Fernanda	Castillo Azul	Tan Solo Tú with Charly	Adelante Corazón	Yo Te Esperaba	Huele a Peligro	Simplemente Amigos	Basta Ya	Te Amo	Así Fué	Burbujas de Amor	Algo Más vs Francely	El Me Mintió	Regresa a Mí vs Angie	Simplemente Amigos			I Will Survive	Quererte a Ti vs Susy	Acaríciame	La Farsante vs Dennis				
7	Susy	Amores Extraños	Aquí Estoy Yo with Angie	No Me Pidas Perdón	Sin Él	Inocente Pobre Amiga	Ya Te Olvidé								Desde la Oscuridad			Invencible	Quererte a Ti vs Ma. Fernanda						
8	Francely	Como Hemos Cambiado	Estoy Enamorado with Gibran	Con Altura		Mis Ojos Lloran Por Ti	1, 2, 3	Te Extraño, Te Olvido, Te Amo	Muriendo Lento	Me Voy a Ir	Andar Conmigo	Algo Más vs Ma. Fernanda	Ojos Así		Acaríciame										
9	Jona	Recuérdame	Un Mundo Ideal with Rosa	Peligro	Bailando	Amante Bandido			Corazón en la Maleta	Te Amaré	Aléjate de Mi	Vivir Asi Es Morir de Amor vs Dennis													
10	Gibran	Reggaeton Lento	Estoy Enamorado with Francely	Como Quien Pierde Una Estrella	Fuego de Noche, Nieve de Día				Duele el Corazón	Calma															
11	Jorge	Escápate Conmigo	Tutu with Effeta	La Chica de Humo	Uno Entre Mil	Bachata Rosa	Provócame	Si No Te Hubieras Ido	Intocable																
12	Effeta	Cómo Mirarte	Tutu with Jorge	Que Nivel de Mujer	No Me Quiero Enamorar	Te Quise Olvidar	Yo Quisiera																		
13	Rosa Mary	Tú	Un Mundo Ideal with Jona	Quítame Ese Hombre																					
14	Jaz & Stephy	Nunca es Suficiente	La Bicicleta with Dennis																						

=== Season 13 (2022) ===
La Academia
- Starring: Arturo López Gavito; Lolita Cortés; Ana Bárbara; Horacio Villalobos
- No. of episodes: 19

Release
- Original network: Azteca Uno; Estrella TV (USA)
- Original release: 12 June – 14 August 2022
- Prizes; 1st: MX$1,000,000

La Academia commemorated its 20th anniversary with a new season in 2022. On 9 May 2022, it was announced that Lolita Cortés and Arturo López Gavito would once again share the judges' panel. The season would also have Horacio Villalobos and popular singer, Ana Bárbara critiquing the students' performance every Saturday and Sunday. As part of the 20 year celebration, First Generation's Yahir would serve as the main host with Vanessa Claudio as co-host, who would be replacing Adal Ramones and Cynthia Rodriguez. Alexander Acha would act as the principal of the new season, while Aleks Syntek would step in as their mentor.

Andres, Cesia, Nelson, Rubí & Mar reached the finale. Cesia was declared the thirteenth winner of La Academia.

Place	Contestants	Age	City
01	Cesia Saenz	23	Comayagua, Honduras
02	Andrés Seuv	25	Hermosillo, Sonora
03	Mar Rendón	19	Quito, Ecuador
04	Nelson Carreras	21	Guatemala City, Guatemala
05	Rubí Ibarra	21	San Luis Potosí, San Luis Potosí
06	Eduardo Ochoa	29	San Jose, California
07	Santiago Domínguez	22	Mexico City
08	Fernanda Herrera	21	Villahermosa, Tabasco
09	Zunio	27	Guayaquil, Ecuador
10	Isabela Ortega	19	Villahermosa, Tabasco
11	Jackie López	26	Culiacán, Sinaloa
12	Mariana Logue	27	Mexico City
13	Emilio de la Cruz	21	Aguascalientes, Aguascalientes
14	Alejandra Wiessner	28	Ciudad Obregón, Sonora
15	Esmeralda Azucena	24	Chilpancingo, Guerrero

Concerts
Rank	Contestant	06/12/22	06/18/22	06/19/22	06/25/22	06/26/22	07/02/22	07/03/22	07/09/22	07/10/22	07/16/22	07/17/22	07/23/22	07/24/22	07/30/22	07/31/22	08/06/22			08/07/22	08/13/22		08/14/22
1	Cesia	Llama Porfavor	Vive	El Me Mintió	Te Hubieras Ido Antes	Pero Me Acuerdo de Ti	A Quién Le Importa	Ese Hombre	Loca	La Negra Tiene Tumbao	Acá Entre Nos	Como Lo Hice Yo	Recuérdame with Andrés	Vivir Lo Nuestro	Llama Porfavor	Miénteme	Fuiste Tú with Nelson			Oye	Yo Viviré	Cosas del Amor with Erika (2G)	Por Amor
2	Andrés	Suave	Vive	Vente Pa'cá	Te Lo Pido Por Favor	Bella Señora	Corazón Partío	Salomé	Livin' La Vida Loca	Triste Canción de Amor	Fria Como El Viento	Ahora Quién	Recuérdame with Cesia	Y Cómo Es El?	Vente Pa'cá	Bailar Pegados	Llorar with Mar			Abrázame Muy Fuerte	Ayer	Ya No Vives en Mi with Myriam (1G)	Me Va a Extrañar
3	Mar	Inevitable	Bésame Mucho	Muriendo Lento	Tusa	Mala Hierba	La Fuerza del Corazón	Me Cuesta Tanto Olvidarte	Ciega, Sordomuda	Ahí Donde Me Ven	Persiana Americana	Amor Ordinario	Nuestro Juramento with Zunio	Sentirme Vivo	Ahí Donde Me Ven	La Cosa Más Bella	Llorar with Andrés	Laura No Está		Ángel	Amores Extraños	Amárrame with Erik (9G)	Ahora Tú
4	Nelson	Yo No Sé Mañana	Felices los 4	Todo de Ti	Échame la Culpa with Isabela	Volví a Nacer	Escándalo	No Podrás	Pégate	Te Amo	Darte Un Beso	Ropa Cara	Adrenalina with Rubí	A La Antigüita	No Podrás	Creo en Ti	Fuiste Tú with Cesia	Aquí Estoy Yo	Lo Que No Fue, No Será	Amiga Mía	Robarte Un Beso	Estoy Enamorado with Paola (11G)	Mientes
5	Rubí	Equivocada	Bésame Mucho	Las Mil y Una Noches	Tusa	La Misma Luna	Que Nadie Sepa Mi Sufrir	La Maldita Primavera	3 a.m. with Rubí	Basta Ya	Como Tu Mujer	Y Te Aprovechas	Adrenalina with Nelson	La Noche			Colgando En Tus Manos with Eduardo			Eres Para Mí	A Fuego Lento	La Pareja Ideal with Menny (7G)	Mi Error, Mi Fantasia
6	Eduardo	Que Te Ruegue Quien Te Quiera	Tú	Mi Viejo	Por Amarte	El Tóxico	Tan Solo Tú with Isabela				Mujeres Divinas	Bella	Como Quien Pierde Una Estrella with Santiago & Fernanda		Mi Viejo	A Puro Dolor	Colgando En Tus Manos with Rubí	Esta Tarde Vi Llover	El Amor de Su Vida	Hoy Tengo Ganas de Ti			
7	Santiago	Estos Celos	No Sé Tú	La Mitad	Te Lo Pido Por Favor	Hombre Normal	17 Años	Cuando Calienta el Sol	3 a.m. with Santiago	Despacito	Música Ligera	La Camisa Negra	Como Quien Pierde Una Estrella with Eduardo & Fernanda	Te Mando Flores	Estos Celos								
8	Fernanda	Paloma Negra	Como Pagarte	Me Gustas Mucho	Por Amarte	Volver, Volver	Cómo Te Voy a Olvidar	Acaríciame	Bandido	A Mi Manera	Propuesta Indecente	No Soy Una Señora	Como Quien Pierde Una Estrella with Santiago & Eduardo	Acaríciame									
9	Zunio	Tacones Rojos	Como Pagarte	Tan Enamorado	Te Hubieras Ido Antes						Mas Que Tu Amigo	Y Si Fuera Ella	Nuestro Juramento with Mar										
10	Isabela	Al Final	No Sé Tú	No Me Doy Por Vencido	Échame La Culpa with Nelson	Tanto	Tan Solo Tú with Eduardo	Procuro Olvidarte	Ojos Así		Culpable o No												
11	Jackie	Vivir Asi es Morir de Amor	Un Buen Perdedor	Mala Fama	Te Lo Pido Por Favor	Así Fué	Arrasando	La Nave del Olvido															
12	Mariana	Lo Que Tenías Conmigo	Felices los 4	1, 2, 3	Burbujas de Amor	Azúcar Amargo																	
13	Emilio	Mi Último Deseo	Un Buen Perdedor	En Peligro de Extinción	Burbujas de Amor																		
14	Alejandra	Señora	Tú	No Llega el Olvido																			
15	Esmeralda	Por Ti Volaré	Bésame Mucho																				

== Spin-off Generations ==
No.	Aired	Winner	Runner-up	Third place	Other Finalists	Main Judges				Presenter(s)	Principal
No.	Aired	Winner	Runner-up	Third place	Other Finalists	1	2	3	4	Presenter(s)	Principal
US	20 November 2005	Mariana	Gustavo	Nohelia	Afid & Yoshigei	Adrián; Pieragostino	María; Conchita; Alonso	Lolita; Cortés	Arturo; López; Gavito	Fernando del Solar	Beto; Castillo
US	26 February 2006	Mariana	Gustavo	Nohelia	Afid & Yoshigei	Adrián; Pieragostino	María; Conchita; Alonso	Lolita; Cortés	Arturo; López; Gavito	Fernando del Solar	Beto; Castillo
CA	26 May 2013	May	Kike	Liam	Elvira, Bryan, Alex, Luis, David & Diana	Guest; Judge	Raquel; Rivas		Pedro; Meléndez	Carlos Guerrero, Celina Chanta & Gustavo Vallecillo	Tavo; Bárcenas
CA	4 August 2013	May	Kike	Liam	Elvira, Bryan, Alex, Luis, David & Diana	Guest; Judge	Raquel; Rivas		Pedro; Meléndez	Carlos Guerrero, Celina Chanta & Gustavo Vallecillo	Tavo; Bárcenas
K1	31 August 2013	Eddy	Nahomy	Adamaris	Christopher, Ximena & Michelle	Alicia; Villarreal	Lolita; Cortés		Luis; Coronel	Ingrid; Coronado	Kiko; Campos
K1	14 December 2013	Eddy	Nahomy	Adamaris	Christopher, Ximena & Michelle	Alicia; Villarreal	Lolita; Cortés		Luis; Coronel	Ingrid; Coronado	Kiko; Campos
K2	30 August 2014	Karla	Sarah	Nicole & Alexis	Angélica & Sofía	Alicia; Villarreal	Lolita; Cortés		Víctor; García	Ingrid; Coronado	Kiko; Campos
K2	13 December 2014	Karla	Sarah	Nicole & Alexis	Angélica & Sofía	Alicia; Villarreal	Lolita; Cortés		Víctor; García	Ingrid; Coronado	Kiko; Campos

=== USA: Season 1 (2005–06) ===
La Academia
- No. of episodes: 14

Release
- Original release: 20 November 2005 – 26 February 2006

La Academia USA was the first musical reality show with only Hispanic and Latino contestants in the United States, launched by Azteca America in October 2005. The auditions were done nationwide and the first La Academia USA concert was on 20 November 2005.

After three months of competition La Academia USA came to an end, crowning Mariana Vargas as winner of the reality show. As the winner and runner-up, Mariana and Gustavo respectively received contracts with Warner Music for the release of an album.

Place	Contestants
01	Blanca Mariana Vargas Grajeda
02	Gustavo Alfonso Amezcua Fuentes
03	Nohelia María Sosa Guerrero
04	Afid Ferrer Ávalos
05	Yoshigei Cázares Silva
06	Jazmín Olivo Ceballos
07	Francisco Alvarado Rivera
08	Adán Castillo
09	Iván Quiñonez
10	Diana Galindo Martínez
11	Heloisa Alves
12	Catalina Naranjo
13	Michael Anthony Muenchow Rivera
14	Gabriel Juan Rodríguez Policastro
15	Alejandro Hernández López (El Chino)
16	Carlos Soto García
17	Bianca Filio Martínez
18	Fatimat Aihassan Villanueva

Concerts
Rank	Contestant	11/20/05	11/27/05	12/04/05	12/11/05	12/18/05	12/25/05	01/01/06	01/08/06	01/15/06	01/22/06	01/29/06		02/05/06		02/12/06		02/19/06			02/26/06	
1	Mariana	Viveme with Nohelia	México en la piel	Acariciame	Nunca voy a olvidarte	Devorame otra vez	Without you	Si tú no estás aquí	La trampa	Ay amor	Oye mi canto	Me asusta, pero me gusta	Odio amarte with Nohelia, Yoshigei, Jazmín & Diana	Quién eres tú	A quién le importa with Nohelia, Yoshigei & Jazmín	Paloma negra	Caraluna with Jazmín	Si nos dejan	Dame una señal with Frankie	Cheque en blanco with Yoshigei, Nohelia & Jazmín	Paloma negra	Mentira
2	Gustavo	Mi credo with Carlos	Mujeres divinas	Noviembre sin ti	Es mejor decir adiós	La copa de la vida	La cosa más bella	Aire	El triste	Baila morena	Pedro Navaja	La camisa negra	El baile del perrito with Afid, Frankie, Adán & Iván	Juliana	Lo que pasó, pasó with Afid, Frankie, Adán & Iván	La planta	Acá entre nos with Afid	Qué de raro tiene	Yo no fui with Afid	Muchacha triste with Afid & Frankie	Mujeres divinas	Al final
3	Nohelia	Viveme with Mariana	En el último lugar del mundo	Amar sin ser amada	Con los años que me quedan	Regresa a mí	Amanecí otra vez	Innocente pobre amiga	Eternamente bella	Te quedó grande la yegua	Es demasiado tarde	Como olvidar	Odio amarte with Mariana, Yoshigei, Jazmín & Diana	Rata de dos patas	A quién le importa with Mariana, Yoshigei & Jazmín	Aprenderé	Cosas del amor with Yoshigei	No hace falta	Entra en mi vida with Yoshigei & Jazmín	Cheque en blanco with Yoshigei, Jazmín & Mariana	Te quedó grande la yegua	Que ganas de no verte nunca más
4	Afid	Pasión with Diana	México lindo y querido	A chillar a otra parte	Amor eterno	Aún sigues siendo mía	Ave María	Bamboleo	Secreto de amor	Salome	La Bamba	Volveré	El baile del perrito with Gustavo, Frankie, Adán & Iván	Canta corazón	Lo que pasó, pasó with Gustavo, Frankie, Adán & Iván	Y todo para qué	Acá entre nos with Gustavo	La puerta negra	Yo no fui with Gustavo	Muchacha triste with Gustavo & Frankie	La Bamba	Cuándo yo quería ser grande
5	Yoshigei	Could I have this kiss forever? with Adán	Bésame mucho	Costumbres	Algo más	Falsas esperanzas	Cucurucucú, paloma	La differencia	Amor a la mexicana	Bidi, bidi, bombom	Llegar a ti	Listen to your heart	Odio amarte with Mariana, Nohelia, Jazmín & Diana	Cómo se cura una herida	A quién le importa with Mariana, Nohelia & Jazmín	Sin él	Cosas del amor with Nohelia	Mentiras	Entra en mi vida with Nohelia & Jazmín	Cheque en blanco with Jazmín, Nohelia & Mariana	Llegar a ti	I will always love you
6	Frankie	Rock around the clock with Alejandro	Visa por un sueño	El alma en pie	Para tu amor	A gritos de esperanza	María	Bulería	Mi dulce niña	Corazón Partío	Lloraré las penas	En mi viejo San Juan	El baile del perrito with Gustavo, Afid, Adán & Iván	Esta ausencia	Lo que pasó, pasó with Gustavo, Afid, Adán & Iván	Me va extrañar	Azul with Adán	Perdoname	Dame una señal with Mariana	Muchacha triste with Gustavo & Afid		
7	Jazmin	Tres gotas de agua bendita with Fatimat	Bandolero	Hacer el amor con otro	Piensa en mí	Ese hombre	Tú eres mi luz	A qué no le cuentas	Lluvia	Que le den candela	Basta ya	A mi manera	Odio amarte with Mariana, Nohelia, Yoshigei & Diana	Burbujas de amor	A quién le importa with Mariana, Nohelia & Yoshigei	Es ella más qué yo	Caraluna with Mariana	Ten cuidado con el corazón	Entra en mi vida with Nohelia & Yoshigei	Cheque en blanco with Yoshigei, Nohelia & Mariana		
8	Adán	Could I have this kiss forever? with Yoshigei	Have I told you lately that I love you	A puro dolor	No te preocupes por mí	Usted se me llevó la vida	I want it that away	Dímelo	Otro día más sin verte	Sirena	No me quiero enamorar	Mi bombón	El baile del perrito with Gustavo, Afid, Frankie & Iván	Eres mi verdad	Lo que pasó, pasó with Gustavo, Afid, Frankie & Iván	Baby, I love your way	Azul with Frankie					
9	Iván	Nobody wants to be lonely with Catalina	Valió la pena	Tocando fondo	Ángel	Lamento boliviano	No podrás	TBC	Ahora quién	Te amo	Princesa tibetana	Te buscaría	El baile del perrito with Gustavo, Afid, Frankie & Adán	Suave	Lo que pasó, pasó with Gustavo, Afid, Frankie & Adán							
10	Diana	Pasión with Afid	Quién cómo tú	Echame a mi la culpa	No se si es amor	Cuándo baja la marea	Vive y llora	Sola con mi soledad	Así fue	Cómo hemos cambiado	No me enseñaste	Muriendo lento	Odio amarte									
11	Heloisa	Nada fue un error with Gabriel	Hijo de la luna	Cuéntame	Mía	Tomalo suave	Candela	A cada paso que doy	Ave María	I love rock and roll	La chica de Ipanema											
12	Catalina	Nobody wants to be lonely with Iván	Hasta el fin del mundo	Killing me softly	No me queda más	Daría	Qué bello	Pero me acuerdo de ti	Did not show up	Ven conmigo												
13	Michael	Sólo quédate en silencio with Bianca	Que vida la mía	Héroe	Hoy tengo ganas de ti	Se te olvidó	Everything I do (I do it for you)	La Bomba	Me dedique a perderte													
14	Gabriel	Nada fue un error with Heloisa	Presumida	Mujeres	Mi primer millón	Color esperanza	Un buen perdedor	Yo quisiera														
15	Alejandro	Rock around the clock with Frankie	Torero	Al fin me arme de valor	Inspiración	Toda la vida																
16	Carlos	Mi credo with Gustavo	Cómo te voy a olvidar	Volverte a ver	Si no te hubieras ido																	
17	Bianca	Sólo quédate en silencio with Michael	Te aprovechas	Si señor es mi son																		
18	Fatimat	Tres gotas de agua bendita with Jazmín	You Had Me																			

=== C.A: Season 1 (2013) ===
La Academia
- No. of episodes: 11

Release
- Original release: 26 May – 4 August 2013

Place	Contestants	Country
01	May Velasquez Diaz	El Salvador
02	Kike Alvarado Paz	Honduras
03	Liam Rivera Euceda	Honduras
04	Elvira Del Carmen López	Guatemala
05	Bryan Calvo Alvarez	Costa Rica
06	Alex Lima	Guatemala
07	Luis Gabriel Guerra	Panamá
08	David Navarro Zuñiga	Costa Rica
09	Diana Villamonte	Panamá
10	Yuli Visoná Castillo	Costa Rica
11	Joan Alfaro Rodriguez	El Salvador
12	Bárbara Lavaire Cruz	Honduras
13	Edwin Josué Moreno	Guatemala
14	María Fernanda León	Costa Rica
15	Allan Amed Licona Rodriguez	Honduras
16	Henna Marcela Figueroa	El Salvador
17	Arnold Galtán	Guatemala
18	Leo Brooks Palma	Costa Rica
19	Gaby Escamilla	El Salvador
20	Liz Yes Tobar	Guatemala
21	Rox Saravia Vargas	Nicaragua
22	Adry Beatriz Portillo	El Salvador

Concerts
Rank	Contestant	05/26/13	06/02/13	06/09/13	06/16/13	06/23/13	06/30/13	07/07/13	07/14/13	07/21/13	07/28/13		08/04/13	
1	May	Muriendo Lento	La vida es bella	Addicted to you	Quién eres tú	Ese hombre	El amor coloca	No me queda más	Qué nadie sepa mi sufrir	Basta ya	Contigo en la distancia	Si supieras	Rabiosa	Ese hombre
2	Kike	Pegate un poco más	Quisiera saber	Baila, baila	Más que tu amigo	El alma al aire	Toda la vida	Eres mi sueño	Ya lo sé qué tú te vas	Llorarás	Yo no sé mañana	¿Por qué les mientes?	A mi manera	Ya lo sé que tú te vas
3	Liam	Nena	Si supieras	La quiero a morir	Limbo	No podrás	Inolvidable	No me compares	Zumba	Dígale	Torre de Babel	¿Por qué les mientes?	Me va a extrañar	Inolvidable
4	Elvira	Fuiste tú	Odio amarte	Eternamente bella	Te aviso, te anuncio	The only exception	Black velvet	Pero me acuerdo de ti	No	We found love	Mi tierra	La vida es bella	No soy el aire	We found love
5	Bryan	No me ames	Por qué le mientes	Chica de humo	Si tú supieras	La llave de mi corazón	Livin' la vida loca	Mi primer día sin ti	Por debajo de la mesa	Corazón espinado	Mentiras	Soy sólo un secreto	Persiana americana	La llave de mi corazón
6	Alex	Looking for paradise	El mojado	Es mejor así	Temblando	It's my life	La malagueña	Cielo	Otro día más sin verte	Antes	Hoy tengo ganas de ti	La vida es bella	Azul como el mar	La malagueña
7	Luis	Muriendo lento	Por qué le mientes	Que alguien me diga	Ojalá qué te mueras	Regresa a mi	Smooth	Si no le contesto	Que hay de malo	Valió la pena	El Cantante	Vivir lo nuestro	¿Dónde está la vida?	
8	David	Fuiste tú	El mojado	Las cosas pequeñas	Volví a nacer	Claridad	Qué hay de malo	Golpes en el corazón		¿Cómo fue?	Vuelve	Si supieras	Hace tiempo	
9	Diana	No me ames	Lady Marmalade	Girl on fire	La negra tiene tumbao	Con los años qué me quedan	I feel like a woman	Pa ti no estoy	Oye	Malo	En su lugar	Vivir lo nuestro	Falsas esperanzas	
10	Yuli	Corazón partido	Odio amarte	Complicated	Ni Freud ni tu mamá	Starships	Que bello	Me cuesta tanto olvidarte	De repente	¿Con quién se queda el perro?	En el 2000	Soy solo un secreto		
11	Joan	Te dejo en libertad	Quisiera saber	Ella	Amor prohibido	Mío	Te quedó grande la yegua	Lo que son las cosas	Bandolero	Cómo yo nadie te ha amado				
12	Bárbara	Looking for paradise	Lady Marmalade	Si tú no estás aquí	Hoy	Miénteme	Ojalá	Como tu mujer	Chica ye-ye	Que le dén candela				
13	Josué	Corazón partido	Nadie como tú	No me conoces aún	Mi credo	Shake your bom bom	El triste	24 horas						
14	Allan	Pegate un poco más	Soy sólo un secreto	Te veo venir	Cómo te extraño	Qué nivel de mujer	Mi dulce niña							
15	Mafer	Beautiful Liar	Nadie cómo tú	No te pido flores	Algo contigo	Candela	Piel canela							
16	Henna	Beautiful liar	El duelo	Qué será de ti	Cómo duele	Call me maybe								
17	Arnold	Vivir lo nuestro	El duelo	Suave	El aprendiz	Mi niña bonita								
18	Gaby	Te dejo en libertad	Si supieras	Para volver a amar	Lo haré por ti									
19	Leo	Si no te hubiera conocido	La vida es bella	Locked out of heaven	Pégate									
20	Liz	Si no te hubiera conocido	Lady Marmalade	Sola otra vez										
21	Rox	Nena	Soy sólo un secreto											
22	Adry	Vivir lo nuestro												

=== KIDS: Season 1 (2013) ===
La Academia
- No. of episodes: 16

Release
- Original release: 31 August – 21 December 2013
- Prizes; 1st: MX$500,000; 2nd: MX$250,000; 3rd: MX$100,000; Guest performers: Peter La Anguila, Alicia Villareal, Carlos Rivera, Lambda García

La Academia Kids was originally presented in 2010 at the Bicentenanial Generation finale with Tatiana as the host, and was titled as La Academia Infantil and set to be launched in early 2011. However, in February 2011, Tatiana announced on her twitcam that the show was officially cancelled due to audition and production issues, and therefore, it would no longer be produced. On 11 July 2013, it was confirmed that La Academia Kids was in production again. Ingrid Coronado returned as the host, joined by Mauricio Barcelata and Mariana Torres. Alicia Villarreal, Lolita Cortés and Luis Coronel served as the judges. On 31 August, the show aired a casting special, while the first live concert took place on 7 September, and the finale was held on 21 December, where the winner received MX$500,000.

Adamaris, Cristopher, Eddy, Michelle, Nahomy & Ximena reached the finale. Eddy Valenzuela was declared the first winner of La Academia Kids.

Place	Contestants	Age	City
01	Eddy Valenzuela	12	Chihuahua, Chihuahua
02	Nahomy Campas	12	Hermosillo, Sonora
03	Adamaris Madrid	10	Culiacán, Sinaloa
04	Cristopher Vega	08	Los Angeles, California
05	Ximena Ramos	07	Durango, Durango
06	Michelle Gómez	10	Guadalajara, Jalisco
07	Guillermo Romo	11	Toluca, State of Mexico
08	Melany García	10	Guatemala City, Guatemala
09	Esaú Juarez	06	Guadalajara, Jalisco
10	Japhet Jaquim	07	Puebla, Puebla
11	Viviann Baeza	14	Querétaro, Querétaro
12	Cristian Aguilar	13	Monterrey, Nuevo León
13	Lupillo Llamas	09	Tijuana, Baja California
14	Santiago Jiménez	12	Mexico City
15	Juan Ángel García	10	San Luis Potosí, San Luis Potosí
16	Corina Agosto	10	Guadalajara, Jalisco
17	Irany Martínez	09	Ensenada, Baja California
18	Daniela Armas	12	Morelia, Michoacán
19	Sebastián Urdiales	11	Mexico City
20	Leslie Alavez	11	Atizapán, State of Mexico

Concerts
Rank	Contestant	09/07/13	09/14/13	09/21/13	09/28/13	10/05/13	10/12/13	10/19/13	10/26/13	11/02/13	11/09/13	11/16/13	11/23/13	11/30/13	12/07/13	12/14/13		12/21/13		
1	Eddy	24 horas	Cómo quién pierde una estrella	Algo más	Déjame llorar	Granada	Hermoso cariño	Vivo por ella	Vuélveme a querer	A mi manera	Vivir mi vida	Me gusta todo de ti	Don't you worry child	Nessum Dorma	Azul	Volver a amar	Se fue with Nahomy	El Triste	El Viajero	Granada
2	Nahomy	I will always love you	My heart will go on	I have othing	Malagueña	Sola otra vez	¿Quién eres tú?	Try	Lo quiero a morir	Run to you	De qué manera te olvido	Halo	Tu peor error	Wrecking ball	Applause	Someone like you	Se fue with Eddy	Ahora tú	Si nos dejan	I will always love you
3	Adamaris	Oye	Inevitable	Goma de mascar	Espacio sidereal	Víveme	Me nace del corazón	Nosotros nunca volveremos a estar juntos	Eclipse total de amor	Amor eterno	Lo qué son las cosas	Sueños Rotos	Desafiando la gravedad	De dónde sacas eso	Qué será de ti	La de la mala suerte	Por besarte with Christopher	Tan enamorados	Tarde	
4	Christopher	Las chamaquitas	La mejor de todas	Serenata huasteca	Así es la vida	Dime qué me quieres	La cosa mas bella	La puerta negra	Volverte a ver	Procuro olvidarte	Live while we´re young	Peligro	TBC	Valió la pena	Te regalo flores	Por amarte así	Por besartewith Adamaris	Gritar		
5	Ximena	La bikina	Tristes recuerdos	Qué ganas de no verte nunca más	Ángel	Olvídame y pega la vuelta with Esaú	Colgando en tus manos with Esaú	Basta ya	Mudanzas	La llorona	El me mintió	Muriendo lento	La carcacha	No te pido flores	Ya te olvidé	Así no te amará jamás	Maldita primavera with Ceci (9G)	Me muero		
6	Michelle	Pero me acuerdo de ti	Y volveré	Aquí estoy yo	Heart attack	Te sigo amando	Te aprovechas	Cruz de olvido	Firework	Inolvidable	Entre tú y mil mares	Por ti volaré	I knew you were trouble	Girlfriend	Volver	Just give me a reason	Con el alma en pie with Yahir (1G)	Clarity		
7	Guillermo	Directo al corazón	Mi gran noche	Es mejor así	Corre	La chica de humo	Abrázame muy fuerte	Lloviendo estrellas	Sueña	El rey	Creo en ti	Palabra de honor	Todo cambió	Ángel	Ya es muy tarde					
8	Melany	If I ain't got you	Mírame	Odio amarte	Umbrella	El amor coloca	Ángel	No se vivir si no es contigo	Regresa a mi	Cómo la flor	Just like a pill	Se me olvidó otra vez	Roar	Como tu mujer						
9	Esaú	Ya lo pasado, pasado	Cielito lindo	Hakuna matata with Japhet	La chica del bikini azul	Olvídame y pega la vuelta with Ximena	Colgando en tus manos with Ximena	Yo no fui	Te quiero	Perdóname mi amor por ser tan guapo	Quién pompo	La bamba	Sergio el bailador							
10	Japhet	Color esperanza	Mujeres	Hakuna matata with Esaú	Cuándo seas grande	A puro dolor	Acábame de Matar	Corazón partío	Cielo	México lindo y querido	No podras	Querida								
11	Viviann	Calla	Sabes una cosa	Canto de la tierra	Since U been Gpgone	Caruso	The edge of glory	Va todo al ganador	Beautiful	Somebody to love	Adelante corazón									
12	Cristian	Kiss you	No me doy por vencido	Rolling in the deep	Somebody to love	Locked out of heaven	La quiero a morir	How am I supposed to live without you	Moves like jagger	Blue suede shoes										
13	Lupillo	Pero te vas arrepentir	Mi credo	Y llegaste tú	Nunca voy a olvidarte	La plaga	Cómo yo te amo	Cielo rojo	Y qué quede claro											
14	Santiago	Walking on sunshine	Tu mirada	Forget you	Man in the mirror	Pégate	Mientes	El sinaloense												
15	Juan Ángel	El aventurero	El mariachi	Un hombre normal	A Dios le pido	Y todo para qué	Cómo yo nadie te ha amado													
16	Corina	Set fire to the rain	Don't stop believing	Just the way you are	Hijo de la luna	Por ti														
17	Irany	Rascacielos	Estés en donde estés	La cigarra	Suerte															
18	Daniela	Llorar	Afortunadamente no eres tú	Te dejo en libertad																
19	Sebastián	No importa la distancia	Sueña																	
20	Leslie	La muerte del palomo																		

=== KIDS: Season 2 (2014) ===
La Academia
- No. of episodes: 16

Release
- Original release: 30 August – 13 December 2014
- Prizes; 1st: MX$500,000; 2nd: MX$250,000; 3rd: MX$100,000

Due to the high ratings, TV Azteca producer Roberto Romagnoli confirmed a second season of La Academia Kids. On 25 July 2014, it was confirmed that Ingrid Coronado would return as the host, joined by Mariana Torres and Carlos Arenas, while Alicia Villarreal, Lolita Cortés, and First Generation's second place, Víctor García served as the judges. The season premiered on 16 August with a two-week casting special episodes, the first live concert took place on 30 August.

Angélica, Alexis, Karla, Nicole, Sarah & Sofía reached the finale. Karla Herrarte was declared the second winner of La Academia Kids, making her the first foreigner to ever win a season of the show.

Place	Contestants	Age	City
01	Karla Herrarte	12	Amatitlán, Guatemala
02	Sarah Silva	11	Los Angeles, California
03	Nicole Gatti	09	Veracruz, Veracruz
03	Alexis Orozco	12	Tijuana, Baja California
04	Angélica Vargas	11	Los Angeles, California
05	Sofia Escobar	08	Cuautlancingo, Puebla
06	Giovanni Malvaez	08	Xochimilco, Mexico City
07	Yuawi López	06	Guadalajara, Jalisco
08	Anthon Morales	12	San Nicolás de Los Garza, Nuevo León
09	José Fernando Hernández	10	Ciudad Victoria, Tamaulipas
10	Jacob Ayala	11	Mazatlán, Sinaloa
11	Jesús Figueroa	12	Mixco, Guatemala
12	Lolita Mora	11	South El Monte, California
13	Valeria Amarillas	06	Culiacán, Sinaloa
14	Alison Rivera	08	Nacajuca, Tabasco
15	Pablo Reina	06	Saltillo, Coahuila
16	Ximena Magaña	13	Guadalajara, Jalisco
17	Samantha Castro	10	Veracruz, Veracruz
18	Alejandro Vargas	13	Toluca, State of Mexico
19	Santiago Escobedo	05	Mexicali, Baja California
20	Marco Lopez	12	Azcapotzalco, Mexico City

Concerts
Rank	Contestant	08/30/14	09/06/14	09/13/14	09/20/14	09/27/14	10/04/14	10/11/14	10/18/14	10/25/14	11/01/14	11/08/14	11/15/14	11/22/14	11/29/14	12/06/14		12/13/14			
01	Karla	Pero me acuerdo de ti	My heart will go on	Ciega sordomuda	Oh, mio babbino caro	Chandelier	Ahora tú	If I ain't got you/Tarde/Dance again	Sola otra vez	Total eclipse of the heart	Macarthur Park	Va todo al ganador	Adagio	Run to you/Cómo tu mujer/Clarity	Roar	Cómo yo nadie te ha amado	Domino with Melissa Barrera (9G)	Fighter	Basta ya	El Triste	Chandelier
02	Sarah	Ain't it fun	Heart attack	7 things	Rather be	Ángel	La bikina	I'm with you/Me gustas mucho/Get lucky	Dog days are over	Ho, hey	La gata bajo La lluvia	Cinco minutos	Sobreviviré	Halo/La muerte del palomo/Since U been gone	Nella Fantasia	Entre tú y mil mares		La La Land	Cucurrucucú, paloma	I will always love you	Cinco minutos
03	Nicole	I have nothing	Without you	Problem	Carusso	Malagueña salerosa	Unconditionally	Óye/Inolvidable/We found love	Canto de la tierra	Falsas esperanzas	Piece of my heart	Break free	Pienso en ti	Just give me a reason/Abrázame muy fuerte/Proud Mary	Sweet nothing	Love on top	When you believe with Ceci de la Cueva (9G)	I knew you were trouble	Acábame de matar	No me doy por vencido	No se vivir si no es contigo
03	Alexis	Y te vas	Amor eterno	Hermoso cariño	Dígale	Cómo quién pierde una estrella	Bruja hada	Si tú te vas/Me gusta todo de ti/No podrás	Vivo por ella	Volverte a ver	El día que me quieras	Man in the mirror	Cruz de olvido	Respira/Cómo te voy a olvidar/Ave María	La fuerza del corazón	Vivir mi vida	Sereto de amor with José Manuel Figueroa	Será que no me amas	Te hubieras ido antes	La nave del olvido	Por volverte a ver
04	Angélica	Me nace del corazón	Pie Jesu	El viajero	Really don't care	Birthday	¿Quién eres tú?	Open arms/La vida es un carnaval/Walking on sunshine	Sabes una cosa	Can't remember to forget you	Non, je ne regrette rien	Así no te amará jamás	Granada	Ángel/Qué bonita es mi tierra/Grace Kelly	Shake it off	Cuándo no es contigo	Contigo sí with Agustín (7G)	TBC	El sinaloense		
05	Sofía	Corazón bipolar	Manías	No te pido flores	Víveme	No importa la distancia	We are never getting back together	Desafiando la gravedad/La carcacha/Por tí	Mi amor, amor	Qué te quería	Cómo la flor	Volverte a amar	Suerte	En cambio no/Hasta mañana/Suerte	Recuerdos	Me muero	Allí estaré with Daniel Elbittar	Niño			
06	Giovanni	Mi Credo	Dime qué me quieres	Un hombre normal	A puro dolor	Déjame llorar	Mi gran noche	Palabra de honor/Serenata huasteca/Azul	Ya es muy tarde	Darte un beso	Cómo me duele	Yesterday	Shabadabada	Te vi venir/Por tu amor/Cada beso	Si no te hubieras ido	Te presumo	Yo quisiera ya ser el rey with Adamaris Madrid	Dime qué me quieres			
07	Yuawi	La diferencia/Acá entre nos	Ojalá qué te vaya bonito	La diferencia	Caray	El próximo viernes	Otra vez	Cómo to te amo/Volver, volver/Claridad	Let it be	Mátalas	Hiedra venenosa	El Noa, noa	Y qué quede claro	Te amo/Estos celos/Ahora te puedes marchar	Sergio el bailador						
08	Anthon	24 horas	What about love	All of me	Cosa más bella	Cuándo seas grande	Don't stop believing	How am I supposed to live without you/La puerta negra/Tú necesitas	Love me again	Hey, soul sister	El pastor	Sin tantita pena	La media vuelta	Tú decidiste dejarme/Échame a mi la culpa/You shook me all night long							
09	José Fernando	Y todo para qué	El aventurero	Por amarte así	Lloviendo estrellas	La mejor de todas	Pégate	Me dedique a perderte/Aire/Mi niña bonita	¿Quién será?	Toda la vida	Persiana americana	La quiero a morir									
10	Jacob	El rey	Nada valgo sin tu amor	Esclavo de tus besos	Peligro	When a man loves a woman	Antes	Apologize/Mujer de piedra/Provócame	New York, New York	Pero te vas arrepentir	Don't stop me now	Abandoned the competition									
11	Jesús	Just the way you are	Gritar	Volver a amar	Best day of my life	Corazón Partío	Y llegaste tú	Mientes/Qúe no quede huella/One way or another	Iris	When I was your man	All my loving										
12	Lolita	Tu peor error	Girlfriend	Call me maybe	Try	Inevitable	¿A quién le importa?	Unbreak my heart/Bandido/Boom Clap	Sólo se vive una vez	A prueba de ti											
13	Valeria	Tristes recuerdos	Espacio didereal	De qué manera Te olvido	El chico del apartamento 512	Goma de mascar	Con la misma piedra	Bella y bestia son/Déjame vivir/Me voy													
14	Alison	Libre soy	Te quedó grande la yegua	Adelante corazón	Lo qué son las cosas	Y volveré	¿Con quién se queda el perro?	Me olvidarás/Te arovechas/Bella traición													
15	Pablo	Vuélveme a querer	Directo al corazón	La de la mochila azul	El mariachi	La chica del bikini azul	Marta tiene un marcapasos														
16	Ximena	Ya te olvidé	Slow down	Burn	Rolling in the deep	El amor coloca															
17	Samantha	Rascacielos	De dónde sacas eso	El último adiós	Algo más																
18	Alejandro	Happy	Tu mirada	Humanos a Marte																	
19	Santiago	Ya lo pasado, pasado	La plaga																		
20	Marco	Volví a nacer																			

== Notable careers ==
La Academia has been the most important reality show of Azteca, but not all of the contestants have transcended to a successful career. There are some examples of former La Academia contestants, that have been constantly on the public eye:

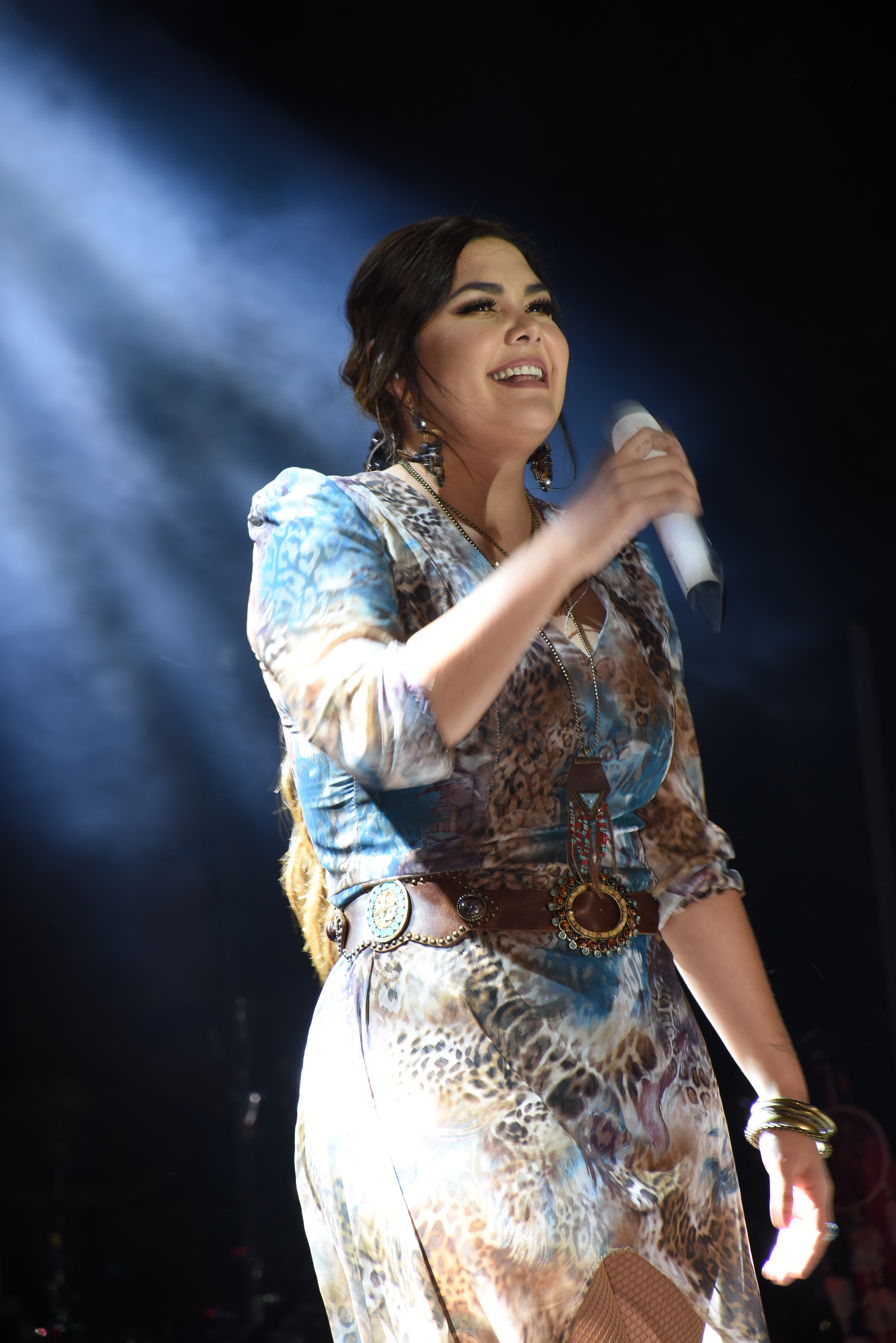
Yuridia

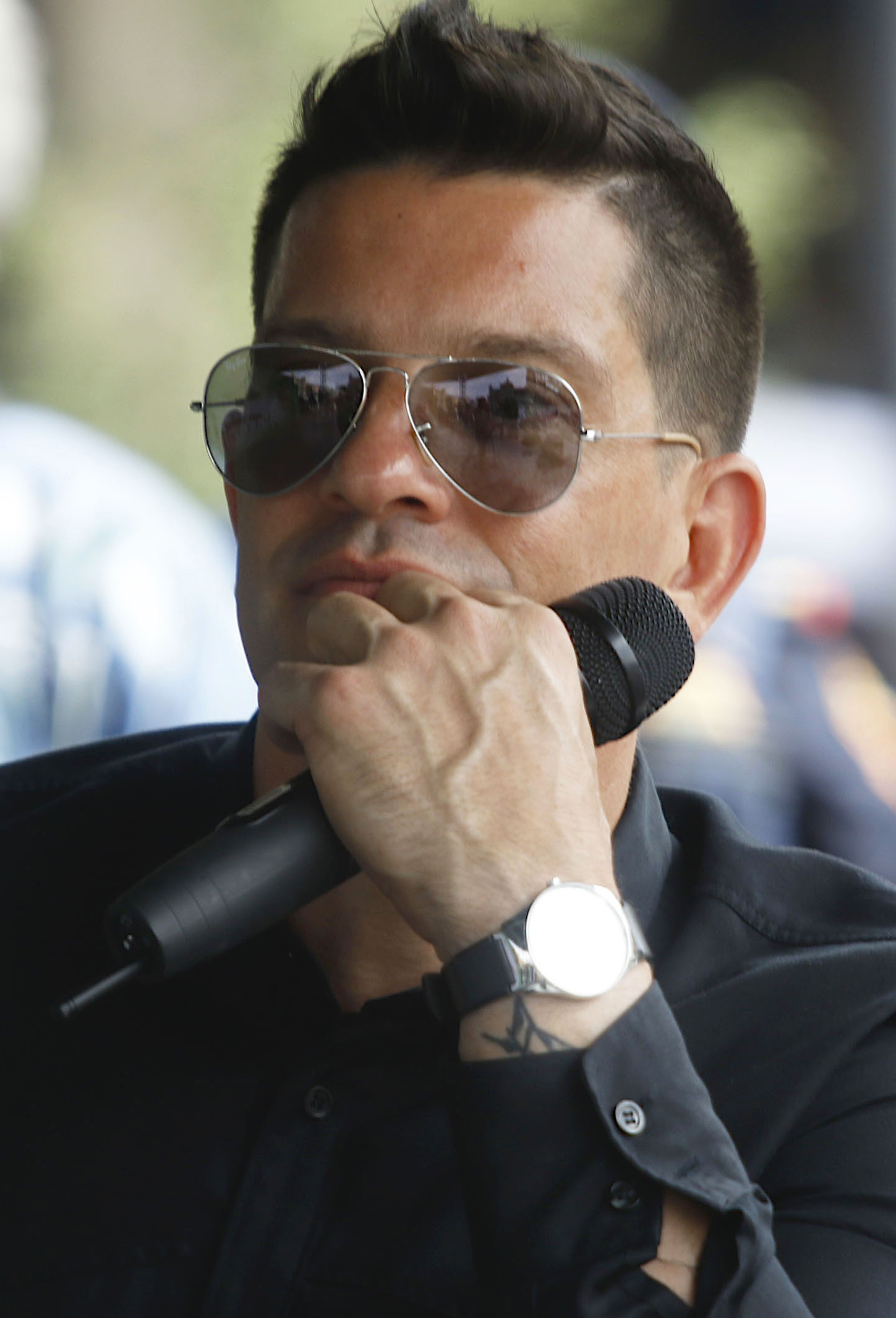
Yahir

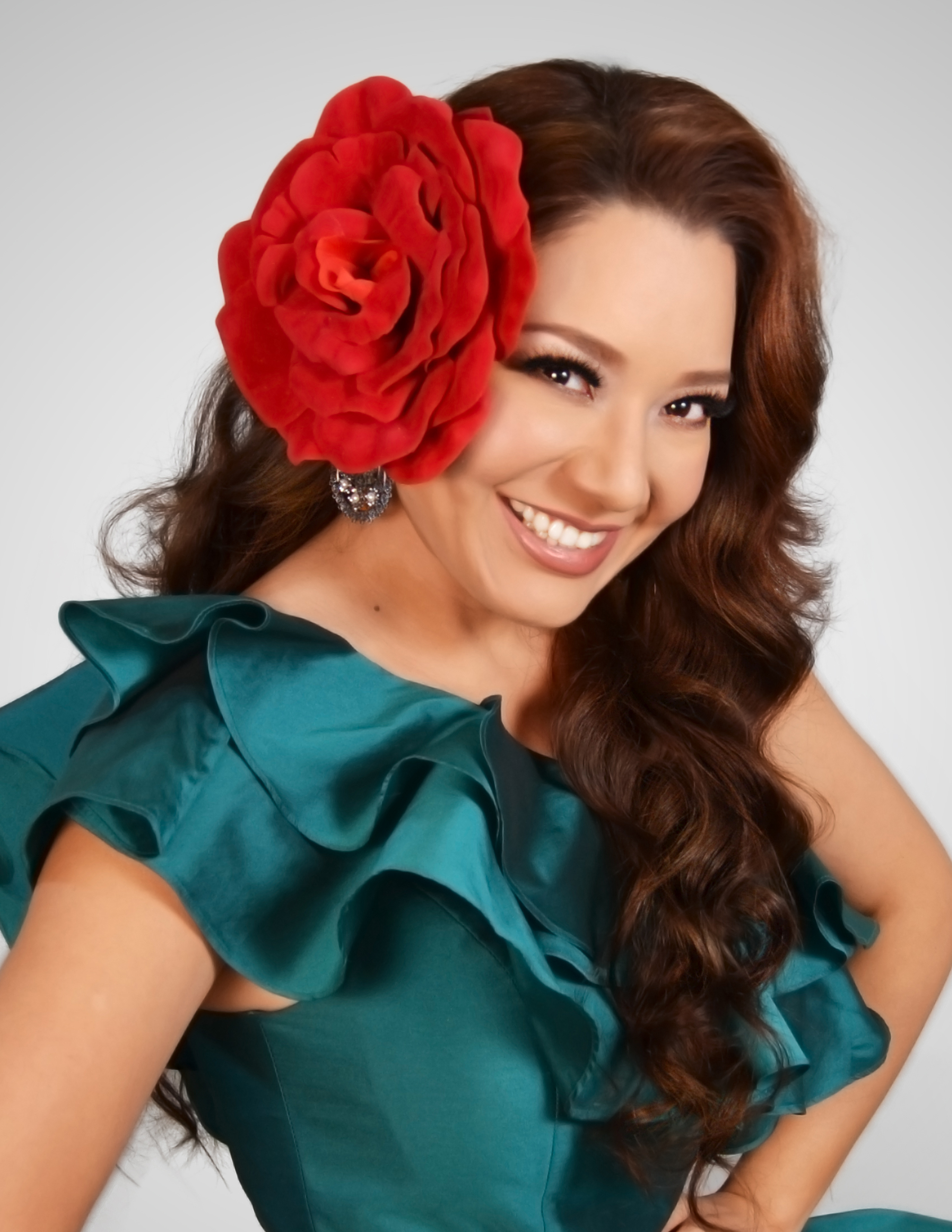
Nadia

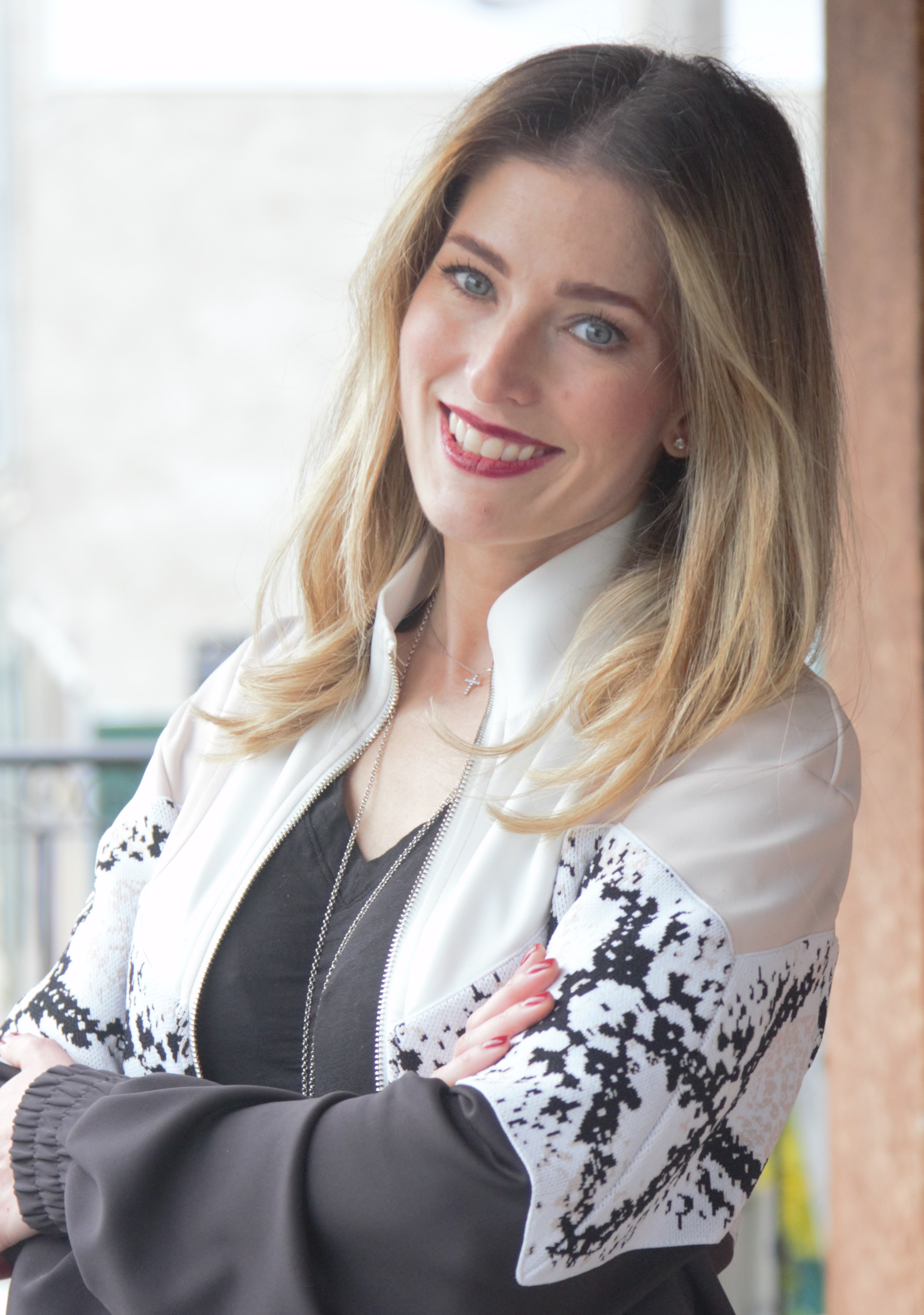
María Inés

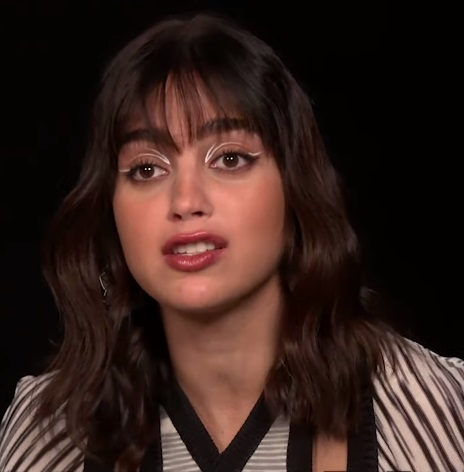
Melissa Barrera

1. Carlos Rivera, was the winner of The Third Generation, and decided to switch from a singing career to musical theater. He has done five plays, one of them being The Lion King Musical in Spain which got him international recognition. Since 2015, he joined TV Azteca's rival network, Televisa. He plays in El hotel de los secretos ("The Hotel of Secrets"), a Mexican soap-opera based the Spanish TV series Gran Hotel. In 2018, he became one of the 4 coaches of the Mexican version of The Voice's 7th season, produced by Televisa. His latest album Guerra has been a worldwide success, topping the charts all around the world. Rivera has collaborated with artists including the late Juan Gabriel, Thalía, José José, Pandora, Reyli Barba, Ana Torroja, Marta Sánchez, Franco De Vita, Ana Carolina and Daniel Boaventura, Paulo Gonzo, Abel Pintos, and India Martínez.
2. Yuridia, earned the second place of The Fourth Generation, and has recorded 7 albums including a Primera Fila: Desierto, they have managed to sell 3.5 million copies in Latin America and have received Gold, Platinum and even Diamond certifications.
3. Melissa Barrera, earned the eighteenth place of The 2011 Generation. From 2012 to 2015, she starred in four telenovelas produced by TV Azteca. In 2018, She starred as Lyn Hernandez on the Starz show, Vida. She was Vanessa in the 2020 film adaptation of Lin-Manuel Miranda's Tony Award-winning musical In The Heights, and is currently the lead of the Scream Franchise reboot films.
4. Yahir was part of The First Generation of this reality, and so far he has been one of the contestants with the most achievements, he has starred in soap-operas and recorded albums which garnered different recognitions.
5. María Inés Guerra, released only one album after her participation in La Academia. Instead, she kept going as an acknowledged host of important television shows in Azteca, furthermore she was the main antagonist of the 2003 soap opera Enamórate and hosted shows for other networks like Glitz, E! Entertainment Television and Disney Channel.
6. Nadia was the fifth place of The First Generation, and her 2003 album received Gold and Platinum recognitions, as well as having her duet with Yahir, Contigo Sí, on the top charts for 24 weeks. She has recorded several albums in different genres, and one of them earned a Grammy nomination, in addition to 3 Gold and 1 Platinum certifications.

The following table lists the top 10 best selling albums according to AMPROFON.

Rank	Album	Artist	Certifications	Season
1	La Voz de un Ángel	Yuridia		4
2	Para Mí	Yuridia		4
3-4	Habla El Corazón	Yuridia		4
3-4	Yahir	Yahir		1
5	No Te Apartes de Mí	Yahir		1
6-10	Mi Historia en La Academia	Myriam		1
6-10	Victor García	Victor García		1
6-10	Nadia	Nadia		1
6-10	Entre Mariposas	Yuridia		4
6-10	Yo Creo	Carlos Rivera		3
As of 2020
Source: AMPROFON

== Tours ==
Tours
Season	Tour Name	Date	Place	Performers
1	Tour 2002–2003		Auditorio Nacional, Mexico DF; Monterrey, N.L. Veracruz; Oaxaca; Querétaro; Leon, Guanajuato, Guadalajara, Jalisco; Pachuca, Hidalgo; San Luis Potosí; Morelia, Michoacan; Guatemala City, Guatemala; Aguascalientes; Hermosillo, Sonora; Mexicali, B.C. Tijuana, B.C.	Myriam; Victor; Miguel Angel; Yahir; Nadia; Toñita; Raul; Estrella; Laura; Ma. Ines; Jose Antonio; Wendolee; Alejandro; Hector
1	First Generation	24 August 2017	Auditorio Nacional, Mexico DF	Myriam; Victor; Miguel Angel; Toñita; Raul; Estrella; Laura; Ma. Ines; Jose Antonio; Wendolee; Alejandro; Hector
4	Tour 2005	16 July 2005; 23 July 2005; 24 July 2005; 28 July 2005; 29 July 2005; 30 July 2005; 31 July 2005; 27 August 2005; 28 August 2005; 7 September 2005; 8 September 2005; 9 September 2005; 10 September 2005; 11 September 2005; 23 September 2005; 24 September 2005; 29 September 2005; 1 October 2005; 7 October 2005; 8 October 2005; 9 October 2005	Palacio de los Deportes, Mexico DF; San Luis Potosí; Leon, Guanajuato; Querétaro; Aguascalientes; Guadalajara; Colima; Las Vegas, USA; Dallas, USA; Hermosillo, Sonora; Los Angeles, USA; Fresno, USA; Sacramento, USA; Monterrey-Salinas, USA; San Jose, USA; Boise Idaho, USA; Houston, Texas; McAllen, Texas; Phoenix, Arizona; Yuma, Arizona; Tucson, Arizona	Erasmo; Yurdia; Adrian; Cynthia; Edgar; Sylvia; Jose Luis; Johanna; Marco; Paula; Abyade; Mario; Jolette
7	La Nueva Academia Tour	21 May 2010	Auditorio Nacional, Mexico DF	Giovanna; Sebastian; Napoleon; Agustin; Menny; Oscar; Fabiola Jaramillo
9	La Gira que Gira	28 January 2012; 29 January 2012; 18 February 2012	Teatro Blanquita, Mexico DF; Teatro Blanquita, Mexico DF; Jalisco	Erick; Pablo; Carmen; Gil; Ronald; Gustavo; Ceci; Yanilen; Hancer; Tadeo

== Spin-offs ==
Show	Seasons	Concerts	Season premiere	Season finale
1st Desafío de Estrellas	1-2	15	6 April 2003	13 July 2003
Homenaje A...	1-2	11	20 July 2003	28 September 2003
2nd Desafío de Estrellas	1-4	22	8 January 2006	25 June 2006
El Gran Desafío de Estrellas	1-6	14	19 April 2009	26 July 2009
Segunda Opportunidad	1-7 + USA	11	21 March 2010	6 June 2010

=== Desafio De Estrellas (2003, 2006, 2009) ===
Desafío de Estrellas is a Mexican musical show produced and distributed by Azteca, the second most important network in the country. The format of the Desafío is similar to American Idol with contestants eliminated every week and a grand finale with the top contestants competing to win the first place prize. Azteca has, until 2006, produced two versions of the program, one in 2003 and the other in 2006.

- The 2003 version consisted only of former contestants of La Academia, another Azteca-produced show which had already garnished two seasons and, in the process, taken away rating from Televisa, the prime network of the country.
- The 2006 version, on the other hand, consisted of both former contestants of La Academia (all four seasons), as well as other artists produced by Azteca in the middle and late 90s.
- Later in 2009 a third season took place with former contestants of the six seasons of la academia.

=== Homenaje a...(2003) ===
Tribute to... placed season 1 and 2 contestants against each other each Sunday to compete for MX$100,000.

=== Segunda Oportunidad (2010) ===
Second Chance premiered on 21 March 2010. This show featured former contestants from seasons 1 to 7 who competed for a second chance at the competition and the music industry. The show featured 53 contestants from the 7 generations of "La Academia" and "La Academia USA". On 4 March, 50 contestants were announced, the other two will be chosen by voters on the internet. On 10 March, they announced the composition of 13 teams of four members each.

== International versions ==
International Version
Region	Local name	Channel	Winner	Main Presenters
Central America	La Academia Centroamérica	Azteca Guatemala	Season 1, 2013: May Velasquez	Carlos Guerrero (season 1); Celina Chanta (season 1); Gustavo Vallecillo (season 1)
Greece	House of Fame	Skai TV	Season 1, 2021: Stefanos Pitsiniagas	Eleni Foureira
Indonesia	Akademi Fantasi Indosiar	Indosiar	Season 1, 2003: Veri Affandi; Season 2, 2004: Theodora Meilani Setyawati; Season 3, 2004: Putu Sutha Natawijaya; Season 4, 2005: Ade Alfonso; Season 5, 2006: Tri Widi Nugroho; Season 6, 2013: Stefanny Patilaya	Adi Nugroho (Season 1 - Season 6); Najib Ali (Season 4); Bianca Liza(Season 6)
Indonesia	AFI Junior	Indosiar	Season 1, 2004: Samuel Dharmawan; Season 2, 2004-2005: Deasy; Season 3, 2005: Adi; Season 4, 2008: Teuku Ryzki Muhammad	Adi Nugroho (Season 1 - Season 6); Najib Ali (Season 4); Bianca Liza(Season 6)
Indonesia	La Academia Junior Indonesia	SCTV	Season 1, 2014: Kirana Anandita; Season 2, 2015: Ruri	Adi Nugroho (Season 1 - Season 6); Najib Ali (Season 4); Bianca Liza(Season 6)
Malaysia	Akademi Fantasia	Astro Ria	Season 1, 2003: Vincent Chong Ying-Cern; Season 2, 2004: Ahmad Zahid Baharuddin; Season 3, 2005: Asmawi Ani; Season 4, 2006: Mohammad Faizal Ramly; Season 5, 2007: Norsyarmilla Jirin; Season 6, 2008: Stracie Angie Anam; Season 7, 2009: Mohd Hafiz Mohd Suip; Season 8, 2010: Ahmad Shahir Zawawi; Season 9, 2011: Hazama Ahmad Azmi; Season 10, 2013: Faizul Sany; Season 11, 2014: Firman Bansir; Season 12, 2015: Sufi Rashid; Season 13, 2016: Amir Masdi; Megastar 2017: Idayu	Aznil Nawawi (Season 1-Season 5, season 9 & Megastar); Jimmy Shanley (season 8); Sarimah Ibrahim (season 6-season 8); AC Mizal (season 6-season 7); Seelan Paul(season 1); Zizan Razak (New Version, season 10 AF 2013-2016)
Paraguay	La Academia	Telefuturo	Season 1, 2013: Marilina Bogado	Dani Da Rosa (season 1)
Singapore	Sunsilk Academy Fantasia	StarHub TV	Season 1, 2012: Hui Xian	Louis Wu & Ophelia Su Bei Ru (season 1)
Thailand	True Academy Fantasia	True Visions	Season 1, 2004: Vit, Pacharapol Jantieng; Season 2, 2005:Aof, Supanat Chalermchaichareonkij; Season 3, 2006: Tui, Kiatkamol Lata; Season 4, 2007: Nat, Nat Sakdatorn; Season 5, 2008: Natthew, Nat Thewphaingam; Season 6, 2009: Zani, Nipaporn Thitithanakarn; Season 7, 2010: Por, Aunnop Tongborrisut; Season 8, 2011: Ton, Thanasit Chaturapush; Season 9, 2012: Ice, Pornpassorn Chaianannithi; Season 10, 2013: Tungbeer, Phurivach Teerachad; Season 11, 2014: Aim, Sathida Pinsinchai; Season 12, 2015: Max, Apisorn Sukawatnasai; Season 13, 2026: Jayjay, Chanita Baisamut	Settha Sirachaya (Seasons 1-12) Sanya Kunakorn (Season 13-present)
United States	La Academia USA	Azteca América	Season 1, 2005-2006: Mariana Vargas	Alan Tacher (season 1); Fernando del Solar (season 1)

== See also ==
- La academia 5.
- La academia USA.
- Akademi Fantasia.
- Academy Fantasia.
- Akademi Fantasi Indosiar.
- Desafio de Estrellas.
