= Ana María Alvarado =

Mexican journalist (born 1968)

- Born: Ana María Alvarado; November 28, 1968; Mexico City, Mexico
- Occupation(s): Journalist and Television Personality

Ana María Alvarado (born November 28, 1968, in Mexico City) is a Mexican journalist.

== Education ==
Alvarado studied Information Science and Technology at Nuevo Mundo University [ES].

== Career ==
Alvarado is an entertainment journalist who began her career at Grupo Radio Formula and ended up working for 32 years there as a journalist on the famous program "Todo para la mujer" together with Maxine Woodside.

From 2000 until 2005 she worked on the TV show Cada mañana. Later, she worked with Ingrid Coronado and Fernando del Solar on the Venga la alegría morning show until she was fired in 2012. She has participated in other shows including "Talk Show del padre Alberto", "Sale el Sol" and "Despierta América". She also writes a column in the Mexican newspaper, 24 horas -El Diario that is called, "El precio de la fama". Since 2017, she has been the host of "Sale el sol" for "Imagen Television" TV channel 103 in Mexico.

Alvarado was involved in public feuds with television presenter and actress, Yolanda Andrade in 2019 and television presenter, Daniel Bisogno, in 2020 after taking a polygraph test on-air She claimed that Bisogno had told her to die and called her a scorpion. She later feuded with her co-host Gustavo Adolfo Infante in the tv program Sale el Sol in 2022.

She was fired by her co-host Maxine Woodside on "Todo para la mujer" in an unusual situation in February 2023. She was invited back but chose not to return. Alvarado later said she would take her former co-host, Maxine Woodside, to court over the situation.

== Personal life ==
She was diagnosed with a brain tumour in 2020 and announced it publicly via YouTube the same year.
