= María Inés Guerra =

Mexican television host and singer (born 1983)

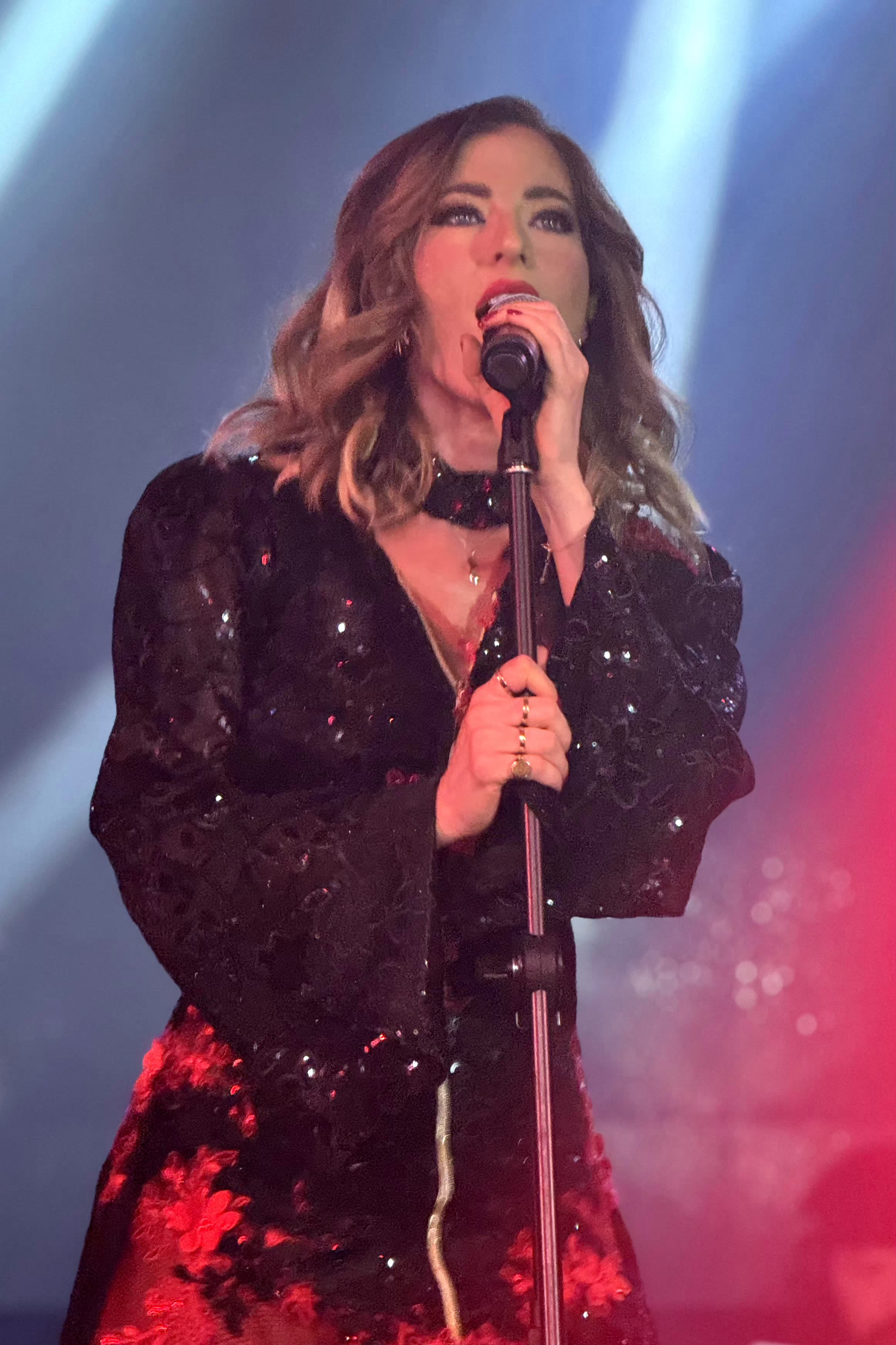
- Guerra in 2026
- Born: María Inés Guerra Nuñez; July 1, 1983 (age 42); Guadalajara, Jalisco, Mexico
- Occupations: Singer; television show host; model; actress; businesswoman
- Years active: 2002–present
- Spouse: Gustavo Gúzman Favela (m. 2013; div. 2019)
- Children: 3
- Musical career
- Genres: Pop; Latin pop
- Instruments: Vocals; piano
- Label: Sony BMG

Signature
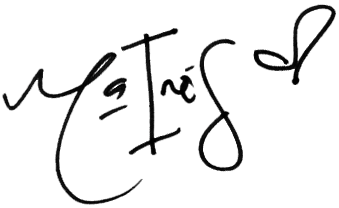

María Inés Guerra Núñez (born July 1, 1983) is a Mexican TV hostess and singer. She is currently a member of the group Reinas de Corazones, returning to her role as a singer.

== Early life and career ==
The daughter of Oscar Guerra and Laura Núñez, María Inés has two siblings, which were named after their parents. She has a twin brother, Oscar. As a child, she became interested in having a career in the world of entertainment, particularly in acting and singing. She participated in several plays, of which the Mexican version of CATS, is most important. María Inés has not set aside education because of this, however, and completed high school in the late '90s. For college, she attended the Monterrey Institute of Technology and Higher Education (in Spanish: Instituto Tecnológico y de Estudios Superiores de Monterrey, ITESM), one of the most prestigious and renowned colleges in Mexico and Latin America, where she majored in architecture.

== La Academia ==
In 2002, María Inés was selected among thousands of singers throughout Mexico to participate in La Academia, a national talent search similar to American Idol. Throughout the competition, she received both good and bad critics, her best performance being Hijo de la Luna, by Spanish group Mecano. María Inés served as a particular case in the competition, as she was eliminated twice. She was eliminated the fifth week of the competition, and was awarded the 13th place prize. María Inés was then brought back two weeks later during a special concert in which three former contestants were to come back to the show. Five weeks later, she was once again eliminated. A second concert for former contestants to come back was announced. In this concert, she interpreted "No Llores por mí, Argentina", the Spanish version of Madonna's "Don't Cry for Me, Argentina", and received excellent critics from the four judges. Controversy arose after María Inés was not selected to re-enter the reality, even though an internet poll in La Academia's official website showed her as the favorite to do so. After 13 weeks of competition, she received the 10th place in the reality. Within the show, she began a relationship with a fellow contestant, Raúl Sandoval. In La Academia Maria Ines interpreted:

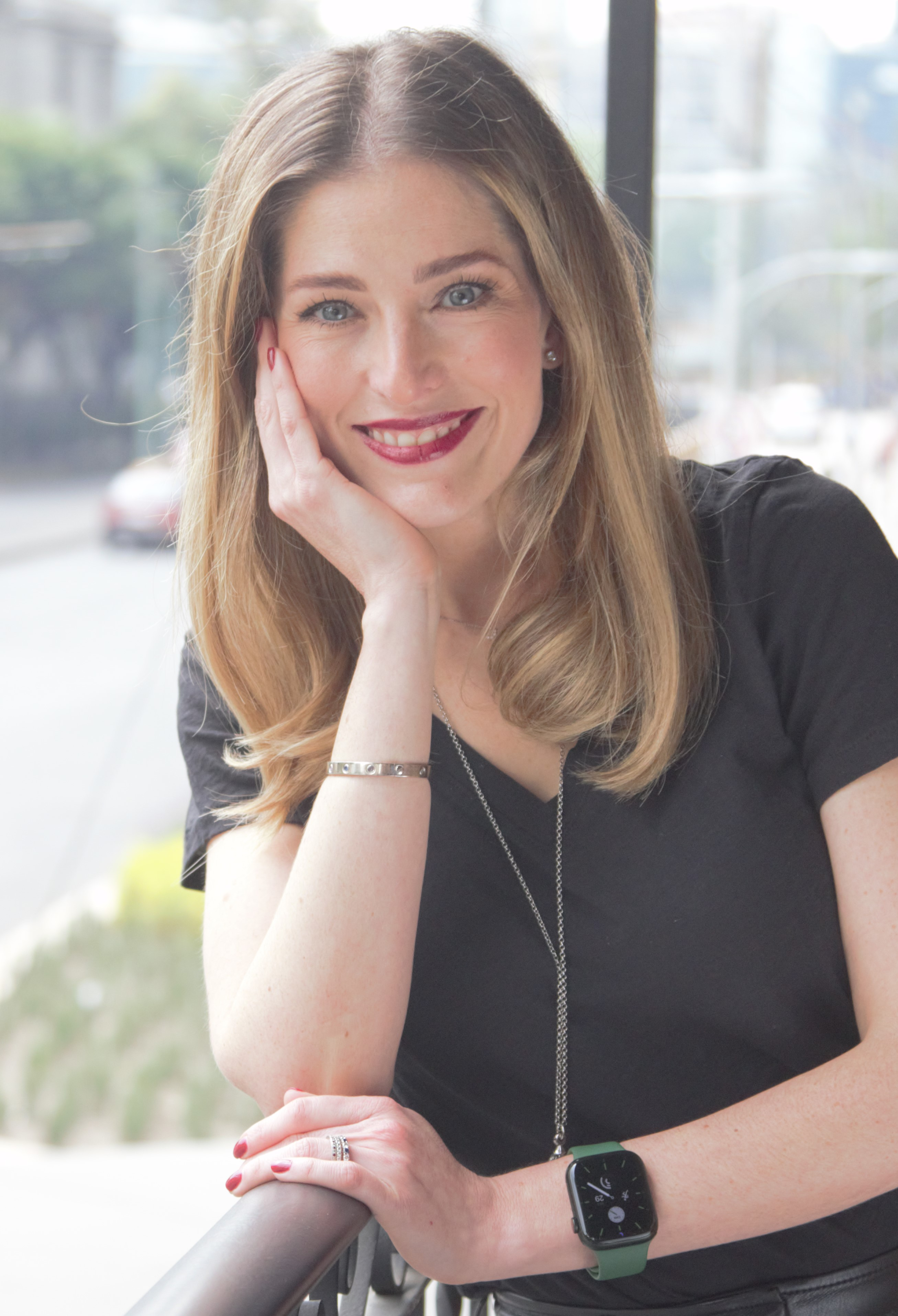
María Inés Guerra

| Concert | Song | | |
| Concert | Title | Artist | Results |
|---|---|---|---|
| 1 | Me Nace del Corazón With Jose Antonio | Juan Gabriel | SAFE |
| 2 | Así es la Vida With Hector & Yahir | Elefante | SAFE |
| 3 | Hijo de la Luna | Mecano | SAFE |
| 4 | I Want It That Way With Jose Antonio | Backstreet Boys | SAFE |
| 5 | Soledad | La Oreja de Van Gogh | SAFE |
| 6 | Yo No Soy Esa Mujer | Paulina Rubio | ELIMINATED |
| 10 (Expelled Students Concert) | Se Fué | Laura Pausini | RETURN |
| 11 | Te Quiero | Nacha Guevara | SAFE |
| 12 | Ay Amor | Flans | SAFE |
| 13 | Rueda Mi Mente | Sasha Sokol | SAFE |
| 14 | Cuéntame | Lucero | ELIMINATED |
| 15 (2nd. Expelled Students Concert) | No Llores por mi Argentina | Madonna | ELIMINATED |

== Desafío de Estrellas & Homenaje a... ==
After La Academia, Maria Ines participated in several other projects for TV Azteca. She first appeared in the Desafio de Estrellas, a competition between the 32 participants of the first and second generations of La Academia. In the fourth concert, and after becoming one of the 16 finalists, Maria Ines was eliminated and received the 16th place of the competition, ousting 16 other participants from both generations. In the Desafio Maria Ines interpreted:

| Concert | Song | | |
| Concert | Title | Artist | Results |
|---|---|---|---|
| 1 | Para no verte mas With Estrella, Gisela & Ana Lucia | La Mosca Tse-Tse | SAFE |
| 2 | Soledad With Alejandra | La Oreja de Van Gogh | SAFE |
| 3 | La Vida Que Va With Ana Lucia | Kabah | SAFE |
| 4 | El 7 de Septiembre | Mecano | ELIMINATED |

Maria Ines then participated in several concerts of the show Homenaje a..., which had the same format as La Academia, with contestants from that same show. A prize money was given in every show to the best singer but Maria Ines never received this prize, even though she appeared as one of the top 5 singers in all of the four concerts she participated in. Throughout the series of concerts Maria Ines interpreted famous songs from artists such as Rocío Dúrcal and Juan Gabriel, it was, however, "Me gustas tal y como eres", from Luis Miguel and Sheena Easton, in a duet with former boyfriend Raul, which is considered her best interpretation. The songs she interpreted in the Homenaje include:

- "No Lastimes mas" -- (Rocío Dúrcal)
- "Te amare" -- (Miguel Bosé)
- "Llueve sobre mojado" With Adrian -- (Camilo Sesto)
- "Asereje" -- (Las Ketchup)
- "Me Gustas Tal Como Eres" With Raúl Sandoval -- (Luis Miguel and Sheena Easton)

== Discography ==
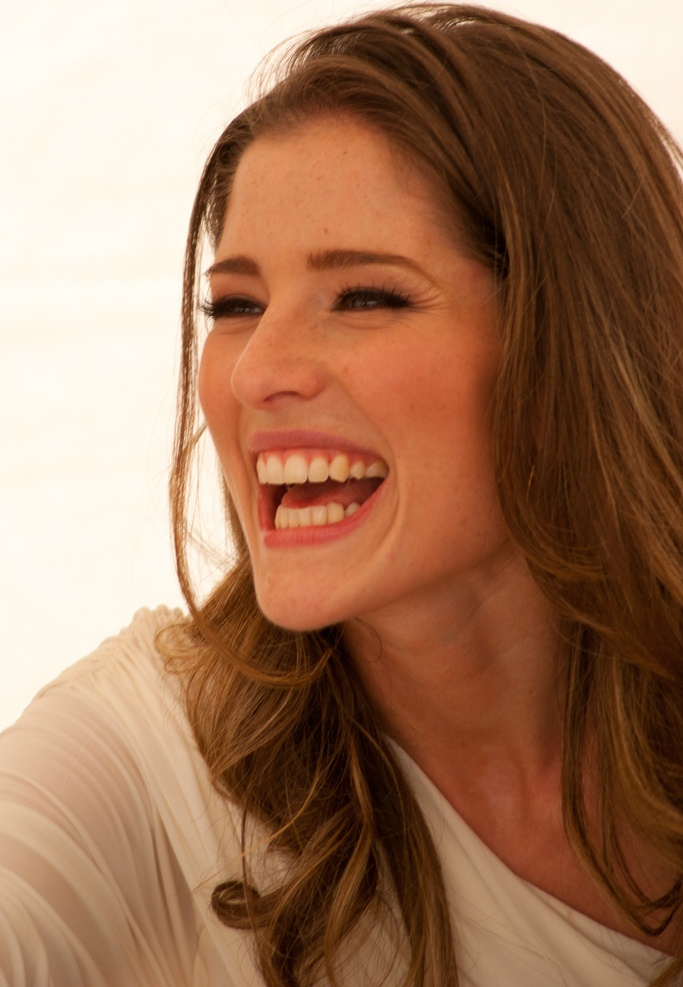
María Inés Guerra in January 2011

=== La Academia ===
La Academia, and all its spinoffs released up to 25 albums, in which María Inés participated on 19.
La Academia:

- CD01 - Asi Es la Vida (Live) With Yahir & Hector -- (Elefante)
- CD02 - Hijo de la Luna -- (Mecano)
- CD03 - I Want it That Way With Jose Antonio -- (Backstreet Boys)
- CD04 - Soledad -- (La Oreja de Van Gogh)
- CD05 - Yo no soy esa Mujer -- (Paulina Rubio)
- CD08 - Se Fué -- (Laura Pausini)
- CD09 - Te Quiero -- (Miguel Bosé)
- CD10 - Mírame -- (Timbiriche)
- CD11 - Ay Amor -- (Flans)
- CD12 - Rueda mi Mente -- (Sasha Sokol)
- CD13 - Cuentame -- (Lucero)
- CD14 - No Llores por mi Argentina -- (Madonna)

La Academia's Special Editions:

- ELLAS - Hijo de la Luna -- (Mecano) & Mírame -- (Timbiriche)
- EDICION ESPECIAL - Hijo de la Luna -- (Mecano)

La Academia's Spinoffs:

- HOMENAJE A GRANDES DUETOS - Asereje With Laura & Azeneth -- (Las Ketcup)
- HOMENAJE A INTERPRETES ESPAÑOLES - Llueve sobre Mojado with Adrian Carvajal
- HOMENAJE A JUAN GABRIEL - No Lastimes Mas -- (Juan Gabriel)

=== María Inés ===
In 2003 she released a solo album with 9 songs, 3 brand new songs, 1 song in English, and 5 La Academia's Performances; The album is homonym and it was released only in Mexico, and it was not as good a seller as former La Academia's contestants like Yahir, Nadia or Myriam. She presented her solo album along with singing her first single on popular TV Azteca shows like "Ventaneando with Paty Chapoy" Her only single was Atraves de tu Recuerdo which had a very good acceptance in Mexico. The album track list is:

- 1 "Atrévete a Vivir"
- 2 "Se Fue" – (Laura Pausini)
- 3 "A través de tu Recuerdo"
- 4 "Soledad" – (La Oreja de Van Gogh)
- 5 "Te Amaré"
- 6 "Hijo de la Luna" – (Mecano)
- 7 "Rueda mi Mente" – (Sasha Sokol)
- 8 "DJ Tonight"
- 9 "No Llores por mi Argentina" – (Madonna)

=== El Diluvio que Viene ===
In 2007 she participated on the play called "El Diluvio que Viene" with Jaime Camil, play that record an album. The album track listing is:

- 1 "Un nuevo sitio disponer"
- 2 "Que pena que sea Pecado"
- 3 "Calma"
- 4 "Concierto para Cura y Campana"
- 5 "Tira el Dinero"
- 6 "Bella noche sin Sueño"
- 7 "Ahi va la Consuelo"
- 8 "Bella noche sin sueño (Reprise)"
- 9 "Las hormigas mueven la montaña"
- 10 "Balada de San Crispín"
- 11 "Que pena que sea Pecado (Reprise)"
- 12 "Clementina"
- 13 "Te Quiero"
- 14 "Cuando el arca de Detenga"
- 15 "Eso es Amor"
- 16 "Un nuevo sitio disponer (Reprise)"

=== Charts ===
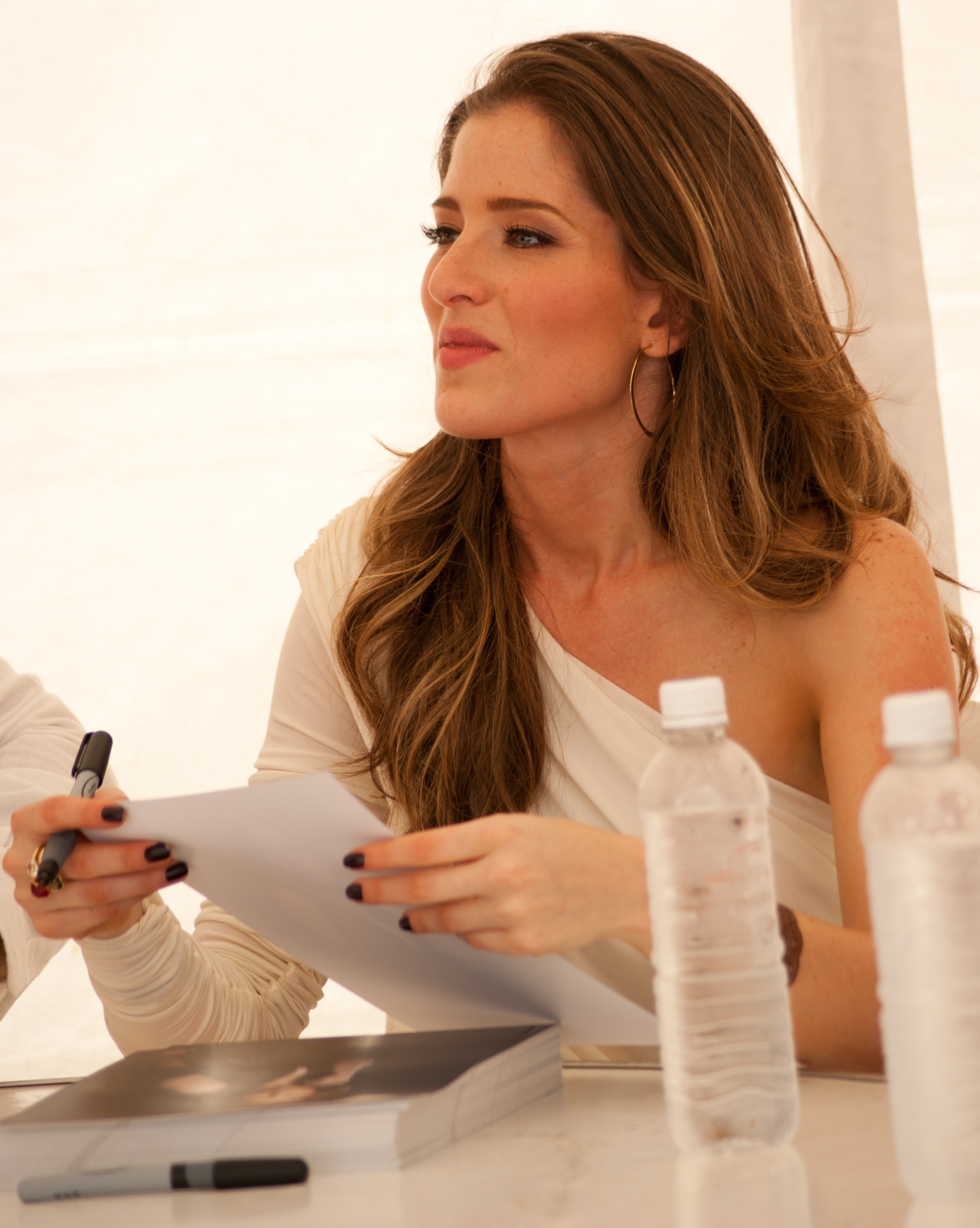
María Inés Guerra in January 2011

| Year | Album | Peak positions | | |
| Year | Album | U.S. | MEX | Sales |
|---|---|---|---|---|
| 2002 | La Academia: 21 studio albums; July 2002-Dec. 2002 | 1 | 1 | 1,500,000 |
| 2003 | María Inés: 1st studio album; 2003 | — | 4 | 10,000 |
| 2007 | El Diluvio que Viene: Play; 2007 | — | 40 | 10,000 |

| Year | Single | Chart Position | | |
| Year | Single | US | MEX | Album |
|---|---|---|---|---|
| 2003 | "A Través de tu Recuerdo" | — | 108 | María Inés |

== Personal life ==
In 2013 she married businessman Gustavo Guzmán Favela. Their first child was born in 2014.

== With TV Azteca ==
=== Azteca Novelas ===
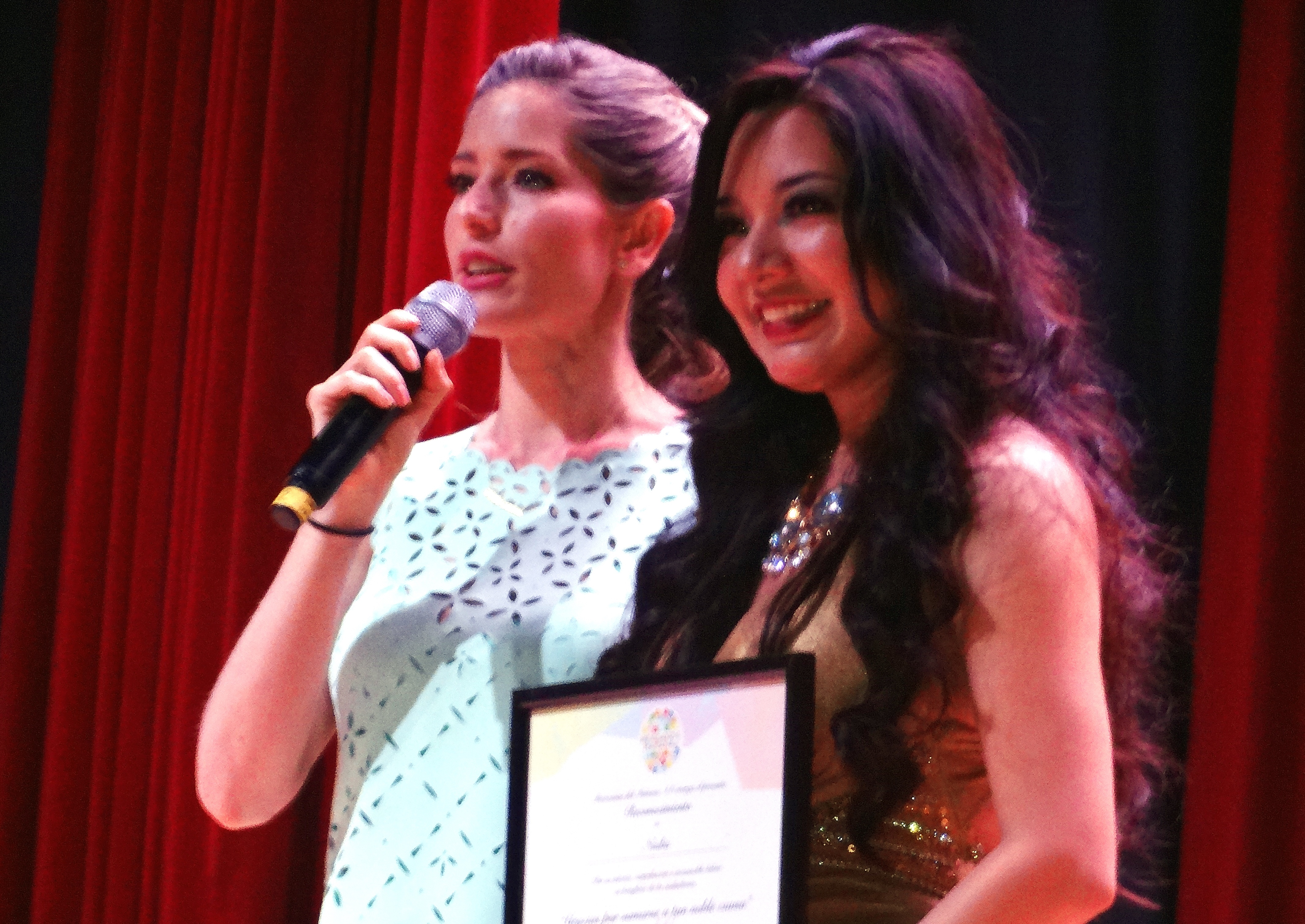
María Inés and Nadia during second concert with cause in 2015.

After her participation with the La Academia-related shows had ended, Maria Ines branched out into television. Her first and only participation in a telenovela was Enamorate, an innovative project by TV Azteca to obtain rating from teenagers and young adults. Ines was cast as the main antagonist, with singer Yahir and Mexican film actress Martha Higareda as the two protagonists. The success of the show was instant and the show was prolonged for 3 more months.

In 2008, she appeared in the leading role in Cambio de Vida, which was a show in the same line as Lo que callamos las mujeres.

She did a special episode of Lo que callamos las mujeres called "Las alas de mi alma" (the wings of my soul) where she told her story of how she got into La Academia". On June 12, 2009, Ma. Ines made her 2nd appearance on Lo que callamos las mujeres.

=== Morning time Department ===
Maria Ines was later part of Con Sello de Mujer a show, similar to the American The View, which she was part of for 2 years, surviving change after change within the show. After the network pulled the plug on the show.

She retrieved from Con Sello de Mujer to begin a new TV show called Chiflando y Aplaudiendo, A show that had jokes, different kinds of competitions between the audience members, gossip, etc. but it ended after few weeks on air.

She took the place of Rossanna Najera in Poker de Reinas for several episodes with Luz Blanchet, Anette Michel and Andrea Escalona, but her participation ended when she agreed to host the prologue of LA ACADEMIA ULTIMA GENERACION:CAMINO A LA FAMA leaving the show to the new La Academia's host Rafeal Araneda.

She have replaced the main hostess of Venga La Alegria for several non-consecutive episodes.

She has made several appearances as a special guest on the TV Azteca show called Para Todos, a game show hosted by Mimi ex vocalist of the female pop group Flans, Luis Armando 3rd place of the 6th Generation of La Academia, Formerly Televisa's host Mauricio Barcelata and Héctor Soberón, in which she sang with Luis Armando the hit song Todo Cambió of the famous band Camila.

=== Prime time department ===
In 2005, TV Azteca made a Mexican version of Dancing with the Stars in which Ma. Ines took place in both seasons, taking 4th place in the 1st one, losing to Pedro Sola and taking the 2nd place in the second one, losing to Edgar Galicia.

While hosting Con Sello de Mujer; she, as well, hosted the show Disco de Oro, along with José Luis Rodríguez "El Puma", which was a reality show, about '80s–'90s singers who at least have won a GOLD certification in their career; They will be voted-off one by one each Sunday, leaving the finalist who will dispute the award, which is the recording of a new album.

In 2007, she appeared on different episodes of the show Si te la sabes Cantala...Con Famosos but she never won. It was a show of completing the lyrics of different songs.

Disney and TV Azteca join forces and started a new show, which Ma.Ines hosted along with Roger. It was reality show calledHigh School Musical: La Seleccion, this was a Mexican spinoff of High School Musical and the Mexican version of High School Musical: Get in the Picture and it lasted 15 weeks.

She hosted a TV Azteca show called Aguas con el Muro with Martín Altomaro.

She Appeared on the 10th. Concert of La Academia Ultima Generacion, as the 14 artists of the 1st Generation get together to join the 12 students left on the Last Generation.

On January 6, Ma. Ines appeared as co-host of the Fundación Azteca's Jugueton which is sponsored by A Quien Corresponda host Jorge Garralda.

She has hosted along with Roger Gonzalez, host of ZAPPING ZONE, a TV Azteca Sunday-show called Planeta Disney, which carries all the Disney hottest news and movies.

Ma.Ines with Mauricio Barcelata hosted The Mexican independence special show on September 15.

After Mexico requested a new generation of La Academia, after being stated that the 6th. was the last one, a new generation was introduced and Ma. Ines participated as godmother of 2 participants of Guadalajara, Jalisco where she is originally from.

Ma.Ines will participate as the regular hostess of La Academia: Al Descubierto on Azteca 7, where a daily summary of what is happening in the house and backstage of the different concerts will be presented by her. She also hosted the La Academia: Fashion Week runway.

=== Entertainment Department ===
She joined the entertainment department, directed by Paty Chapoy.

After Ines Gomez Mont left the show Los 25+, a casting was made for the new hostess, in which Maria Ines made the final cut, making her the replacement for Ines and the new hostess of this Sunday show, making a new turn in her career, after being in daily and prime time entertainment for 5 years she switch to entertainment news, area directed by Paty Chapoy. Los 25+ is the funniest countdown in the Mexican television. Her new job has taken her to the front cover of the online magazine of Ventaneando with Paty Chapoy.

A TV special was broadcast on August 29 about Michael Jackson's death called ¿Quién mato a Michael Jackson?, in which Ma.Ines served as the main hostess.

In 2010, she started hosting a mini-show called 7 Expertos which is a show about a competition between 7 professional hairdressers.

María Inés is currently the host of FTV Mag México on the Fashion TV channel.

== Ma. Ines Television's Timeline ==
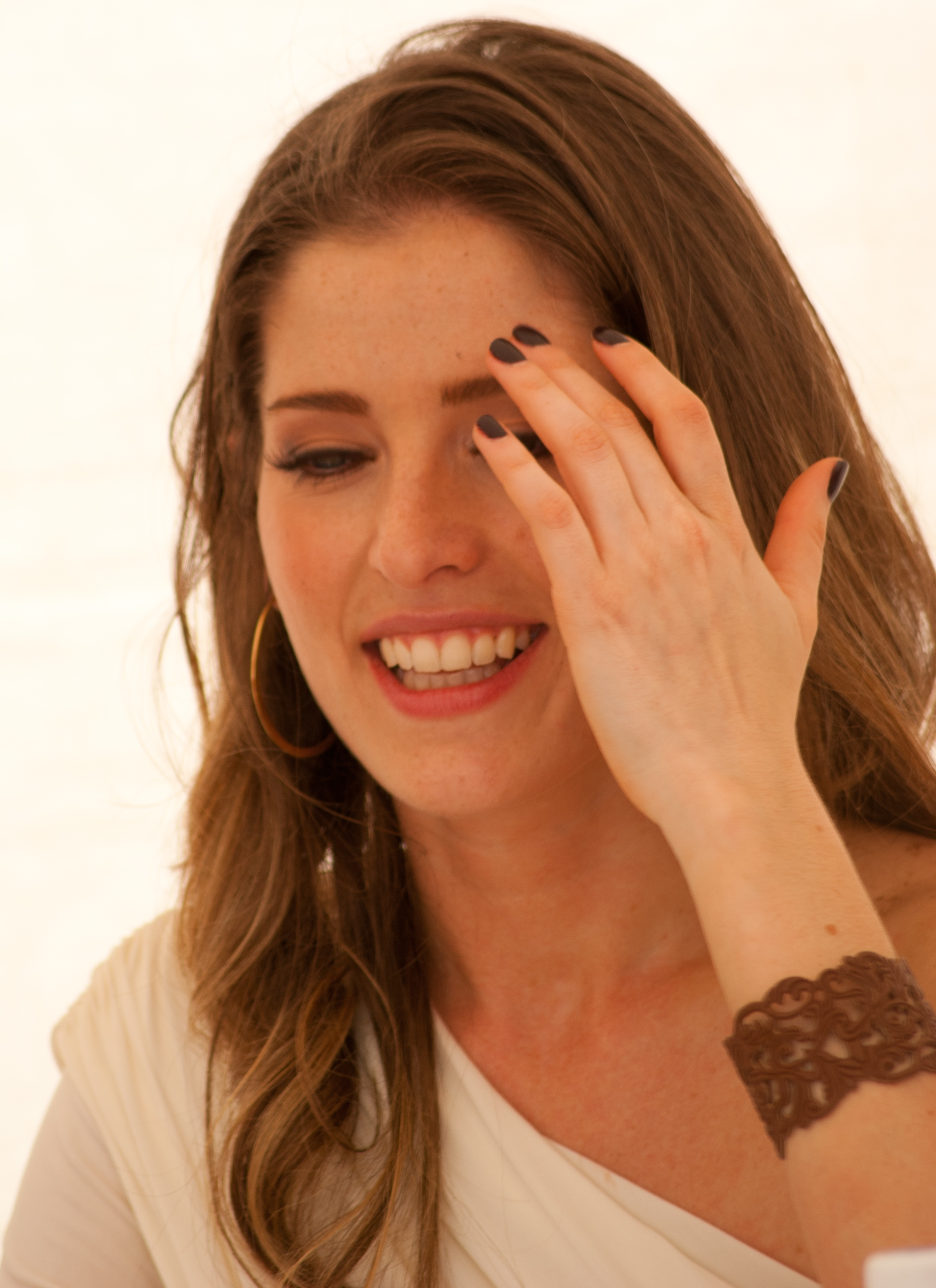
María Inés Guerra

=== Hostess ===
- 2004—Con sello de Mujer
- 2005-2007—Con sello de mujer
- 2007—Disco de oro
- 2007—Chiflando y aplaudiendo
- 2007—High School Musical: La Selección
- 2008—Poker de Reinas
- 2008—La Academia (6) : Camino à la Fama (Prologue)
- 2008—Aguas con el muro
- 2009—Juguetón
- 2009—Planeta Disney
- 2009-2015—Los 25+
- 2009—¿Quién mato a Michael Jackson?
- 2009—Mi México
- 2009—La Academia (7) : Al sescubierto
- 2010—7 Expertos
- 2010—FTV Mag México
- 2011—Update
- 2012—E! Latin News
- 2012-2013—Estilo DF
- 2013—El juguetón
- 2020—LCDP

=== Theater ===
- 2004—Las princesas y sus príncipes
- 2007—Peter Pan
- 2007—El diluvio que viene
- 2010—Los monólogos de la vagina

=== Guest ===
- 2007—Si te la sabes Cantala...Con Famosos
- 2008—La Academia Ultima Generación 10th. Concert
- 2009—Para Todos

=== Contestant ===
- 2002—La Academia
- 2003—Desafio de Estrellas & Homenaje
- 2005—Bailando por un millón 1
- 2005—Bailando por un millón 2

=== Actress ===
- 2004—Enamórate
- 2008—Lo que callamos las mujeres: canto a la vida
- 2008—Cambio de vida
- 2009—Lo que callamos las mujeres
- 2011—La florería de Sofía

On air

== Theater ==
She participated on the Mexican play Peter Pan as Tinkerbell next to Jaime Camil and Lolita Cortez, but her part was virtually as her schedule was really tight.

Her biggest shot on theater was on the play called El Diluvio Que Viene with Jaime Camil, later replaced by, Manuel Pereyra and Ernesto D'Alessio, and María Filipini, Carmen Delgado, Enrique de la Riva with Patricio Castillo.

In 2010 she was in the play The Vagina Monologues in Mexico City.

== Modeling career, radio and other appearances ==
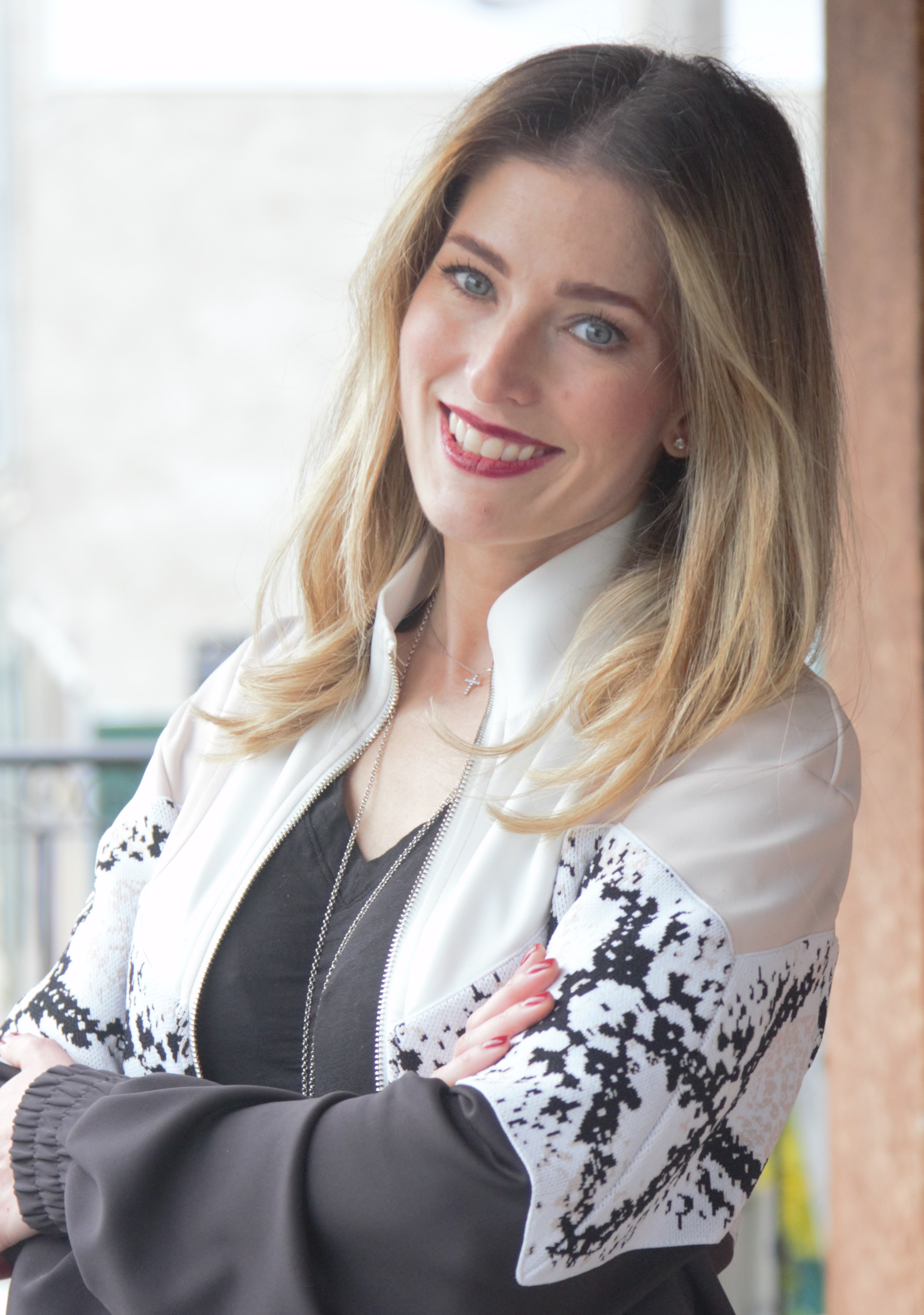
María Inés in 2022.

Along her TV career she has made a lot of commercials like Ecko with Evangelina Elizondo and Elektra.

She has modeled for "Modeli", a Shoe Campaign with Alan Tacher.

She was introduced by Quién Magazine, as one of the prettiest girls of Mexico, next to Yadhira from Nicky Klan and Belinda.

She have done some modeling as a Quinciañera and in the online magazine of Ventaneando with Paty Chapoy, where she appeared months later on the cover, introducing her as the new hostess of Los 25+.

María Inés has made several appearances in different magazines, like 2010 Elle Magazine(Latin America edition).

She has a 12 spread editorial photoshoot in the October '09 issue of Glow Magazine.

She has a photo spread in the December '09 issue of InStyle Magazine (Latin America edition).

Ana Silvia Garza, mother of Mariana Garza, revealed a book called "Pro age/Dove" in which 53 different personalities dedicate a thought to each one of their mothers. This book is a special edition made by the worldwide brand "Dove", which is not going to be on sale but they are going to be 253 copies among the famous women who made a contribution to the book. Where Ma.Ines participated with some of other thoughtfull women like Paola Rojas, Fernanda Familiar, Ana María Alvarado, Dominika Paleta and Liz Gallardo, among others.

She was on the radio broadcast on EXA FM every Sunday, bringing a summary of every concert of La Academia's 2009 New Generation.
