= Cada mañana =

Mexican television program

- Country of origin: Mexico

Original release
- Network: Azteca 13
- Release: July 24, 2000 – December 30, 2005

Related
- Venga la Alegría

Cada mañana (Spanish: Every Morning) was a morning television program on the Azteca 13 television network in Mexico, which aired from July 2000 to 2005.

== History ==
Cada mañana debuted on July 24, 2000. It was hosted by Leonardo Daniel, Laura Luz, Luz Blanchet, Ana María Alvarado and Paco Lala's, and Darío T. Pie. Daniel left in mid-August, after less than a month on air, and was replaced by actor Omar Fierro; Fierro would leave the program in December 2001 after a dispute with Blanchet and to produce programming for the new Azteca América network in the United States. He was replaced by Francisco de la O.

In November 2003, Laura Luz left for personal reasons. Her place was first taken by Betty Monroe, who became pregnant; she was then replaced by Venezuelan actress Ana La Salvia, who soon became pregnant as well. Blanchet departed the show in July 2004 as part of a relaunch that brought Flans singer Mimí and Francisco de la O on as hosts.

In November 2005, Ingrid Coronado was announced as a new presenter, beginning December 5; de la O would instead host another program for TV Azteca. However, a much larger overhaul was on its way; the program and Con sello de mujer, a women's program, were replaced by Venga la Alegría on January 2, 2006, with Coronado, La Salvia, and Fernando del Solar hosting.
