= Venga la alegría =

Mexican morning TV program

- Genre: Morning/talk show
- Presented by: Tábata Jalil; Sergio Sepúlveda; Ricardo Casares; Patricio Borghetti; Jimena Longoria; Capi Pérez; Kristal Silva; Mauricio Barcelata; Enrique Mayagoitia; Flor Rubio
- Country of origin: Mexico
- Original language: Spanish
- No. of seasons: 20

Production
- Executive producers: Sergio Sepúlveda (2006–2010, 2010-present); Adrián Patiño (2006–2010, 2010–2019); Roberto Romagnoli (2010); Dio Lluberes (2019–2022); Maru Silva (2023–present)
- Production company: TV Azteca

Original release
- Network: Azteca Uno
- Release: January 2, 2006

Related
- Cada mañana

Venga la alegría, abbreviated VLA, is a Mexican morning television show aired on the Azteca Uno network. It began broadcasting on January 2, 2006, and features segments on entertainment, health and beauty, cooking, and other topics. It competes with similar programs on TV Azteca's competitors, including Hoy on Las Estrellas and Sale el Sol on Imagen Televisión.

The show is known for its entertaining games, having some segments that vary, having a segment with different teams called Sin Palabras and having some gossip segments with something called Zona De Espectaculos (Entertainment Zone). And, the show also has a 'weekend edition' of the show with different hosts.

== History ==
VLA first appeared on January 2, 2006, as a replacement for the similarly formatted Cada mañana. Two of its original hosts, Ingrid Coronado and Ana La Salvia, had previously been on Cada mañana: they were joined by Argentine-Mexican presenter Fernando del Solar.

On November 13, 2024, the show was criticized for inviting Katy Perry, since she looked uncomfortable and the audience made fun of how the show was unprofessional with the activities created for her. She was invited there to promote her The Lifetimes Tour.
