= Mónica Noguera =

Mexican television personality (born 1971)

- Born: Mónica Noguera Flores; February 27, 1971 (age 54); Mexico City, Federal District, Mexico

Mónica Noguera Flores (born February 27, 1971, in Mexico City) is a Mexican television personality and currently the host of De Primera Mano on Imagen Televisión.

== Career ==
Noguera started her television career in the Mexican TV network TeleHit hosting Top 25, which presented the channel's best videos. After that she worked at Espacio Alternativo, Top Ten and then she had the opportunity to help all the new groups that were appearing, without forgetting her work at the program Al fin de semana.

As she commented: "To travel is one of the marvellous things that this job has given me, to be able to meet so many places and cultures worldwide... these trips give you a very different way to perceive life".

She is a regular guest reporting for "Al rojo vivo with María Celeste".

== De Primera Mano ==
Noguera has co-hosted Imagen Televisión's entertainment news show De Primera Mano with Gustavo Adolfo Infante and Michelle Rivalcaba since 2017. The program currently airs Monday through Friday from 15:00 p.m to 17:00 p.m (UTC).

== ¡Qué Chulada! ==
Noguera is one of the hosts on ¡Qué Chulada! alongside Verónica Toussaint, Mariana H y Annie Barrios, where the most relevant topics of the moment are discussed on the program, from the presenters' points of view.

== Personal life ==
Noguera was married to Telehit's main producer Guillermo del Bosque, but they divorced. Her second marriage is with a Dutch business man and they both live in Miami, which she later divorced and lived common law with Latin rock musician Fher Olvera, the lead singer and frontman of Maná, in 2013 and later broke up 2015.
