= Who's the Boss? =

American sitcom (1984–1992)

- Genre: Sitcom
- Created by: Martin Cohan; Blake Hunter
- Directed by: Asaad Kelada (seasons 1–6); Various (seasons 1–4); Tony Singletary (seasons 7–8)
- Starring: Tony Danza; Judith Light; Alyssa Milano; Danny Pintauro; Katherine Helmond
- Theme music composer: Martin Cohan and Blake Hunter (lyrics); Larry Carlton and Robert Kraft (music)
- Country of origin: United States
- Original language: English
- No. of seasons: 8
- No. of episodes: 196 (list of episodes)

Production
- Executive producers: Martin Cohan; Blake Hunter; Danny Kallis (season 8); Tony Danza (season 8)
- Production locations: Universal Studios Hollywood (1983 pilot at Stage 42; 1984–1985 at Stage 44); Sunset Gower Studios (1985–1988 at Stage 77; 1988–1992 at Stage 15)
- Camera setup: Videotape; Multi-camera
- Running time: 23 minutes
- Production companies: Embassy Television (seasons 1–2); Embassy Communications (seasons 3–4); Hunter/Cohan Productions (seasons 4–8); ELP Communications (seasons 4–8); Columbia Pictures Television (seasons 4–8)

Original release
- Network: ABC
- Release: September 20, 1984 – April 25, 1992

Related
- The Upper Hand; Living Dolls

Who's the Boss? is an American sitcom television series created by Martin Cohan and Blake Hunter, that aired on ABC from September 20, 1984, to April 25, 1992, with a total of 196 half-hour episodes spanning eight seasons. It was produced by Hunter-Cohan Productions in association with Embassy Television (later Embassy Communications and ELP Communications) and Columbia Pictures Television and stars Tony Danza as Tony Micelli, a former Major League Baseball athlete and widower who strives to raise his daughter, Samantha Micelli (Alyssa Milano), outside of the hectic nature of New York City and relocates her to Fairfield, Connecticut, where he works as a live-in housekeeper for a single advertising executive named Angela Bower (Judith Light). The series' cast also includes Katherine Helmond as Angela's mother, Mona Robinson, and Danny Pintauro as Angela's young son, Jonathan Bower.

The show became one of the most popular sitcoms of the 1980s. The series was nominated for more than 40 awards, including ten Primetime Emmy Awards and five Golden Globe Award nominations, winning one of each, although early reviews of the series were lukewarm. Also very successful in the ratings, Who's the Boss? ranked in the top ten in the final primetime ratings between 1985 and 1989, and has since continued in syndication worldwide.

== Plot ==
Widower Anthony Morton "Tony" Micelli is a former Major League Baseball player who was forced to retire due to a shoulder injury. Wanting to move out of Brooklyn to find a better environment for his daughter, Samantha, he takes a job in the upscale suburb of Fairfield, Connecticut, as a live-in housekeeper for divorced advertising executive Angela Bower and her young son Jonathan. He and Samantha move into the Bower home. Also appearing is Angela's feisty, sexually progressive mother Mona Robinson, who dates all kinds of men, from college-age to silver-haired CEOs.

The title of the show refers to the role reversal of Tony and Angela. Angela is the breadwinner of the home, Tony stays at home to take care of the household and provides guidance and support to the children, Samantha and Jonathan. It challenged contemporary stereotypes of young, Italian-American males as macho, boorish, and wholly ignorant of life outside of urban working-class neighborhoods. Tony was depicted as sensitive, intelligent, and domestic with an interest in intellectual pursuits, and yet still athletic and streetwise.

The easy-going, spontaneous Tony and the driven, self-controlled Angela are attracted to each other, though both are uncomfortable with the notion for much of the show's run. While there is playful banter and many hints of their feelings for each other, Tony and Angela do their best to avoid facing this aspect of their developing relationship and date other people. Angela has a steady romantic interest in Geoffrey Wells (Robin Thomas), while Tony has a variety of girlfriends who come and go, including Kathleen Sawyer (Kate Vernon) in seasons six and seven.

Keeping ties with Tony's and Sam's Brooklyn roots is motherly former neighbor Mrs. Rossini (Rhoda Gemignani), who ends up becoming a thorn in Mona's side. Several other friends turn up a few times each season, sometimes in New York, sometimes in Connecticut.

Angela eventually strikes out on her own and opens an ad firm in season three, while Tony decides to go back to school at Fairfield University, enrolling in the same college that daughter Samantha would later attend. Sam's best friend Bonnie (Shana Lane-Block) is a recurring character during these seasons, while romance comes into her life in the form of her boyfriend Jesse Nash (Scott Bloom) during her sophomore year of high school.

At the start of season eight, Tony and Angela finally acknowledge their love for each other. However, the series does not end with the widely expected marriage but on a more ambiguous note. This was due primarily to concerns by the network that a marriage, representing a definitive ending, could hurt syndication. Danza also vehemently opposed the marriage, saying it would contradict the original purpose of the show.

== Cast ==
Cast of Who's the Boss?

- Tony Danza as Tony Micelli
- Judith Light as Angela Robinson Bower
- Alyssa Milano as Samantha Micelli
- Danny Pintauro as Jonathan Bower
- Katherine Helmond as Mona Robinson
- Jonathan Halyalkar as William "Billy" Napoli (Season 7)

== Episodes ==
Season	Episodes	Originally released		Rank	Rating	Viewers (millions)
Season	Episodes	First released	Last released	Rank	Rating	Viewers (millions)
1	22	September 20, 1984	April 16, 1985	31	15.8	—N/a
2	26	September 24, 1985	May 13, 1986	10	21.1	—N/a
3	24	September 23, 1986	May 19, 1987	10	22.0	—N/a
4	24	September 22, 1987	May 17, 1988	6	21.2	—N/a
5	25	October 18, 1988	May 16, 1989	7	20.8	30.9
6	26	September 19, 1989	May 8, 1990	12	17.9	27.3
7	25	September 18, 1990	May 7, 1991	19	15.0 (Note: Tied with The CBS Sunday Movie)	21.9
8	24	September 28, 1991	April 25, 1992	76	8.5	13.0

== Background ==
Who's the Boss? was created by television producers and business partners Martin Cohan and Blake Hunter in 1983. In early development, the series was titled You're the Boss, about Angela employing Tony and the gender role reversal. Before the fall 1984 premiere, the producers changed it to Who's the Boss?, an open-ended title which hinted that any one of the leads could get their way and be the "boss". Unlike Danza, who had served as the Tony prototype from the beginning, Judith Light was one of many who auditioned for the role of Angela. She was eventually cast based on her performance, which Hunter commented was a "class [...] Jean Harlow type, or more of a Meryl Streep." The character of Mona was initially created as an older sister to Angela, but as Cohan and Hunter struggled to handle the casting of the role, they decided on re-writing the role into "a free spirit with a quick tongue," who they envisioned Katherine Helmond to play. Danny Pintauro and Alyssa Milano were also cast based on their auditions.

The series' pilot was shot in November 1983, a full 10 months before the show actually went on the air. ABC originally was planning to put it on mid-season in January 1984, but due to creative differences between the producers and the network, the show was delayed until the next season. The show debuted on September 20, 1984, up against the debut of another sitcom, NBC's The Cosby Show.

In the fall of 1991, after seven years on its established Tuesday night slot, Who's the Boss? was moved to Saturday nights at 8:00 p.m. (against NBC's The Golden Girls), along with fellow long-running sitcom Growing Pains. In February 1992, ABC added the long-running Perfect Strangers and the new cartoon Capitol Critters to the night. It was promoted as the new I Love Saturday Night lineup, an equivalent to the hit Friday TGIF block. Who's the Boss? moved to 8:30 p.m., with Capital Critters as its lead-in. The I Love Saturday Night banner proved to be short-lived, folding on February 29, 1992; Who's the Boss? moved back into the Saturday 8/7c slot in early March.

The series's ratings dropped significantly in its new time slot, and the decision was made to end the series in the spring of 1992. The hour-long series finale aired on Saturday, April 25, 1992, along with the finales for Growing Pains and MacGyver. Who's the Boss? reruns continued to air through the summer.

== Influence ==
=== Critical reception ===
Early reviews of the series were lukewarm. Jerry Buck, writing for Ocala Star-Banner, noted that while the series "doesn't have the same impact [as The Cosby Show], it's not bad, either." He compared Danza and Light's on-screen chemistry to Katharine Hepburn and Spencer Tracy. The Pittsburgh Press criticized that "the show may have a universal theme [but] it's hard to find," while Duane Dudek of Milwaukee Journal Sentinel summed the series as a "pleasant little sitcom" which was not a "struggle for mastery [but] in some ways, a rather old-fashioned love story." John J. O'Connor of The New York Times was complimentary of the female leads, Light and Helmond, but was concerned if Danza, who "spends a good deal of time with his shirt off and his thick weight-lifted physique" would "keep this sitcom in ratings shape."

=== Awards and nominations ===
Who's the Boss? was nominated for more than forty awards, including ten Primetime Emmy Award and five Golden Globe Award nominations, winning one each; Katherine Helmond received the 1989 Golden Globe Award for Best Supporting Actress – Series, Miniseries or Television Film, while Mark J. Levin was awarded the 1989 Emmy Award for Outstanding Lighting Direction for a Comedy Series for his work on the episode "Two on a Billboard." Frequently nominated at the annual Young Artist Awards, Milano earned three awards for her portrayal of Samantha. Danny Pintauro and recurring guest Scott Bloom received one award each.

== Theme song ==
The show's theme song, "Brand New Life", was written by series creators and executive producers Cohan and Hunter, with music composed by Larry Carlton and Robert Kraft. Three versions were used throughout the series' run, which were performed by Larry Weiss (1984–1986), Steve Wariner (1986–1990), and Jonathan Wolff (1990–1992). The third version was first used for the last eight episodes of season six, and a very minor revision of that particular version of the theme was used during seasons seven and eight.

The first line of the theme song was changed from "There is more to life than what you're living" to "There's a time for love and a time for living" in season three onwards.

== Distribution ==
=== Syndication ===
ABC aired reruns of Who's the Boss? at 11:00 a.m. (EST) during its daytime schedule from June 1, 1987, until July 1, 1988; it was later replaced by Growing Pains on the daytime schedule. The series entered off-network syndication to premiere in September 1989; the show was a success in syndication and was offered to local stations including Los Angeles–based KCAL-TV and Secaucus, New Jersey–based WWOR-TV throughout the 1990s. TBS premiered the show in October 1994 for one full hour at 7:05 p.m. EST until July 1995 when it moved to one airing at 6:35 p.m. EST weekdays. TBS moved the show to mornings where it aired from October 1995 until December 1996. TBS would bring back the show for one last time August 1997 to October 1997 again airing one full hour at 7:05 p.m. EST. From 2004 to 2007, the show was syndicated through The Program Exchange.

Fox Family/ABC Family aired the series in 1999 until 2003. Nick at Nite broadcast the show between 2004 and 2006. In 2005, TV Land broadcast the show as part of Nick at Nite's 20th Anniversary Celebration. The series also aired on Ion Television from July 2007 to February 2008, airing Monday-Thursdays at 9:00 and 9:30 pm. EST. It began airing on the Hallmark Channel in an early afternoon weekday block beginning on May 17, 2010, and ran until April 2, 2011. The series began airing on TVGN in July 2012, and on Hub Network from April 1 until July 12, 2013. On June 1, 2014, the show joined the regular TV Land schedule.

Several episodes from seasons one, two, and eight was formerly viewed for free in Minisode format on Crackle, formerly owned by Sony Pictures Television and Amazon's IMDb TV service.

On August 22, 2019, it was announced that Antenna TV would be airing reruns of the series in the fall of 2020. On July 20, 2020, Antenna TV announced that they would begin airing reruns of the series on October 5, 2020, until it was removed a year later in August 2021. Antenna TV brought back the show on January 4, 2026, airing Sundays from 7:00 p.m. to 9:00 p.m. EST.

The series began to air on the new Great American Family network on Monday, November 29, 2021.

The series also began to air on Rewind TV when it launched on September 1, 2021, and on IFC on March 24, 2023.

In Canada, the entire series can be streamed for free on the CTV's streaming service, CTV Throwback.

The series is currently available for streaming online on Sony Pictures' YouTube channel, Throw Back TV in the United States and on Tubi.

The entire series is currently available to stream on Hulu as of December 8, 2023.

Some episodes of the show are currently available on Sling TV.

=== Home media ===
Columbia TriStar Home Entertainment released the first season of Who's the Boss? on DVD in Region 1 on June 8, 2004. The remaining seven seasons have yet to be released due to copyright issues.

== Spin-offs ==
The first attempted Who's the Boss? spin-off had its origins in the final episode of season two, "Charmed Lives", a backdoor pilot for a program about two women up for the same job as well as overall being a series about the lives of single career women in the '80s. Starring Fran Drescher and Donna Dixon, it was not picked up as a series.

In 1987, producers had planned a spin-off entitled Mona, which focused on Mona's character leaving Angela to help her brother Cornelius run a seedy hotel in Manhattan. The third season featured this plot in a two-part episode, but when ABC changed their mind about the spinoff, fearing what Mona's departure could mean to the show, the ending was rewritten to feature Mona returning to Angela's home.

The third attempted spin-off, which did make it to series, was titled Living Dolls. Premiering and ending in 1989, the show starred Leah Remini, Michael Learned, and Halle Berry. The show featured Remini, who had appeared in two Who's the Boss? episodes as a friend of Samantha's, as a homeless model taken under the wing of an agent played by Learned. In those same Who's the Boss? episodes, Jonathan Ward played Learned's son Rick; in the Living Dolls series, David Moscow took over the role.

== Planned reboot/sequel series ==
In August 2020, a revival/sequel of the series was announced, with Tony Danza and Alyssa Milano returning as their roles of Tony and Samantha Micelli, respectively. In June 2022, the sequel series was slated to premiere on Amazon Freevee. However, in October 2024, they would not move forward with it, shopping it around to other channels.

== International versions ==
Several versions of Who's the Boss? have been produced for foreign television markets. Some are dubbed and others are remakes. In many cases the names of the lead characters were changed:

- Aired in India, Saamne wali khidki (translated as Front Window) airing on Star Plus in 2000 starred Archana Puran Singh as Sanjana and Akshay Anand as Rohit. Here, the housekeeper was a struggling actor living as paying guest who has a niece who is the same age as Sanjana's son. There is no sexual tension between Rohit and Sanjana, although she is a divorcee and is hit upon by her neighbor, retired Army man Kukreja Bharat Kapoor and various recurring guest stars.
- Aired in France starting 1987, first on Antenne 2 (now France 2), then on M6. The show was renamed Madame est servie ("Dinner is served", but literally "Madam is served", referring to Tony being Angela's housekeeper). When the entire series aired in Canada on Radio-Canada as Coeur a Tout (Heart for Everything), only the pilot intro was used (with shots of the van going around the block after leaving Tony's apartment, and a shot of Samantha and Tony in the van).
- In Italy, the first two seasons were aired in 1989 on minor network Odeon TV as Casalingo Superpiù (Super Housekeeper); Katherine Helmond's character name was changed from Mona to Moira because in Italian, "mona" means "pussy".
- In the United Kingdom, The Upper Hand aired on ITV from 1990 to 1996 while the original Who's The Boss? was screened on the individual ITV regional stations. The show starred Joe McGann, Diana Weston, and Honor Blackman in the roles originally played by Tony Danza, Judith Light and Katherine Helmond respectively. In 1993, Helmond herself appeared in an episode of this version as Madame Alexandra.
- Though the show had been broadcast in Germany in a dubbed version as Wer ist hier der Boss? (Who is the Boss Here?) since 1992 on RTL Television, a year later, the channel produced 15 early episodes with a German cast. The show was called Ein Job fürs Leben (A Job for Life). Tony was renamed Vito, an Italian guest worker from Berlin-Neukölln and former striker of soccer club Hertha BSC. Angela Bower was renamed Barbara Hoffmann. Their home was located in Hamburg's upscale suburb Othmarschen. Despite these little changes, the original scripts were used for shooting, and even the stage set was an almost identical replica of the original American set, with only minor details changed, such as paintings and bric-a-brac in German style. RTL Television gave the same treatment to Married... with Children under the title Hilfe, meine Familie spinnt (Help! My family is nuts!) with 26 episodes. The two shows shared the first hour on Thursdays in the prime time slot from 8:15 pm to 10:15 pm.
- A Spanish-language version, produced in Mexico by TV Azteca and Columbia TriStar International Television, debuted in 1998 under the title Una familia con Ángel (A Family with Angel) starring Laura Luz and Daniel Martínez. It was broadcast in the U.S. on the Telemundo network.
- In Brazil, Rede Bandeirantes produced with Columbia TriStar International Television a Portuguese-language version of the show called Santo de Casa (House Saint), starring Daniel Boaventura, Regina Remencius and Ana Lúcia Torre. This version debuted in 1999.
- In 2005, the Argentinian network Telefé also made its own local version called ¿Quién es el Jefe? (Who is the Boss?), a direct translation of the original American title. It starred Nicolás Vázquez, Gianella Neyra and Carmen Barbieri in the adult roles.
- In 2006, a Russian remake premiered that was titled Kto v dome khozyain? (which translates as "Who is the head in this house?"). It starred Anna Nevskaya (as Daria, the boss) and Andrey Noskov (as Nikita, the housekeeper). It originally aired for three years on CTC and used most of the episodes of the American original and concludes with the wedding of the main characters in the 150th episode.
- In 2006, Colombian network Caracol TV produced ¿Quién manda a quién? (which translates as Who Commands Whom?) (which was the title of the original show when dubbed in Spanish).
- A Polish version, I kto tu rządzi? (And Who is in Charge Here?), debuted in 2007 on Polsat, starring Małgorzata Foremniak and Bogusław Linda.
- In Turkey, it is aired as Patron Kim? (Who is the Boss?) on ATV Turkey.
