= De Primera Mano =

- Genre: News show
- Created by: Laura Flores
- Presented by: Gustavo Adolfo Infante; Mónica Noguera; Michelle Ruvalcaba

Production
- Production locations: Mexico City, Mexico (2017–present)
- Camera setup: Multi-camera
- Running time: 120 minutes (including commercials)
- Production company: Grupo Imagen

Original release
- Network: Imagen Televisión
- Release: July 24, 2017 – present

Related
- No Lo Cuentes

De Primera Mano (English: First Hand) is a Mexican entertainment news show produced and broadcast by Imagen Televisión since July 24, 2017. The program is characterized by providing information on the latest shows, from which the criticism and opinion of the conductors will be more objective and direct towards the most controversial and shocking of artists in general.

It is broadcast live from the studios of Ciudad Imagen on Av. Copilco, Coyoacán in Mexico City, Mexico, and is hosted by Gustavo Adolfo Infante, Mónica Noguera and Michelle Ruvalcaba. It currently airs Monday through Friday from 15:00 p.m to 17:00 p.m (UTC).

== Promotion ==
For the promotion of the program, three spots were recorded accompanied by star figures such as the actress Itatí Cantoral, accompanied by her daughter Maria Itatí, Lis Vega and the conductor and actor, Raúl Magaña.

== Presenters ==
- Gustavo Adolfo Infante (2017–present)
- Mónica Noguera (2017–present)
- Michelle Ruvalcaba (2017–present)

=== Former ===
- Alexia Almeida (2017–18)
