= Maxine Woodside =

Mexican radio and television host (born 1948)

- Born: 22 August 1948 (age 77); Mexico City, Mexico
- Occupations: Radio host and Television presenter
- Years active: 1989–present
- Spouse: Fernando Iriarte (m. 1966; div. 1969)
- Children: Alejandro (b. 1967 - 2022); Fernando (b. 1969)

Maxine Woodside (born 22 August 1948) is a Mexican radio and television host, known as the 'Queen of the Radio' and the main host of the radio show Todo para la Mujer, which has been transmitted through Radio Formula since October 16, 1989, also airing on television through Teleformula.

== Biography ==
Her father Garrett Woodside Davenport was born in Missouri, and moved to Mexico to work as an airline pilot for Mexicana de Aviación. Her mother Angelina Sotomayor was born in Guadalajara. Maxine is their only daughter. She has several siblings from her parents' prior marriages: her older sister Alma Guzmán, who was married to the actor Joaquín Cordero; her brother Garret, who died in a car accident; and an older sister, who died prior to Woodside's birth.

Woodside was married to Fernando Iriarte, with whom she had two sons: Alejandro Iriarte and Fernando Iriarte; the latter was married for ten years to the Mexican singer Yuri, and then married the singer Mayte Lascurain from the Mexican musical group Pandora, with whom he remained married for another ten years. After her divorce she had a 55-year relationship with Roger A. Madero.

== Radio and television ==
Woodside started her career as a model for a boot company called Bobby Boots in Mexico. She then moved to the news programs within Televisa where she gave the weather forecast, next to news shows with hosts including Joaquín López-Dóriga, Ricardo Rocha, and Juan Ruiz Healy. She then joined the work group of Jacobo Zabludovsky where she developed entertainment and cultural TV capsules.

In 1989 she joined Grupo Radio Formula as the main host of the radio program Todo para la Mujer, where she had as her first guest Yuri. There were several hurdles during the beginning of the program as Woodside was banned from Televisa, and therefore actors and signers from Televisa would not appear on her radio show.

In 1997 she returns to Televisa with the TV program De Boca en Boca, focused on celebrity and entertainment news. Her co-hosts included Ana Maria Alvarado, Verónica Gallardo and Fabián Lavalle.

In 2001 she hosted Trapitos al Sol, another TV program focused on celebrity and entertainment news. Her co-hosts included Juan José Origel, Horacio Villalobos, Alfonso Vera, and Esteban Arce.

She has also appeared on the following TV programs:

- Esperanza del corazón - 2011
- Mujeres Asesinas - 2010
- Premios TV y Novelas - 2008
- 100 Mexicanos Dijeron - 2004
- Big Brother VIP: México - 2004
- Pa’lante con Cristina - 2004
