= S.O.S.: Sexo y otros secretos =

- Season 1 poster
- Genre: Television series
- Written by: Martha Carrillo; Cristina García; Benjamín Cann
- Directed by: Benjamín Cann
- Starring: Susana Zabaleta; Susana González; Luz María Zetina; Marina de Tavira; Claudia Ramírez; Chantal Andere
- Opening theme: "Ay mujeres" by La Forquetina
- Country of origin: Mexico
- Original language: Spanish
- No. of seasons: 2
- No. of episodes: 26

Production
- Executive producers: Javier Williams; Andrea Salas
- Producer: Andrés Tovar
- Editors: Felipe Ortiz; Juan Alfredo Villareal
- Production company: Televisa

Original release
- Network: Canal 5
- Release: May 15, 2007 – December 9, 2008

S.O.S.: Sexo y otros secretos (English: S.O.S.: Sex and Other Secrets) is a Mexican television series produced by Javier Williams and Andrea Salas that premiered on Canal 5 on May 15, 2007 and ended on December 9, 2008. It stars Susana Zabaleta, Susana González, Luz María Zetina, Marina de Tavira, Claudia Ramírez, and Chantal Andere. The series narrates the lives of five women facing a world full of sex, infidelities and secrets.

== Premise ==
Five women have different ways of seeing life, sometimes complementary and sometimes contrary, but they share a concept of solidarity and friendship between them that makes them a charming group. Each episode tells how they live, how they met, how their friendship was born, their most intimate desires and the secrets that they keep for fear of being rejected or judged. The series also shows the sexual experiences that have marked their character, the desire to take charge of their lives and become complete women, to find self-confidence and personal satisfaction, and share their struggle to overcome their limitations and grow as human beings.

== Cast ==
=== Main ===
- Susana Zabaleta as Sofía (season 1)
- Susana González as Tania
- Luz María Zetina as Maggie
- Marina de Tavira as Pamela
- Claudia Ramírez as Irene
- Julio Bracho as Xavier (season 1; guest in season 2)
- Pedro Damián as Genaro (season 1)
- Benny Ibarra as Gabriel
- Miguel Rodarte as Boris
- Emilio Echevarría as Misty (season 1)
- José Angel Bichir as Beto (season 1)
- Paty Díaz as Marcia (season 1)
- Cristina Mason as Irenita
- Darío T. Pie as Darío de Gavira (season 1)
- Zuria Vega as Roberta
- Azela Robinson as Lucía (season 1)
- Enrique Singer as Levy (season 2)
- Odiseo Bichir as Tovar (season 2)
- Rafael Amaya as Martín (season 2)
- Chantal Andere as Natalia (season 2)

=== Recurring ===
- Diana Bracho as Isadora

== Episodes ==
=== Series overview ===
Season	Episodes	Originally released	
Season	Episodes	First released	Last released
1	13	May 15, 2007	August 14, 2007
2	13	September 23, 2008	December 9, 2008

=== Season 1 (2007) ===
No. overall	No. in season	Title	Original release date
1	1	"Nuevos amores, amargas decepciones"	May 15, 2007
Sofía, Tania, Maggie, Pamela and Irene share their experiences of their first sexual relationship and comment on how long ago their last orgasm was. For each of them, the relationship they have with men is very different. Irene discovers that her husband cheats on her.
2	2	"Deséame"	May 22, 2007
Gabriel falls from the sky and steals Maggie's car, ruining her dinner with Darío. Irene decides that her husband's infidelity will be a secret, and she finds out about Xavier's accident. Roberta and Beto will have the support of their friends.
3	3	"Date cuenta"	May 29, 2007
Irene's plan should be more thorough than she thought, because her revenge could kill Xavier. Maggie has fallen in love with Gabriel but she refuses to accept it. However, Gabriel will continue trying. Tania will receive a surprise from Boris.
4	4	"Soledad"	June 12, 2007
Pamela could sleep with Genaro. Tania and Boris try to resolve their marital situation. Maggie flees from love, but Gabriel insists. Irene will try to save her marriage, and will have to face what fate has prepared for her.
5	5	"Extrañas decisiones"	June 19, 2007
Maggie sends an SOS, she found condoms in Roberta's room. Irene thinks that Xavier already learned his lesson. He will receive unpleasant news. Pamela begins an employment relationship with Lucía, Genaro's wife.
6	6	"Recuerdos y secretos"	June 26, 2007
Beto is very excited about the private sex lessons Sofía is giving him. Tania is disappointed in Boris and perceives something strange in him, she ignores that he lost his job. Pamela and Lucía start a business as partners.
7	7	"Día negro"	July 3, 2007
Sofía lives a day of black memories, but is surprised to be able to share her pain with someone. Genaro does not know who Pamela is associating with. Irene is terrified that Marcia has returned to claim Irenita as her daughter.
8	8	"Atando cabos"	July 10, 2007
Sofía and Misty have issues that they could not fix in the past due to fear of facing reality. Maggie has decided to carry out the plan to pretend to be lesbian so that Darío stops harassing her. Irene knows that Irenita, Marcia and Xavier are hiding something from her.
9	9	"Palabras inesperadas"	July 17, 2007
During her father's birthday party, Irenita confesses to all the guests that she is pregnant. Sofía tells Maggie her sad past, from which the black day is born. Roberta and Beto have their first time just like Maggie and Gabriel.
10	10	"Lejos de casa"	July 24, 2007
Pamela realizes that her partner Lucía is Genaro's wife. Gabriel shows Darío the photos of Maggie and Sofia, with the intention that he moves away from her. Marcia, Xavier and Irene begin the search for Irenita, who escapes from her home and arrives at Maggie's home asking for accommodation.
11	11	"La fiesta"	July 31, 2007
Pamela presents her resignation to Genaro and confesses to Lucía that she is her husband's lover. Tania and Boris are at a critical point in their marriage, just when they receive a visit from the least expected person. Maggie is surprised to be reunited with someone she has not seen in a long time.
12	12	"Sexo y más secretos"	August 7, 2007
After the reunion of Sofía with Misty, she does not manage to forget him and decides to look for him. Maggie confesses to Santiago that Roberta is his daughter. Pamela and Lucía make a plan to get revenge on Genaro. Boris gets a job without knowing that Tania arranged for Xavier to hire him again.
13	13	"Amigas por siempre"	August 14, 2007
Irene is disappointed to learn that her husband has also been unfaithful with her friends. The question is with which of the four. Boris realizes that Tania treats him like a son, so he has lost her confidence. Laura, Sofía's sister, is about to die.

=== Season 2 (2008) ===
No. overall	No. in season	Title	Original release date
14	1	"El regreso"	September 23, 2008
After an accident, Maggie, Irene and Tania have a second chance after going through the tunnel of light that unites life with death. Now, these three friends will fight to discover the secret behind a murder.
15	2	"Sangre"	September 23, 2008
Maggie, Irene and Tania, horrified by Xavier's corpse, plan what to do with him. The producer of the novel asks Maggie to revive the character of Pepe. Levi looks for Irene to be president of the company.
16	3	"El lobo feroz"	September 30, 2008
Irene asks Tania for help to find out what kind of business Xavier had and who Levy really is. Maggie will have to convince Martín to return to production.
17	4	"El plan"	October 7, 2008
The friends meet to plan a strategy and prevent the police from discovering their secret. Boris observes something or someone through his telescope. Maggie receives Soledad, Martín's cousin, so that she also lives in her house.
18	5	"El cuerpo de de Xavier"	October 14, 2008
A message from SOS gathers the three friends so that, with the help of Soledad, they dig into the vacant lot where they hid Xavier's body, but when trying to remove him, they get a surprise.
19	6	"Cenicienta"	October 21, 2008
The attraction that exists between Boris and Melissa endangers Tania's marriage. Gabriel looks for Maggie after almost a year. Tovar begins to suspect the relationship between some heels and murder.
20	7	"Un correctivo"	October 28, 2008
Martín complicates things for Gabriel. Tania meets Melisa, her neighbor. Maggie discusses with Martín and makes him leave her home. Irene is threatened with death, so Tovar thinks of something to save her life.
21	8	"Un beso"	November 4, 2008
Martín blackmails Maggie. To get out of prison, Natalia helps Irene avoid dirty business. Tania entrusts Berenice with the attraction she feels. Boris keeps an important secret. Maggie goes to Gabriel's exhibition.
22	9	"Un cuchillo"	November 11, 2008
Tania suspects that she is pregnant, but does not understand how it could have happened, since she has not had sex for more than a year. Boris is the only one who knows what really happened. Levy orders Irene to fire Natalia.
23	10	"Un milagro"	November 18, 2008
Pamela returns very changed and her anger is a threat to several people. Tania no longer wants to live with the doubt and decides to take a pregnancy test. Boris is chased by Melisa's ex-husband, an aggressive boxer who will not stop until he has him in his hands.
24	11	"Hoja en blanco"	November 25, 2008
Pamela enters Irene's house to kill her. Natalia disappears. Maggie and Gabriel could fix their misunderstandings. Tania manages to make Boris confess the truth about her pregnancy.
25	12	"La llave"	December 2, 2008
The boxer hits Boris. Tania, Irene and Maggie discover Natalia and Xavier's bodies frozen. They take Natalia's body to a park and Xavier's to his house, where Tovar discovers him.
26	13	"Feliz cumpleaños"	December 9, 2008
Irenita is kidnapped by Levy. Irene and Tovar hide a key. Maggie improvises a happy ending for Pepe. Levy is arrested by Tovar. The friends go to the bank with the key, but before they can do anything they are victims of an assault.

== Home release ==
Xenon Entertainment released Sexo y otros secretos Primera Temporada on October 14, 2008. The second season has not been released.

== Awards and nominations ==
Year	Award	Category	Nominated	Result
2008	TVyNovelas Awards	Best Series	S.O.S.: Sexo y otros secretos	Nominated
2009	TVyNovelas Awards	Best Series	S.O.S.: Sexo y otros secretos	Nominated
