= Una familia con Ángel =

- Genre: Sitcom
- Created by: Martin Cohan; Blake Hunter
- Directed by: varied
- Starring: Laura Luz; Daniel Martinez; Mariza Morgado; Isabella Flores; Erich Harrach
- Country of origin: Mexico
- Original language: Spanish
- No. of seasons: 1
- No. of episodes: 100

Production
- Executive producer: Alfredo de la Lama
- Production location: Mexico
- Running time: 30 minutes

Original release
- Network: TV Azteca
- Release: August 18, 1998 – 1999

Una Familia con Ángel is a TV show that ran for one year (1998–1999) on Azteca 13 in Mexico. It was produced by TV Azteca and Telemundo. The show was based on the American sitcom Who's the Boss?

== Characters ==
- Mariana Torres (played by Laura Luz) is a professional hard-working woman who is divorced and has one son, Adrián. She lives with her son and her mom in a very elegant zone of Mexico City. Mariana is a very important business woman but she has no time to take care of her son and her house.
- Ángel Leal (played by Daniel Martínez) is a humble man with one daughter, Paulina. Ángel's wife died six years ago and he's looking for a job to give a good life to her daughter, then he finds Mariana Torres and works with her as her butler.
- Mona Ríos (played by Maritza Morgado) is Mariana's mom, an open-minded woman who wants her daughter to start a new relationship with Ángel. She tries to create a romantic atmosphere between Ángel and Mariana during all the series.
- Paulina and Adrián (played by Isabella Flores and Erich Harrach) - Ángel's daughter and Mariana's son.

The series never had a last episode, the audience never knew if Mariana and Ángel really had a love relationship or not, because the show was canceled after the first year.

The show was a smash hit during the late 1990s and even in re-runs from 2000 to 2002. The series was shown starting in 1998 on Telemundo in the United States.
