= Quererte así =

Mexican telenovela

- Loving You Like This
- Genre: Comedy drama, Romance, Black humor
- Created by: Eric Vonn
- Developed by: Azteca; Azteca Novelas: Alberto Santini Lara; Elisa Salinas
- Directed by: Mauricio Meneses; Pablo Gómez-Saenz
- Starring: María José Magan; Francisco Angelini; Aura Cristina Geithner; Bernie Paz; Veronica Merchant; Gabriela Vergara; Mauricio Barcelata; Gloria Stalina
- Theme music composer: Jorge Avendaño Lührs
- Opening theme: "Quererte Así" by Erick Sandoval; Esmeralda Ugalde
- Country of origin: Mexico
- Original language: Spanish
- No. of episodes: 120 (list of episodes)

Production
- Executive producer: Rafael Uriostegui
- Producer: Ximena Cantuarias
- Production locations: Puerto Vallarta; Mexico City; Acapulco; Toluca; Cuernavaca
- Editors: Mónica Rodríguez Carrillo; Alejandra Espinoza; Rigel Sosa Andrade
- Camera setup: Multi-camera
- Running time: 36–43 minutes
- Production company: TV Azteca

Original release
- Network: Azteca Trece
- Release: 16 April – 3 August 2012

Related
- Huérfanas; Destino

Quererte así (Loving You Like This) is a Mexican telenovela produced by Eric Vonn for Azteca. Filming lasted from 30 January 2012 to 15 June 2012. During the week of 16 April, TV Azteca broadcast Quererte Así weeknights at 7:30pm. From 23 April to 25 May, TV Azteca moved the telenovela from 7:30pm to 6pm. From 28 May – 3 August 2012, it was moved again from 6pm to 4pm.

On 27 July, TV Azteca announced that broadcasts of Quererte así would end on 3 August 2012, due to low ratings, with Corazón apasionado replacing it. As a result, only 80 episodes were broadcast on Azteca out of the 120 episodes that were filmed. Telenovela is normally sold internationally with 120 episodes.

== Cast ==
| Actor | Character | Known as |
|---|---|---|
| María José Magan | Paulina Navarette Duncan | Emilia's and Amilcar's daughter, Gustavo's stepdaughter, in love with Rafael, Silvia's best friend |
| Francisco Angelini | Rafael Romero | Doctor degree graduate, in love with Paulina, Gil's best friend, Fred's godson |
| Bernie Paz | Gustavo Navarette | Emilia's husband, Gabriela's father, Paulina's stepfather, Matías' best friend |
| Aura Cristina Geithner | Emilia Duncan de Navarrete | Antonio's daughter, Gustavo's wife, Paulina's mother, Gabriela's stepmother, José María's friend and chef |
| Gabriela Vergara | Marisela Santos / Isadora Morales | Matías' wife, Alberto's and Cristina's mother, Emilia's friend |
| Fernando Luján | Alfred "Fred" Parker Morisson | Rafael's godfather, Ramón's and Eva's friend |
| Verónica Merchant | Carmela Ramírez | Genaro's and Perla's mother, Esther's sister, Silvia's and Daniel's aunt, Amilcar's ex-wife |
| Fernando Becerril | Ramón Romero | Eva's husband, Rafael's father |
| Mauricio Barcelata | Alberto Santos | Matías' and Marisela's son, Cristina's brother, Paulina's fiance, Diego's best friend and boss |
| María Fernanda Quiroz | Gabriela Navarette | Gustavo's daughter, Emilia's stepdaughter, Paulina's half sister, Magali's best friend |
| Wendy de los Cobos | Yolanda García | Rafael's and Gil's housekeeper and friend |
| Tómas Goros | Amílcar Ramírez | Ex-driver of Duncan family, Emilia's first love, Paulina's father, Carmela's ex-husband, Genaro's and Perla's father |
| Rodolfo Arías | Matías Santos | Marisela's husband, Alberto's and Cristina's father, Gustavo's friend |
| Fabian Corres | Javier Valdés | Julián's father, Magali's uncle, falls in love with Silvia |
| Guillermo Larrea | José María Ordóñez | Emilia's best friend from childhood, right hand in her business |
| Eva Prado | Eva Cruz | Ramón's wife, Rafael's mother |
| Surya Macgregor | Esther Andrade | Silvia and Daniela's mother, Carmela's sister, Perla and Genaro's aunt |
| Cinthia Vazquez | Silvia Andrade | Esther's daughter, Daniel's sister, Carmela's niece, Perla's and Genaro's cousin, Paulina's best friend |
| María de la Fuente | Perla Ramírez | Carmela's daughter, Genaro's sister, Silvia's and Daniel's cousin, Matías' lover |
| Gloria Stalina | Adalina Rivas Meléndez | Works in Eva's and Ramon's restaurant, knows Rafael since childhood |
| Sylvia Sàenz | Magali Valdés | Javier's niece, Julián's cousin, Gabriela's best friend, Diego's girlfriend |
| Germán Valdes | Daniel Andrade | Esther's son, Silvia's brother, Perla's and Genaro's cousin, Carmela's niece, love affair with Cristina |
| Giovanni Florido | Genaro Ramírez | Carmela's son, Perla's brother, Silvia's and Daniel's cousin |
| Rykardo Hernández | Diego Aguirre | Alberto's best friend and co-worker, Magali's boyfriend |
| Roberta Burns | Cristina Santos | Matías' and Marisela's daughter, Alberto's sister, Bibi's best friend |
| Ivonne Zurita | Bibi | Cristina's best friend, Mauro's girlfriend |
| Luis Santibañez | Gil Contreras | Box player, Rafael's best friend |
| Dadvian Esparza | Mauro | Julián's best friend, interests in Bibi |
| Luciano Zacharski | Julián Valdés | Javier's son, Magali's cousin, Mauro's friend, addicted to Gym and Anabolics |
| Ana Ofelia Murguía | Yuridia "Yuya" Domínguez | Paulina's nanny from childhood |
| Juan Carlos Martín del Campo | Boris | Fred's personal assistant |
| Juan Pablo Campa | Damián | Likes Paulina |

== Production ==
- Eric Vonn was contracted by Azteca for two new novelas, he wrote first 20 episodes of Quererte así before Azteca decided to film Cielo rojo at first, so he stopped writing this telenovela and started to write Cielo rojo quickly, after finishing it on 17 November 2011, he continued writing "Quererte Así" and concluded writing on 31 May 2012 with 120 episodes as was planned.
- All the crew and staff of Cielo rojo also worked on this telenovela.
- From 11 to 25 January, producers Ximena Cantuarias and Rafael Uriostegui were busy in casting.
- As of 26 January 2012 promos and trailers were filmed.
- Opening sequence was directed by Kiko Guerrero and Carlos Somonte and filmed on 27 January 2012.
- First promo aired on 4 February 2012.
