= ¡Qué chulada! (TV program) =

Mexican talk show

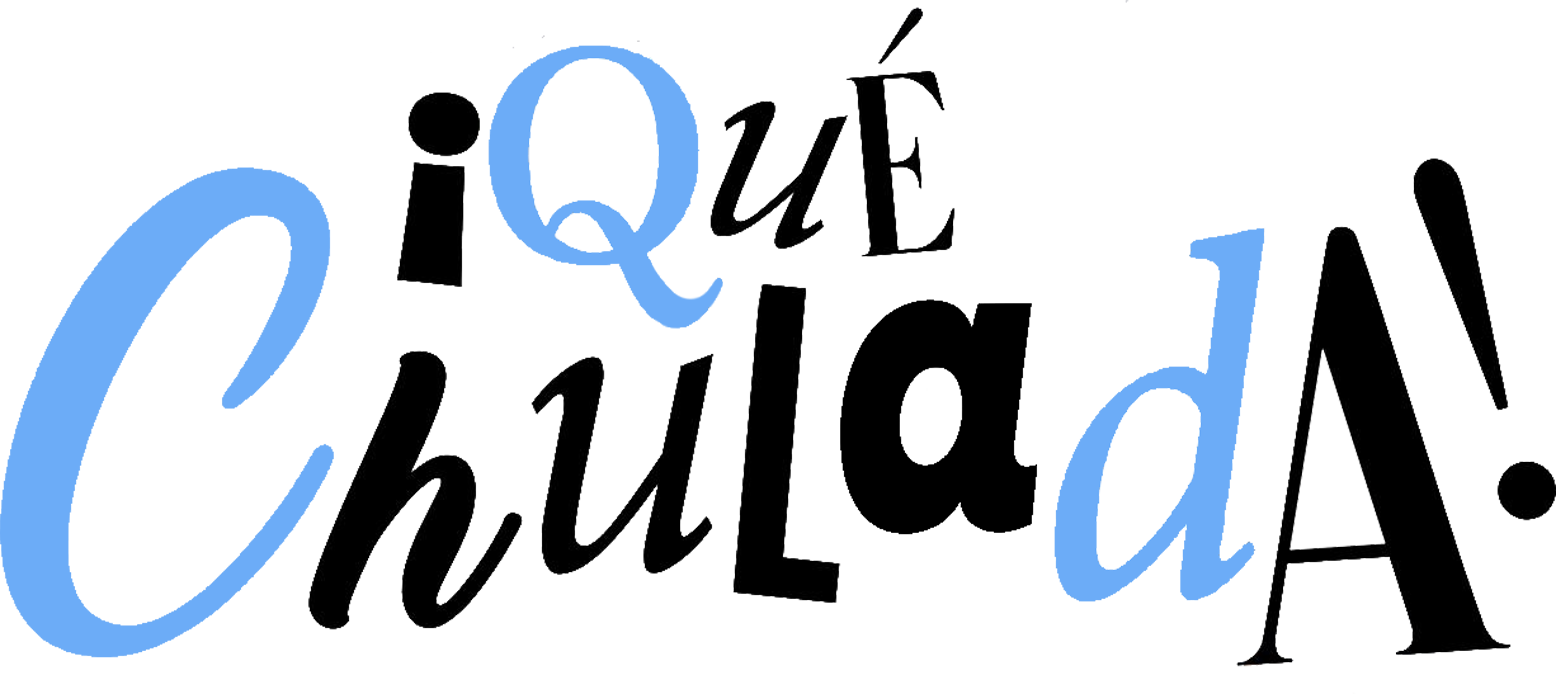
- Genre: Talk Show
- Presented by: Verónica Toussaint; Mariana H Annie Barrios

Production
- Producers: Mónica Alcaraz (2020–present); David Ortiz Marquet (2020–present)
- Production locations: Mexico City, Mexico (2020–present)
- Camera setup: Multi-camera
- Running time: 60-90 minutes (including commercials)
- Production company: Grupo Imagen

Original release
- Network: Imagen Televisión
- Release: February 24, 2020 – present

¡Qué Chulada! is a Mexican talk show produced and broadcast by Imagen Televisión. It is a space for conversation on current issues of general interest, where women can raise their voices, offer their point of view and set their own style to question, reflect, entertain and share with the audience.

It is broadcast live from the studios of Ciudad Imagen on Av. Copilco, Coyoacán in Mexico City, Mexico. It premiered on February 24, 2020, and is hosted by Verónica Toussaint, Marta Guzmán (salio), Mariana H and Annie Barrios, with Luz María Zetina (salio), Mónica Noguera and Paulina Mercado (salio). It currently airs Monday through Friday from 12:30 p.m. to 14:00 p.m (UTC).

== Presenters ==
=== Hosting ===
- Verónica Toussaint (2020–present)
- Mariana H(2020–present)
- Annie Barrios (2021–present)

Colaboradores

- Mónica Noguera (2020–present)
- Marlene Stahl (2021–Present)
- Lalo Carrillo (2020–present)

== Segments ==
- Ya en serio: In this section the hosts will touch on various topics of depth.
- Preguntas con huevos: Several questions found inside egg-shaped containers will be answered.
- Yo nunca, nunca: The hosts will tell the truth about what they have experienced, or not, to seek empathy with the audience.
- Con sentido: It is an interview section, based on the parts of the human body.
- El clóset: Intimate confessions are made in order to bring out fears and confront them with the viewers.
