= Paradas continuas =

- theatrical poster
- Directed by: Gustavo Loza
- Written by: Gustavo Loza
- Based on: "Rapiditos Motorizados" by Juan Meyer
- Produced by: Gloria Calzada
- Starring: Germán Valdés III; Luis Arrieta; Cassandra Ciangherotti
- Cinematography: Jerónimo Denti
- Edited by: Camilo Abadía
- Music by: Federico Bonasso
- Release date: 16 October 2009
- Running time: 110 minutes
- Country: Mexico
- Language: Spanish

Paradas continuas (literally "Stop and Go") is a 2009 Mexican comedy film directed by Gustavo Loza and Germán Valdés III, Luis Arrieta and Cassandra Ciangherotti. The film is based on "Rapiditos Motorizados", an original story by Juan Meyer. The screenplay is by Meyer, adapted by Loza.

== Plot ==
Perico and Emilio are two students who have nowhere to have sex with their girlfriends. They cannot take them home, and do not want to go to a hotel, so they use Perico's father's cherished VW microbus after making some changes to it. They then decide to go into business with the van.

== Cast ==
- Germán Valdés III as Perico
- Luis Arrieta as Emilio
- Cassandra Ciangherotti as Lisa
- Ana Karina Sanchez as Federica
- Jimena Guerra as Karina
- Ilithya Manzanilla as Dara
- Alejandro Calva as Master Carranco
- Tia Regina Orozco as Roz
- Silverio Palacios as Cachacuaz
- Luz María Zetina as Luisa
- Javier Gurruchaga as Teacher Goicoechea
- Daniel Martinez as Perico Dad
- Oswaldo Zarate as Ramiro
- Alejandro de la Vega as Tino
- Damayanti Quintanar as Sasha
- Anhuar Escalante as Dino
- Sergio Ochoa as Rogelio
- Wanda Seux as Wanda

== Soundtrack ==
- "Yofo" - Molotov
- "Encuerado" - Babasónicos
- "Amar y vivir" - Tonino Carotone
- "Mil Demonios" - Moderatto
- "Susie Q" - Orquesta Mondragón
- "Funkytown" - Lipps Inc.
- "Chambacu" - Aurita Castillo y su conjunto
- "Monitor" - Volován featuring Ximena Sariñana
- "Sufro por ti" - Los Gatos
- "Lolita" - Orquesta Mondragón
- "Compagnon Du Ciel" - Adanowsky and Arthur H
- "Cantando en el baño" - Germán Valdés "Tin Tan"
- "Quizás, Quizás, Quizás" - Sarita Montiel
- "Memories Through Your Eyes" - Los Charlone Y Juan Adolfo Moreno
- "Tu amor mata" - Juguete Rabioso
- "Bang" - Veo Muertos featuring Diego Maroto
- "Se Me Perdió La Cadenita" - La Sonora Dinamita
- "Sin Amigos" - Los Mentas
- "Sastre del Diablo" - Babasónicos
