= List of Quererte Así episodes =

Quererte Así (Loving You Like This) is a Mexican telenovela produced by Eric Vonn for Azteca. Filming lasted from 30 January 2012 to 15 June 2012. During the week of 16 April, TV Azteca broadcast Quererte Así weeknights at 7:30pm. From 23 April to 25 May, TV Azteca moved the telenovela from 7:30pm to 6pm. From 28 May – 3 August 2012, it was moved again from 6pm to 4pm.

== Episodes ==
Air Date	Number	Episode Title	Rating	Duration
April 16, 2012	001	Gran Estreno	7.5	66 minutes
April 17, 2012	002	Paulina conocerá a Rafael en playa Paraíso	7.1	53 minutes
April 18, 2012	003	Emilia quiere apoderarse de la herencia de Paulina	7.5	52 minutes
April 19, 2012	004	Paulina suspenderá su boda	6.2	46 minutes
April 20, 2012	005	Paulina no firmará para darle su herencia a Emilia	6.4	42 minutes
April 23, 2012	006	Paulina dejará plantado en el altar a Alberto	8.0	41 minutes
April 24, 2012	007	Alberto estará celoso de saber que Paulina se enamoró de Rafael	5.8	41 minutes
April 25, 2012	008	Rafael llegará a la Iglesia para impedir la boda de Paulina	6.1	43 minutes
April 26, 2012	009	Rafael conocerá a Emilia, ¿Qué pasará?	6.1	41 minutes
April 27, 2012	010	Rafael llamará ogro a Emilia y ella le contestará el teléfono	5.6	42 minutes
April 30, 2012	011	Emilia le ofrecerá una vida cómoda a Rafael si no se lleva a Paulina	N/A	41 minutes
May 1, 2012	012	Emilia estará dispuesta hasta a matar a Rafael	5.5	43 minutes
May 2, 2012	013	Adalina sorprenderá a Rafael	5.3	42 minutes
May 3, 2012	014	Emilia le confesará a Rafael sobre la herencia que recibirá Paulina al casarse	5.9	41 minutes
May 4, 2012	015	Alberto grabará a Gabriela en una situación incómoda	5.4	43 minutes
May 7, 2012	016	Gabriela se dará cuenta que Alberto la grabó mientras tenían relaciones	6.0	40 minutes
May 8, 2012	017	Paulina se fuga a Acapulco	5.9	40 minutes
May 9, 2012	018	Rafael tuvo que explicarle a Paulina el por qué Emilia tiene su teléfono	5.7	42 minutes
May 10, 2012	019	Eva amueblará el departamento de Paulina y Rafael	5.4	43 minutes
May 11, 2012	020	¿Paulina dejará a Rafael por vivir en la pobreza?	5.4	43 minutes
May 14, 2012	021	Emilia llega al departamento de Rafa y Paulina	5.8	43 minutes
May 15, 2012	022	Perla intenta seducir a Matías	6.7	42 minutes
May 16, 2012	023	Emilia no pudo ocultar el horror que siente por la familia de Rafa	6.2	42 minutes
May 17, 2012	024	Yolanda le pregunta a Paulina cómo es Gabriela	6.5	43 minutes
May 18, 2012	025	Carmela está desconsolada igual que Silvia y Daniel por la muerte de Esther	5.1	42 minutes
May 21, 2012	026	Fred le dice a Rafa que es su verdadero padre y no sabe cómo reaccionar ante la noticia	6.1	41 minutes
May 22, 2012	027	Paulina y Rafael tienen su primera pelea por dinero	5.9	41 minutes
May 23, 2012	028	Emilia y Amilcar volverán a vivir su amor de adolescentes	5.8	40 minutes
May 24, 2012	029	Paulina se encuentra con su verdadero padre Amilcar	5.8	41 minutes
May 25, 2012	030	Gabriela descubrirá quién es su verdadera madre	5.9	43 minutes
May 28, 2012	031	Amilcar no irá a la boda de Paulina	3.7	40 minutes
May 29, 2012	032	Yolanda no podrá enfrentar a Gabriela para decirle la verdad	3.7	40 minutes
May 30, 2012	033	El secreto de Eva será descubierto por Adalina	3.9	43 minutes
May 31, 2012	034	Eva no quiere que Ramón se entere de su infidelidad	4.2	41 minutes
June 1, 2012	035	Paulina le dará la mitad de su herencia a Gaby a pesar de que Emilia no quiera	3.4	42 minutes
June 4, 2012	036	Eva pelea a golpes con Adalina por pedirle dinero para guardar su secreto	3.4	42 minutes
June 5, 2012	037	Fred promete guardar el secreto de Eva pase lo que pase	3.9	41 minutes
June 6, 2012	038	Rafael vuelve a discutir con Paulina por dinero	4.5	40 minutes
June 7, 2012	039	Adalina le dice la verdad a Ramón sobre Rafael	4.0	40 minutes
June 8, 2012	040	Eva le pide perdón a Ramón por su infidelidad	4.8	40 minutes
June 11, 2012	041	Eva sufre un accidente al ir caminando en la calle	3.9	40 minutes
June 12, 2012	042	Ramón no puede soportar la idea de que Eva haya muerto	4.7	40 minutes
June 13, 2012	043	Paulina no soporta que Rafael le reclame por haber pagado el velorio de mamá Eva	5.2	40 minutes
June 14, 2012	044	Cristina y Daniel se extrañan a pesar de el daño que les hizo Genaro con el video	4.2	40 minutes
June 15, 2012	045	Gabriela le dice a Gustavo que no debe afectarle que Emilia esté con Amilcar	3.9	39 minutes
June 18, 2012	046	Perla le dice a Gustavo que está embarazada de Matías	4.0	40 minutes
June 19, 2012	047	Paulina no le dará un sólo centavo a Gabriela	4.6	40 minutes
June 20, 2012	048	¿Qué intenta Emilia al besar a Fred?	4.2	40 minutes
June 21, 2012	049	Silvia le cuenta a Paulina que Amilcar violó a Perla	4.2	40 minutes
June 22, 2012	050	Perla le confiesa toda la verdad a Paulina sobre Beto	3.7	40 minutes
June 25, 2012	051	Marisela le confiesa su interés por Gustavo a Emilia	4.0	39 minutes
June 26, 2012	052	Adalina rechaza a Amilcar cuando él le pide perdón	3.7	40 minutes
June 27, 2012	053	Gustavo ya no siente celos de Amilcar	3.9	39 minutes
June 28, 2012	054	Ramón le pide a Rafa que acepte la ayuda de Fred	4.0	40 minutes
June 29, 2012	055	Magali descubre a su primo bailando en un centro nocturno con poca ropa	2.9	40 minutes
July 2, 2012	056	¿Emilia planea quitarle todo a Fred?	4.5	40 minutes
July 3, 2012	057	Matías cae en la trampa de Alberto	3.9	38 minutes
July 4, 2012	058	Emilia pelea a golpes con Gabriela	4.0	38 minutes
July 5, 2012	059	Emilia quiere a toda costa el dinero de Fred	3.7	39 minutes
July 6, 2012	060	Matías manda a volar a Beto	3.7	39 minutes
July 9, 2012	061	Genaro amenazó a Alberto y le pidió dinero	3.2	40 minutes
July 10, 2012	062	Cristina le confiesa a su mamá que Genaro la amenaza con un video comprometedor	N/A	40 minutes
July 11, 2012	063	Rafael le pide muchas explicaciones a Fred sobre su relación con Emilia	3.9	39 minutes
July 12, 2012	064	Rafael acepta la amistad de Fred	3.7	37 minutes
July 13, 2012	065	Fred y Emilia planean la boda	N/A	36 minutes
July 16, 2012	066	Alberto le dirá a Matías que el hijo de Perla es de él	3.6	37 minutes
July 17, 2012	067	Perla le cuenta a Paulina todo sobre su relación con Alberto y Matías	4.4	37 minutes
July 18, 2012	068	Emilia está dispuesta a todo por el dinero de Rafael	4.4	38 minutes
July 19, 2012	069	Fred está muerto y Emilia planea quitarle todo a Rafael	4.1	38 minutes
July 20, 2012	070	Emilia corre a Gabriela del hotel	4.0	37 minutes
July 23, 2012	071	Emilia quiere que Rafael le pida perdón para ayudarle a ir al extranjero	3.7	38 minutes
July 24, 2012	072	Carmela está desesperada por el hijo que va a tener	4.0	38 minutes
July 25, 2012	073	Rafael puede perder para siempre a Paulina por su orgullo	3.4	36 minutes
July 26, 2012	074	Genaro intentó matar a Matías	3.4	37 minutes
July 27, 2012	075	Paulina rodó por las escaleras por culpa de Emilia	2.8	39 minutes
July 30, 2012	076	Paulina despertó del coma y no le perdonará a Rafael que la haya abandonado	3.0	39 minutes
July 31, 2012	077	Paulina y Rafel terminaron para siempre	3.9	39 minutes
August 1, 2012	078	Rafael no le niega a Paulina que buscará con quién consolarse	4.4	39 minutes
August 2, 2012	079	Rafael piensa hacerse un lado para que Paulina sea feliz	4.7	38 minutes
August 3, 2012	080	Capítulo Final Quererte asi	4.8	39 minutes
