= Luz María Zetina =

Mexican actress

- Born: Luz María Zetina Lugo; May 28, 1973 (age 51); Mexico City, Mexico
- Other names: Luzma
- Years active: 1994—present
- Title: Nuestra Belleza México 1994
- Spouse: Eduardo Clemesha
- Children: 3

Luz María Zetina (born Luz María Zetina Lugo on May 28, 1973 in Mexico City, Mexico) is a Mexican actress, model, tv host and beauty pageant titleholder who was crowned Miss Mexico 1994. She represented her country in the Miss Universe 1995 held in Windhoek, Namibia on May 12, 1995. She later studied acting at Televisa's Centro de Educación Artística. Her first role was in the telenovela Ángela. She currently hosts Sale el Sol, a morning show that airs on Mondays through Fridays on Imagen Televisión.

== Filmography ==
=== Film ===
Year	Title	Role
2003	Dame tu cuerpo	Jackie
2008	Paradas Contínuas	

=== Television ===
Year	Title	Role	Notes
1998	En Concreto	Herself	Host
1998-99	Ángela	Diana Gallardo Santillana	Supporting Role
1999	Rosalinda	Luz María	Supporting Role
1999-00	Cuento de Navidad		Miniseries
1999-00	Tres mujeres	Paloma	Supporting Role
2000	Locura de amor	Lorena	Special Appearance
2001	Diseñador ambos sexos	Carolina Carrera	
2005	Netas Divinas	Herself	Host
2006	Amor mío		Special Appearance
2007	Nuestra Belleza México 2007	Herself	Judge
2007-08	S.O.S.: Sexo y otros Secretos	Maggie	
2008	Kilómetros de Lucha	Herself	
2008	Viva la mañana	Herself	Host
2011	Los 15 que soñe	Herself	Judge
2011	Miembros al Aire	Herself	Guest
2011	Al Sabor del Chef	Herself	Guest
2013-14	Por Siempre Mi Amor	Eugenia Arenas de de la Riva	Special Appearance
2016–present	Sale el Sol	Herself	Host
2020–present	¡Qué Chulada!	Herself	Host

=== Theatre ===
- 2001 – Cómo defraudar al Gobierno
- 2008 – Chicas católicas

== Awards and nominations ==
Year	Award	Category	Result
2001	Premio Bravo	Actress Revelation in Comedy Program	Won
2004	Diosas de Plata	Female Revelation	Nominated

Awards and achievements
Preceded by None	Nuestra Belleza Estado de México; 1994	Succeeded by María Guadalupe Flores
Preceded by None	Nuestra Belleza México; 1994	Succeeded by Vanessa Guzmán
Preceded by Dafne Molina	Corona al Mérito; 2007	Succeeded by Priscila Perales
