= Laura Luz =

Mexican stage and television actress (born 1967)

- Born: Laura María de la Luz Fernández Jiménez; May 10, 1967 (age 59); Mexico City, Mexico
- Occupations: stage and television actress

Laura Luz (born Laura María de la Luz Fernández Jiménez; May 10, 1967) is a Mexican stage and television actress, born in Mexico City.

== Life ==
She first appeared on stage at the age of 11 and her first professional work was in 1983 in the play Las Leandras.

Luz has performed in numerous plays, running from comedy to drama, and including musicals.

On television, she has performed in:

- Cachún cachún ra ra (1984–1987) playing Olimpia.
- Milagro y magia (Miracle and Magic, telenovela, 1991)
- Buscando el paraíso (Looking for Paradise, telenovela 1994)

In 1998 she was the principal actress of the Mexican situation comedy Una familia con Ángel, and in 2000 she participated in the soap opera Todo por amor; also in 2000, she debuted as hostess of the morning program Cada Mañana (Every Morning), until she left the show for personal reasons in November 2003.

In 2001 Luz got a very strange illness in her lungs that almost killed her. That is why she created the musical "Muerte con M de Mujer" which she presents each November as a tribute to the death.

Since 2005, she's been the central figure of the radio/television program Falda y pantalón (Skirt and Pants) for the channel Radio-Telefórmula.
