= Imagen Televisión =

Mexican national TV network

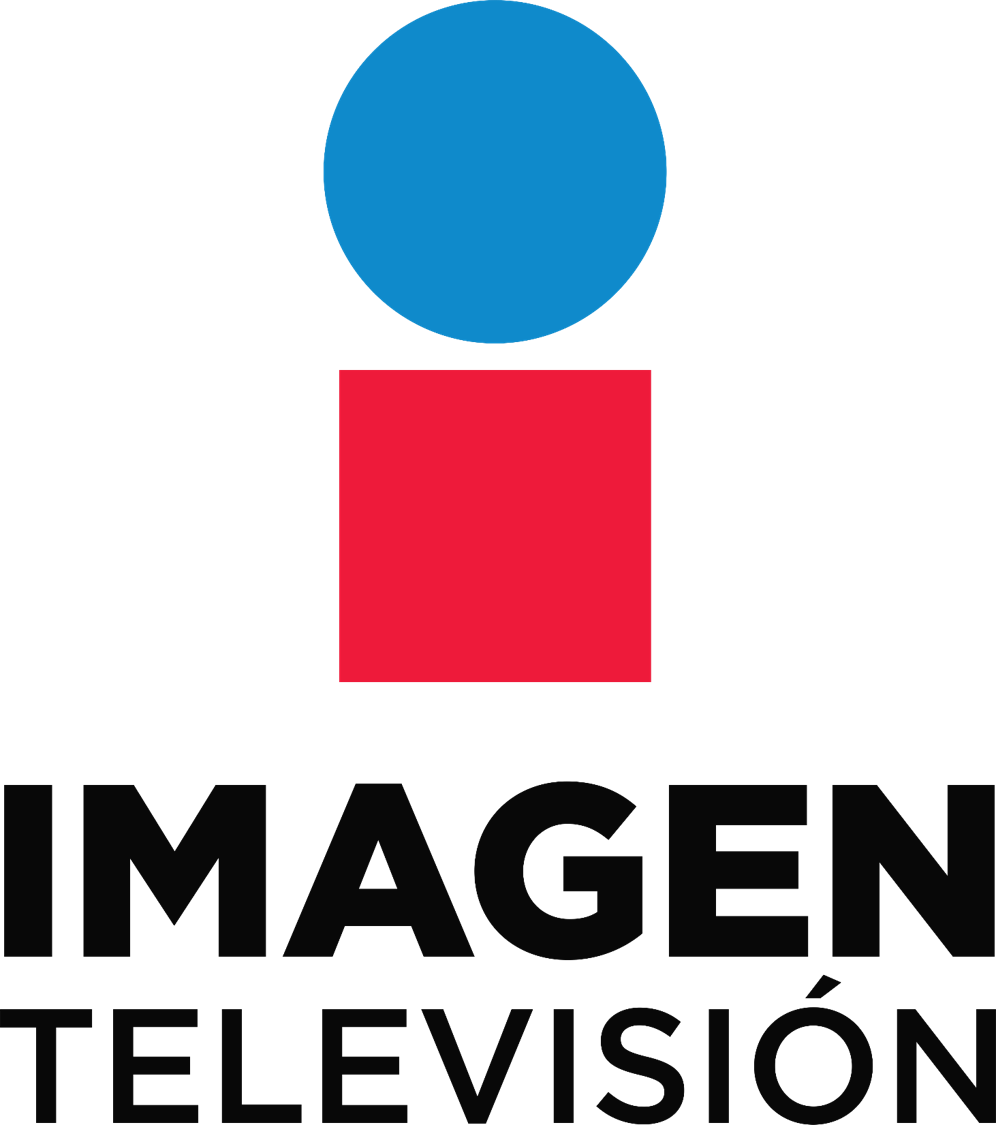
- Type: Free-to-air television network
- Country: Mexico
- Transmitters: see below
- Headquarters: Mexico City

Programming
- Picture format: 1080i HDTV

Ownership
- Owner: Cadena Tres I, S.A. de C.V.
- Parent: Grupo Imagen

History
- Founded: 2015
- Launched: October 17, 2016
- Founder: Grupo Imagen

Links
- Website: imagentv.com

Availability

Terrestrial
- Digital terrestrial television (except Reynosa and Agua Prieta): Channel 3.1
- Digital terrestrial television (Agua Prieta): Channel 10.1
- Digital terrestrial television (Reynosa): Channel 13.1

Imagen Televisión is a national broadcast television network in Mexico, owned by Grupo Imagen. It launched on October 17, 2016, at 8 p.m.

== History ==
=== Imagen on television ===
In 2006, Imagen's parent, Grupo Empresarial Ángeles, acquired XHRAE-TV channel 28 in Mexico City from its previous owner, beleaguered businessman Raúl Aréchiga Espinoza, for US$126 million. Imagen already owned radio stations in Mexico City and other major cities nationwide. The next year, GEA relaunched the station as "cadenatres", with the ambition of functioning as Mexico's third broadcast network. Despite this and national basic cable carriage, cadenatres only had a handful of local affiliates. On October 26, 2015, cadenatres was shuttered and replaced with news outlet Excélsior TV as Imagen began preparing to launch its national network.

=== A new national network ===
In 2014, the Federal Telecommunications Institute began a bidding process to make available packages of new national television networks. Two packages were available, each containing 123 transmitters. Three bidders continued to the final round: Grupo Imagen, under the name Cadena Tres I, S.A. de C.V.; Grupo Radio Centro; and Organización Editorial Mexicana (Centro de Información Nacional de Estudios Tepeyac, S.A. de C.V.), which operates the ABC Radio network. OEM dropped out unexpectedly just days before the death of its CEO, Mario Vázquez Raña, paving the way for Cadena Tres I and GRC to be declared the winning bidders on March 11, 2015. Imagen paid 1.808 billion pesos for the concession. Radio Centro, whose bid was significantly higher, subsequently ran into financial problems and dropped out, paying only the security deposit; thus, Imagen would be the only new national network created as the result of the bidding process.

The concessions held by Imagen bind them to two coverage clauses; they must serve 30 percent of the population in each of the 32 Mexican federative entities by March 2018, and within five years of the concession award, all 123 transmitters must be on air. Imagen's CEO, Olegario Vázquez Aldir, also announced a planned investment of 10 billion pesos to build out the network over 36 to 40 months. Some of this investment went into building Ciudad Imagen (Imagen City), a new facility in the Copilco neighborhood of Mexico City with 46,000 square metres (500,000 ft^{2}) of floor space, five studios for entertainment programs, a sixth for news, and three radio studios.

In October 2015, Imagen was approved to relocate all stations planned to be built above channel 36, in order to facilitate the repacking of television spectrum. Several other transmitters changed allocated channels as a result.

The first of the launch transmitters to come to air was the Mexico City station, XHCTMX-TDT, which signed on with color bars on August 19, 2016. In late September, the launch date was announced as Monday, October 17, and Imagen unveiled a new corporate logo designed by Chermayeff & Geismar & Haviv, a New York-based graphic design firm, which will also serve as the network's logo. In addition, the name of the network, Imagen Televisión, was formally announced, along with the initial slogan Juntos Somos Libres; Vázquez Aldir cited the desire to not merely be "the third network" and to have a more forward-looking moniker as reasons to bypass the Cadena Tres name. The launch makes Imagen the first new national commercial network to begin operations in Mexico since the privatization of Imevisión and resultant creation of Televisión Azteca in 1993.

== Programming ==
Vázquez Aldir described Imagen's programming approach as "a family channel, with a focus on women".

=== General entertainment ===
Imagen's first two original telenovelas, produced in collaboration with Argos Comunicación and Estudios TeleMéxico, were Vuelve temprano and Perseguidos. The latter was originally known as El Capo (The Drug Lord) but was changed, potentially to prevent a reclassification of the program that would have required it to air after midnight. The network also picked up Brazilian, Colombian and Turkish dramas.

=== News ===
Imagen Televisión features three weekday and one Sunday night newscasts. Ciro Gómez Leyva, who hosts a Radio Fórmula morning show and formerly worked for Televisa and CNI Canal 40, hosted the network's flagship late news until 2024, when he was replaced by Nacho Lozano. Francisco Zea hosts the network's morning show, while Crystal Mendívil hosts the afternoon newscast at 2pm replacing Yuriria Sierra. The Sunday night edition is anchored by Enrique Sánchez.

The network also has a three-hour morning magazine program, Sale el Sol, hosted by Luz María Zetina, Mauricio Barcelata, Carlos Arenas and Paulina Mercado. It also has the two-hour entertainment news program, De Primera Mano, hosted by Gustavo Adolfo Infante, Mónica Noguera and Michelle Ruvalcaba, launched on July 24, 2017. On February 24, 2020, the program, ¡Qué Chulada!, began to air and was hosted by Veronica Toussaint, Marta Guzmán and Mariana H, with Luz María Zetina, Mónica Noguera and Paulina Mercado as co-hosts, being one of the main programs of Imagen Televisión until its cancellation in 2024.

=== Sports ===
Javier Alarcón was brought in to head Imagen's sports division and was among the first major hires for the network.

In 2023, the network acquired exclusive broadcasting rights for the 2023 World Baseball Classic and Major League Baseball, replacing TUDN on the latter. Until 2025, when TUDN retook the broadcasting rights for the 2026 World Baseball Classic and the MLB for a three-season span. Imagen currently airs the 2026 Mexican Baseball League season. With two weekly games

Imagen Televisión currently holds the rights to the Leagues Cup, the MLS All Star Game and the Campeones Cup,

Previously, the network held the rights to broadcast two Liga MX soccer clubs, its co-owned Querétaro FC (until 2020) and Jaguares de Chiapas (which would disappear after the 2017 season), though it subleased much of those rights to SKY México as the network was not on air. Both clubs' home matches will generally air on Saturdays at 5pm. The first soccer match to air on Imagen was a Querétaro fixture against Club América on October 22. For the Clausura 2017 tournament, Imagen carried Club León and C.F. Pachuca fixtures as well.

One regular sports program airs on Imagen, a Sunday night discussion program titled Adrenalina.

In June 2018, Imagen aired a one-hour version of WWE Raw and SmackDown every Saturday afternoon.

=== Children's ===
Imagen's children's programming block consists of a mix of classic series (Maya the Honey Bee, Marco and The Swiss Family Robinson: Flone of the Mysterious Island) and newer programs (formerly Pokémon). This also formerly included programming from Nickelodeon, thus making Imagen the second station to currently air Nick shows in Mexico aside from Canal 5.

=== Local programming ===
Currently, only Puebla provides local programming on Imagen Televisión. Imagen TV Puebla launched in January 2018, utilizing the resources of AS Media, which had previously produced TV Azteca Puebla local programs.

== Transmitters ==
Imagen Televisión, through Cadena Tres I, S.A. de C.V., is currently authorized to operate 49 main stations and 14 repeaters; in 2018, its transmitters covered 61.72 percent of the population in parts of all Mexican states. 38 transmitters were on air at launch, while 42 currently operate. The transmitters launched on air are primarily in state capitals, densely populated cities, and those that contribute most to the national gross domestic product. The transmitter network has primarily been deployed using preexisting public and commercial infrastructure, notably including towers owned by the Sistema Público de Radiodifusión del Estado Mexicano (SPR), Canal Once, MVS Radio, and several of Imagen's own radio stations. Each callsign represents the primary city listed in the IFT-defined coverage areas, though in several cases, Imagen built the transmitter in another, larger city within the coverage area—sometimes in another state.

On July 4, 2018, the IFT awarded Imagen TV an 18-month extension of its national coverage obligations. Imagen cited crime problems, negotiations with landowners and municipal permitting processes as factors necessitating the extension. A further extension to the five-year deadline to build out the network was granted in February 2020.

Almost all stations have been allotted virtual channel 3, except for two stations on the border region with the United States: XHCTRM-TDT, Reynosa and Matamoros, Tamps., which is assigned virtual channel 13 due to a potential conflict with KIII in Corpus Christi, Texas, and XHCTAP-TDT, Agua Prieta and Cananea, Son., which is assigned virtual channel 10 due to a conflict with KFTU-DT in Douglas, Arizona. Both US stations use virtual channel 3.

All transmitters carry Excélsior TV, Imagen's cable news channel, as subchannel 3.4. Until 2020, this did not include the Mexico City transmitter, as Excélsior was available over the air on XHTRES-TDT. Additional transmitters were added for Excélsior TV in December 2017.

The Chihuahua transmitters had been authorized in June 2018 to carry Canal 16, a television channel to be operated by the Chihuahua state government, as subchannel 3.3; after a delay, this service never began operations.

RF	VC	Call sign	Location	ERP
18	3	XHCTAG-TDT	Aguascalientes, Ags. Nochistlán de Mejía, Zac.	100 kW; 4 kW
24	3	XHCTEN-TDT	Ensenada, B.C.	20 kW
17	3	XHCTME-TDT	Mexicali, B.C.	150 kW
33	3	XHCTTI-TDT	Tijuana, B.C.	132.148 kW
28	3	XHCTGN-TDT	Guerrero Negro, B.C.S.	1 kW
22	3	XHCTLP-TDT	La Paz, B.C.S.	100 kW
31	3	XHCTLO-TDT	Loreto, B.C.S.	2 kW
21	3	XHCTSJ-TDT	San José del Cabo, B.C.S.	2 kW
25	3	XHCTSR-TDT	Santa Rosalía, B.C.S.	0.580 kW
20	3	XHCTCA-TDT	Campeche, Camp. Champotón, Camp.	50 kW; 6 kW
24	3	XHCTAR-TDT	Arriaga, Chis.	2.7 kW
27	3	XHCTCD-TDT	Comitán de Domínguez, Chis.	4 kW
29	3	XHCTPQ-TDT	Palenque, Chis.	4 kW
29	3	XHCTTH-TDT	Tapachula, Chis.	54.192 kW
27	3	XHCTCR-TDT	Tuxtla Gutiérrez, Chis. San Cristóbal de las Casas	40 kW; 10 kW
27	3	XHCTCG-TDT	Camargo, Chih.	5 kW
29	3	XHCTCH-TDT	Chihuahua, Chih. Ciudad Delicias, Chih.	52.761 kW; 10 kW
31	3	XHCTCJ-TDT	Ciudad Juárez, Chih.	150 kW
21	3	XHCTEE-TDT	Creel, Chih.	0.7206 kW
29	3	XHCTMX-TDT	Mexico City; Tultepec, Mex.	295.411 kW; 3 kW
26	3	XHCTSA-TDT	Saltillo, Coah.	50 kW
24	3	XHCTTR-TDT	Torreón, Coah.	160 kW
27	3	XHCTCO-TDT	Colima, Col. Tecomán	50 kW; 20 kW
27	3	XHCTCE-TDT	Cuencamé, Dgo.	1 kW
24	3	XHCTDG-TDT	Durango, Dgo.	37.485 kW
26	3	XHCTLE-TDT	León, Gto.	10 kW
21	3	XHCTAC-TDT	Acapulco, Gro.	30 kW
25	3	XHCTCP-TDT	Chilpancingo, Gro.	20 kW
16	3	XHCTIX-TDT	Ixmiquilpan-Pachuca, Hgo. Tula de Allende, Hgo.	20 kW; 35 kW
28	3	XHCTAN-TDT	Autlán de Navarro, Jal.	0.230 kW
28	3	XHCTGD-TDT	Guadalajara, Jal.	100 kW
29	3	XHCTPV-TDT	Puerto Vallarta, Jal.	2.277 kW
14	3	XHCTTO-TDT	Toluca, Mex.	26.261 kW
34	3	XHCTMO-TDT	Morelia, Mich. Pátzcuaro, Mich.	50 kW; 5 kW
36	3	XHCTUR-TDT	Uruapan, Mich.	0.5 kW
28	3	XHCTZI-TDT	Zitácuaro, Mich.	2 kW
23	3	XHCTCU-TDT	Cuernavaca, Mor.	80 kW
21	3	XHCTAT-TDT	Acaponeta–Tecuala, Nay.	5 kW
22	3	XHCTNY-TDT	Tepic, Nay.	20 kW
22	3	XHCTMY-TDT	Monterrey, N.L. Montemorelos, N.L.	130 kW; 10 kW
36	3	XHCTSH-TDT	Sabinas Hidalgo, N.L.	10 kW
16	3	XHCTOX-TDT	Oaxaca, Oax.	120 kW
28	3	XHCTHL-TDT	Huajuapan de León, Oax.	2 kW
21	3	XHCTPU-TDT	Puebla, Pue.	100 kW
17	3	XHCTTE-TDT	Tehuacán, Pue.	2.821 kW
15	3	XHCTCY-TDT	Celaya, Gto.-Querétaro, Qro.	150 kW
22	3	XHCTCN-TDT	Cancún, Q. Roo	60 kW
22	3	XHCTCL-TDT	Chetumal, Q. Roo	8.15 kW
33	3	XHCTSL-TDT	San Luis Potosí, S.L.P. Ríoverde, S.L.P.	29.743 kW; 4 kW
26	3	XHCTRV-TDT	Ríoverde, S.L.P.	4 kW
33	3	XHCTCI-TDT	Culiacán, Sin. Cosalá–San Ignacio, Sin.	100 kW; 2 kW
33	3	XHCTLM-TDT	Los Mochis, Sin. Guamúchil	50.496 kW; 4 kW
21	3	XHCTMZ-TDT	Mazatlán, Sin.	34.656 kW
26	10	XHCTAP-TDT	Agua Prieta, Son. Cananea, Son.	2.306 kW; 2.306 kW
24	3	XHCTOB-TDT	Ciudad Obregón, Son.	120 kW
28	3	XHCTHE-TDT	Hermosillo, Son.	100 kW
36	3	XHCTVL-TDT	Villahermosa, Tab.	100 kW
20	3	XHCTMN-TDT	Ciudad Mante, Tamps.	0.572 kW
20	3	XHCTVI-TDT	Ciudad Victoria, Tamps.	20.248 kW
35	3	XHCTNL-TDT	Nuevo Laredo, Tamps.	143.827 kW
22	13	XHCTRM-TDT	Reynosa, Tamps. Matamoros, Tamps.	145.552 kW; 30 kW
25	3	XHCTTA-TDT	Tampico, Tamps.	100 kW
25	3	XHCTCZ-TDT	Cerro Azul, Ver. Huejutla de Reyes, Hgo.	10 kW; 2 kW
16	3	XHCTLV-TDT	La Venta, Tab.-Coatzacoalcos, Ver.	80 kW
25	3	XHCTVE-TDT	Veracruz, Ver. Alvarado, Ver.	25 kW; 3 kW
20	3	XHCTJA-TDT	Xalapa, Ver.	20 kW
22	3	XHCTMD-TDT	Mérida, Yuc.	60 kW
27	3	XHCTZA-TDT	Zacatecas, Zac.	92.942 kW
