= Luz Blanchet =

Mexican television presenter

Luz Blanchet (born Luz Blanchet Enríquez de Rivera in Mexico City) is a Mexican TV host. She started her career on the network TeleHit. She also participated in the shows Cada Mañana and Con sello de mujer.

Luz has had long-term experience in the media in addition to her career as a graphic designer, studying at the Universidad Iberoamericana. This led to several recognitions as a designer, with an honourable mention during her professional career. Her work was displayed at the Franz Mayer Museum and published internationally in the book Lo Mejor del Diseño Gráfico de Latinoamérica y el Caribe (Translated: The Best of Latin American and Caribbean Graphic Design).

== Television career ==
She began her career as a TV host on Clásicos, broadcast by TeleHit, and later appeared in Nuevo día, Festival Acapulco. For eleven years, she hosted several shows such as Domingo azteca, Festival Viña del Mar, Fin de siglo, Unidos por la honestidad, Premios Principio, Semana de la Radio y Televisión; and later Con sello de mujer and Gente con chispa.

Later, she became the leader of the Cada mañana project, which she left on July 23, 2004.

In 2008, she was part of the show called Póker de reinas

She is now separated from her husband Pedro Eguia

Since 2011, she has hosted the Fox Life program Luz en casa in which she creates beautiful home decorations quickly and affordably.

She also shares her experiences through her talks, "Hablándole a la Pared" (Speaking to the Wall) and "Tres Luces con Madre".

As of 2018, she has been part of the weekly segment LÚZete on Programa HOY, a magazine-styled TV show on Televisa México.
