= Mauricio Barcelata =

Mexican actor and TV host

- Born: 5 January 1970 (age 56); Alvarado, Veracruz, Mexico
- Occupation: Television presenter
- Spouse: María José Suárez

Mauricio Barcelata Pinedo (born 5 January 1970 in Alvarado, Veracruz) is a Mexican actor and TV host. He currently hosts Sale el Sol, the morning show of Imagen Televisión.

== Biography ==
Barcelata started his professional career as member of a child pop band called "Cometa". He later appeared as an extra in the telenovela Agujetas de color de rosa (1994). In the early 2000s he hosted the afternoon show Vida TV.

After several feuds with Televisa's directives in January 2009 Barcelata left the network and moved to TV Azteca where he hosted Para todos and Venga la Alegría.

In 2016, he moved to upstart Imagen Televisión and became the host of its morning program, Sale el Sol.

== Career ==
=== As actor ===
- Plaza Sésamo
- Agujetas de color de rosa (1994)
- Mi querida Isabel (1996)
- Mujer, casos de la vida real (1996-2003)
- No tengo madre (1997)
- Mi generación (1997-1998)
- ¿Qué nos pasa? (1998)
- Soñadoras (1998)
- Cuentos para solitarios (1999)
- DKDA: Sueños de juventud (1999-2000)
- Primer amor... a mil por hora
- El juego de la vida
- Desde Gayola (2002)
- Mujer de Madera
- La fea más bella
- Muchachitas como tú
- Vecinos (2008)
- Mujeres asesinas (2008)
- La loba (2010)
- Quererte Así (2012)

=== As host ===
- Espacio en Blanco (2006)
- Nocturninos (2008 - 2009)
- Muévete
- Para todos
- Justo a tiempo (2010)
- Venga la alegría (2012)
- N2Ruedas (2013)
- Sale el Sol (2016-2019)
