= Sale el Sol (TV program) =

Mexican television morning show

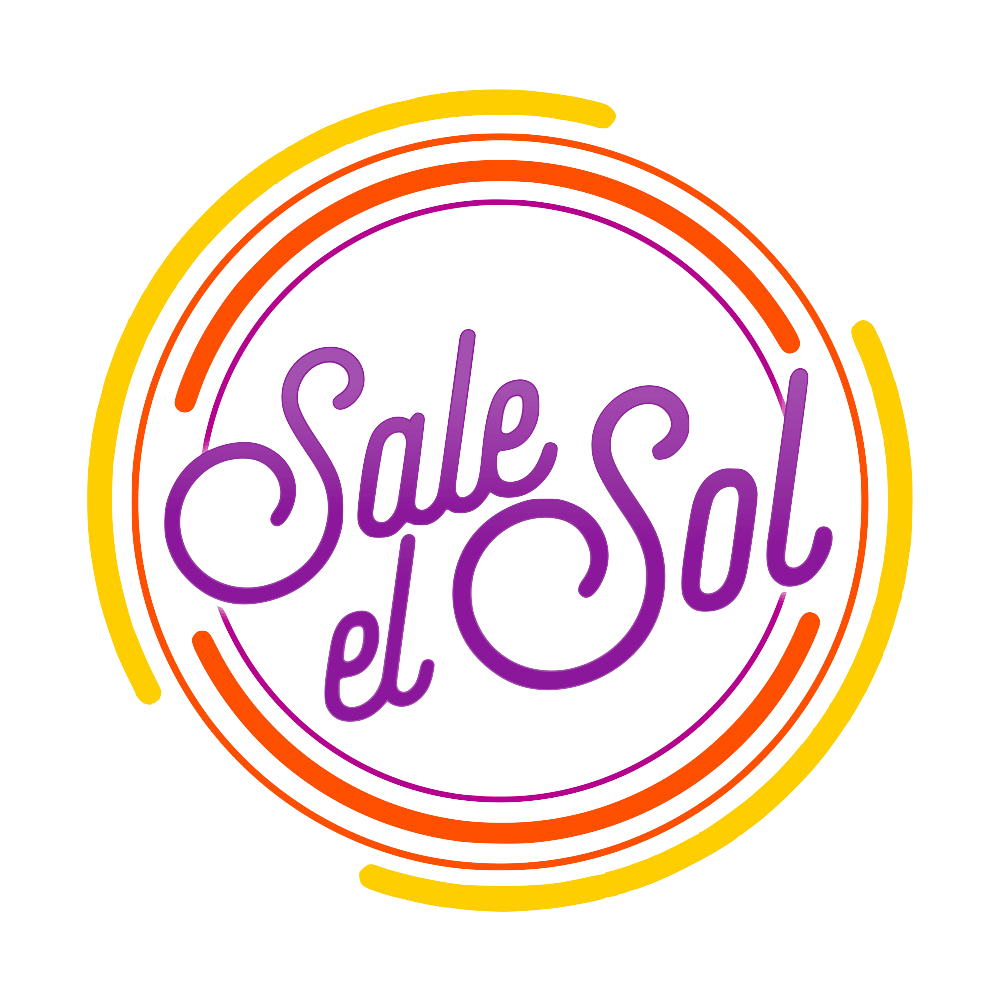
- Genre: Morning news/talk Interview
- Presented by: Luz María Zetina; Carlos Arenas; Paulina Mercado; Talina Fernández; Carlos Quirarte
- Opening theme: "Sale el Sol" by Nébulas
- Country of origin: Mexico
- Original language: Spanish
- No. of seasons: 4

Production
- Producers: Andrés Tovar (2016–present); Natalia Pereda Fernández (2019–present); David Ortiz Marquet (2017–2019); Eric Reid (2016–2017)
- Production locations: Mexico City, Mexico (2016–present)
- Camera setup: Multi-camera
- Running time: 180 minutes (including commercials)
- Production company: Grupo Imagen

Original release
- Network: Imagen Televisión
- Release: October 18, 2016 – present

Related
- Nuestro Día

Sale el Sol (English: The Sun Comes Out, Spanish: [ˌsa.le el ˈsol]) is a Mexican television daily morning program produced by Andrés Tovar for Imagen Televisión. The program is intended for the general public and includes various sections and topics of interest related to beauty, cooking, entertainment, horoscopes, sexuality, tips, reflections, promotions, interviews, shows and music. It is one of the first programs broadcast by the new Grupo Imagen's television network, launched on October 17, 2016.

It is broadcast live from the studios of Ciudad Imagen on Av. Copilco, Coyoacán in Mexico City, Mexico, and is hosted by Luz María Zetina, Carlos Arenas, Paulina Mercado, Talina Fernández and Carlos Quirarte. It premiered on October 18, 2016, and currently airs Monday through Friday from 9:00 a.m. to 12:00 p.m (UTC).

== On-air staff ==
=== Current ===
==== Presenters ====
Name	Debut
Luz María Zetina	(2016– 2021)
Carlos Arenas	(2016–present)
Paulina Mercado	(2016–present)
Bárbara Torres	(2019–present)
Carlos Quirarte	(2020–present)

==== Contributors ====
Entertainment

- Ana María Alvarado (2016–present)
- Hector Vargas (2016–present)
- Joanna Vega-Briesto (2018–present)
- Manolo Carmona (2018–present)

Specialists

- Pepe Bandera (2016–present)
- Julie Salomón (2016–present)
- Rox Armendariz (2017–present)
- Odín Dupeyrón (2017–present)
- Daniel Habif (2017–present)
- Maryfer Centeno (2020–present)

News

- Efrén Argüelles (2017–present)
- Enrique Villanueva (2017–present)
- Hiram Hurtado (2019–present)

Horoscopes

- Mhoni "Vidente" (2016–2017) (2019–present)
- Mario Vannucci (2019–present)

Chefs

- Linda Cherem (2016–present)
- Ingrid Ramos (2018–present)
- Jose Ramón Castillo (2018–present)
- Antonio de Luvier (2019–present)

Reporters

- Flavio Machucca (2016–present)
- Fanny Contreras (2016–present)
- Omar Argueta (2018–present)
- Ana Alicia Alba (2018–present)
- Sajid Fonseca (2018–present)
- Eliuth Arce (2019–present)

=== Former ===
- Gustavo Adolfo Infante (2016–2020)
- Mauricio Barcelata (2016–2019)
- Natalia Delgado (2016–2019)
- Juán Jerónimo (2016–2019)
- Nacho Lozano (2016–2019)
- Estefania Saracho (2016–2018)
- Óscar Madrazo (2016–2018)
- Paulina Madrazo (2016–2018)

- Alfonso León (2016–2018)
- Natalia Coppola (2016–2018)
- Diego Barrios (2016–2018)
- Jarí Marquez (2016–2018)
- Francisco Zea (2016–2017)
- Daniel Fryman (2016–2017)
- Roberto Carlo (2017–2020)
- Talina Fernández (2020–2022)

== Segments ==
=== Current ===
Title	Notes
Pajaros en el Alambre	Presented by Ana María Alvarado, Joanna Vega-Briesto, Héctor Vargas and Carlos Quirarte
Minuto de Café	Presented by the hosts where an intention is prepared to accompany the program of the day.
Cocina de Solteros	Presented by Carlos Arenas.
Frente a Frente	Presented by the hosts where they interview and question their guests.
Picando la Noticia	Presented by Enrique Villanueva.
Sobre la Mesa	
Al Limite de la Fama	Presented by Mauricio Barcelata until 2019 alongside Hector Vargas and Joanna Vega-Briesto.
El Cochinito	Presented by Daniel Urías.

=== Former ===
Title	Notes
El Termómetro	Presented by Jari Márquez.
El Ventilador	Presented by Diego Barrios.
De Lunas y Estrellas	Presented by Natalia Coppola.
De Pisa y Corre	Presented by Nacho Lozano. The segment has its own program that premiered in 2019.
Arquitecto de Sueños	Presented by Alfonso León.
Conciencia Animal	Presented by Estefania Saracho.
Casos sin Respuestas	Presented by Carlos Arenas and Roberto Carlo.
Stalkeando-Ando	Presented by the host where they present the stories and states of people in social networks.
Atrapados en las Red	Presented by the host where they present the most viral videos on the internet.
Cartas No Entregadas	Presented by Luz María Zetina and Mauricio Barcelata.
