= Ingrid Coronado =

Mexican television personality

Ingrid Coronado Fritz
- Born: July 12, 1974 (age 51); Mexico City, Mexico
- Occupation: TV Host
- Years active: 1994–2022
- Website: http://www.ingridcoronado.mx

Ingrid Coronado Fritz (Spanish pronunciation: [ˈiŋɡɾið koɾoˈnaðo]; born July 12, 1974, in Mexico City, Mexico) is a retired Mexican television personality.

== Early life ==
As a child, Fritz took singing, ballet, piano and acting lessons. Later on, she developed her artistic career performing as a singer and TV host.

== Career ==
Fritz took part as a back-up vocalist in recordings for Timbiriche, TVO, Chabelo, and Denise de Kalafe. She also performed as a host at festivals in Acapulco, Guerrero and at the Univision show Control.

In 1994 Fritz joined the group Garibaldi, replacing Patricia Manterola. During this time, Ingrid got involved in a relationship with Charly López and gave birth to her first child, Emiliano. They broke up at the end of 1998.

Afterwards she joined the show Tempranito. She began to acquire more spaces within the show until she became one of the main hosts. Later, she became the host of the contest show Sexos en guerra, together with Fernando del Solar. She continued to work in Mexican TV as the host of the show Venga la alegría until her retirement in 2022.

== Personal life ==
On May 13, 2008, Ingrid announced her engagement to Argentine entertainer Fernando del Solar. The relationship was confirmed by the couple during the live transmission of Venga la alegría, where she confirmed that she was pregnant with Fernando's child. She now has two kids with him. Ingrid has been the TV host of La Academia in seasons 7, 8 and 10 (only hosting season 9 in the last two concerts, replacing Bibi Gaytán after she was fired), La Academia Kids, Soy tu doble and Soy tu doble VIP, all produced by TV Azteca.

In 2012, Del Solar was diagnosed with cancer.

== TV work ==
- Tempranito (1998)
- Sexos en guerra (2002)
- Venga la alegría (2006–2009, 2015–2022)
- La Nueva Academia (2009)
- La Academia Bicentenario (2010)
- La Academia 2011 (2011; only in the last two concerts, replacing Bibi Gaytán after she was fired)
- Soy tu doble (2012)
- La Academia 10 años (2012)
- La Academia Kids Lala (2013)
- Soy tu doble VIP (2014)
- La Academia Kids 2 (2014)
