= Gustavo Adolfo Infante =

Mexican TV host

- Born: Gustavo Adolfo Infante Seañez; April 14, 1965 (age 61); Ciudad de México, Mexico
- Occupation: Broadcast journalist
- Years active: 1985-
- Television: De Primera Mano
- Spouse: Verónica Cuevas (m. 2001)
- Children: 2

Gustavo Adolfo Infante Seañez (born April 14, 1965) is a Mexican TV host, best known for his collaborations with Grupo Imagen and the Spanish-language television network Univision. He was the host for De Primera Mano and previously hosted Sale el Sol's entertainment-segment Pajaros en el Alambre.
