= Myriam discography =

- Studio albums: 8
- Extended plays: 1
- Compilation albums: 2
- Singles: 10
- Video albums: 1
- Music videos: 2

The discography of Myriam, consist of 8 studio albums, 1 Special Edition, 2 album Compilation, 1 EP, ten singles, and two music videos.

== Albums ==
=== Studio albums ===
List of studio albums, with selected chart positions and certifications
Title	Album details	Certifications
Mi historia en la Academia	Released: December, 2002; Label: EMI Music; Formats: CD, digital download	AMPROFON: 2× Platinum + 2xGold
Una Mujer	Released: March, 2003; Label: EMI Music; Formats: CD, digital download	AMPROFON: 2× Platinum
Myriam	Released: July 2004; Label: EMI Music; Formats: CD, digital download	AMPROFON: 2× Platinum
Vete de Aqui	Released: October 2005; Label: EMI Music; Formats: CD, digital download	AMPROFON: Gold
Simplemente Amigos	Released: February 2007; Label: EMI Music; Formats: CD, digital download	AMPROFON: Gold
Cambio de Piel	Released: March 2008; Label: EMI Music; Formats: CD, digital download	
Regio Corazon, Alma Mexicana	Released: February 2011; Label: EMI Music; Formats: CD, digital download	
10 Años	Released: December 11, 2012; Label: EMI Music; Formats: CD, digital download	

=== Compilation albums ===
Title	Album details
Lo mejor de Myriam	Released: July 2007; Label: EMI Music; Formats: CD, digital download

== EPs ==
Title	Album details
Plug & Play	Released: 2007; Label: EMI Music; Formats: CD, digital download

== DVDs ==
Title	Album details	Certifications
Mi historia en DVD	Released: 2004; Label: EMI Music; Formats: DVD	AMPROFON: Gold

== Singles ==
List of Spanish singles, with selected chart positions, showing year released and album name
Title	Year	Peak chart positions	Album
Title	Year	MEX	Album
"Sin ti no hay nada"	2003	3	Una Mujer
"Corazón sin dueño"	2003	9	Una Mujer
"Hasta el Limite"	2004	1	Myriam
"Por que soy mujer"	2004	63	Myriam
"Vete de aqui"	2005	15	Vete de Aqui
"Lo que siento es amor"	2006	65	Vete de Aqui
"Simplemente amigos"	2007	89	Simplemente Amigos
"Dejarselo a la suerte"	2008	15	Cambio de Piel
"Lo que quiero de ti"	2009	90	Cambio de Piel
"Usame"	2010	17	Cambio de Piel

== Music videos ==
Title	Year
"Hasta el limite"	2013
"Vete de aqui"	2014
