= Vivir a destiempo =

- Genre: Drama romance black humor
- Created by: Eric Vonn
- Written by: Eric Vonn
- Directed by: Javier Patrón Fox; Fabián Corres
- Starring: Humberto Zurita; Edith González; Ramiro Fumazoni; Andrea Noli; Martha Verduzco; Juan Manuel Bernal; Veronica Merchant
- Theme music composer: Jorge Avendaño Lührs
- Opening theme: "Vivir a Destiempo" by Aranza
- Country of origin: Mexico
- Original language: Spanish
- No. of episodes: 150 (list of episodes)

Production
- Executive producer: Fides Velasco
- Producer: Jacky Castro
- Production location: Mexico City
- Cinematography: Jorge Medina; Gerardo Saucedo
- Editors: Mauricio Espejel; Reyna Estudillo
- Camera setup: Multi-camera
- Running time: 39–44 minutes
- Production company: Azteca

Original release
- Network: Azteca Trece; Azteca America
- Release: February 25 – September 20, 2013

Related
- Los Rey; Hombre tenías que ser

Vivir a destiempo (literally: Living Untimely; official release: Timeless Love) is a Mexican telenovela produced by Fides Velasco and Jacky Castro for Azteca. It stars Edith González and Ramiro Fumazoni as the protagonists alongside Humberto Zurita, Andrea Noli and Wendy de los Cobos as the main villains. The original story and screenplay is written by Eric Vonn. From February 25 to September 20, 2013, Azteca 13 broadcast Vivir a Destiempo, replacing Los Rey.

== Production ==
- Eric Vonn has begun writing "A Contratiempo" in December 2012. Due to "A Contratiempo" being registered already by another producer, he changed the title of this telenovela to "Contracorriente". The telenovela changed the title again to "Vivir a Destiempo" because of already registered one by another producer.
- First promotional aired on Azteca Trece on January 29.
- Aura Cristina Geithner was initially confirmed for the character "Amparo" but was eventually replaced by Wendy de los Cobos.
- Filming begun on February 7, 2013. Most of the exterior shots were filmed in Historic center of Mexico City, in Colonia Roma and Colonia Condesa neighborhoods and on Mexico City Light Rail stations.
- As the novela has lot of high tone content, Edith González uses double for sex scenes, as she has been doing in all novelas after she gave birth.
- Due to great success, Azteca's headquarters asked Eric Vonn to extend telenovela from planned 120 episodes to 150. As of June 5, 2013, 100 episodes of screenplay are ready.
- As of July 16, Eric Vonn has only 9 episodes of screenplay to write till the end.
- Screenplay of last episode, number 150 was delivered from Eric Vonn to production team on 19 July.

== Opening sequence ==
Javier "Fox" Patron directed the opening sequence of the series with Alexa camera using cinematographic techniques. On January 31, some parts of opening sequence were filmed. It resumed on February 7. The filming locations are Corredor Madero, Eje vial Lázaro Cárdenas (Bellas Artes, Torre Latinoamericana), Parque Hundido, Mexico City Light Rail and San Ángel.

== Theme song ==
Aranza, best known as the singer of Dime, the theme song to Mirada de Mujer, sang the opening theme of the series. The song was written and produced by Jorge Avendaño Lührs, who wrote the theme song to 1993's Corazón Salvaje starring Edith González. In the opening sequence, the second verse is sung in a higher note.

On August 1, Azteca Musica launched the album "Vivir a Destiempo" featuring the theme songs and some popular songs by Aranza.

== Autograph session ==
The first autograph session was held on April 19 in Mexico City. It is expected to be held in various cities in the United States.

Date	Time	Location	Cast
April 19, 2013	6:00pm	Centro Comercial Perisur, Mexico City	Edith, Ramiro, Andrea, Juan Manuel, Wendy

== Synopsis ==
Paula Duarte and Alejandro Monroy were happily engaged in their youth. They ended the relationship when Alejandro left to study abroad, forced by his father. His father did not approve of Paula as she did not seem apropiate for him due to her middle-class background. Paula's father, a manic-depressive man, commits suicide. She, her mother and sister are forced to cope alone. Looking for a way to forget Alejandro and the death of her father, Paula begins dating Rogelio Bermúdez. He's a handsome, funny and experienced man, they soon start a relationship and become pregnant. They marry and have two children: Daniel and Tania. Alejandro later in life marries Amparo Ávalos, a beautiful but promiscuous and capricious woman. They have a son, Eduardo. Over the years, Alejandro divorces his wife, sick of her high maintenance.

Paula and Alejandro meet again many years later, when their children start a relationship upon meeting in university. Over the years her happy relationship with her husband turns sour as she can not forget her past love Alejandro. Rogelio, due to this has become a misogynist and domineering man, with whom she was deeply unhappy. Love struggles to break through again between Paula and Alejandro, but her still intact marriage and children keep them separated.

The story chronicles the lives of all the characters who seem to be immersed in between conflict, love, and ambition. Paula discovers that Rogelio, her husband is cheating with someone she trusts blindly and begins working to feel some independence after her friend offers her a job at her retailor office. Meanwhile, Alejandro continues to pursue her despite her marriage and the idea of being with him stops Paula from working at her marriage. She decides to call of their marriage and give herself a chance to be happy with Alejandro. However, the things prove to become difficult and life stops them at every turn.

Vivir a Destiempo depicts the struggles of three middle-class and two upper class families in challenging times.

== Cast ==
Actor	Character	Description
Humberto Zurita	Rogelio Bermúdez	Paula's ex-husband, Daniel and Tania's father, Carolina's son-in-law, Sonia's brother-in-law/lover
Edith González	Paula Duarte	Rogelio's ex-wife, Daniel and Tania's mother, Sonia's sister, Carolina's daughter
Ramiro Fumazoni	Alejandro Monroy	Amparo's ex-husband, Eduardo's father, Salvador's best friend
Andrea Noli	Sonia Duarte	Carolina's daughter, Paula's sister, Rogelio's sister-in-law/lover, Julio's biological mother
Martha Verduzco	Carolina de Rosario Duarte	Paula and Sonia's mother, Daniel, Julio and Tania's grandmother, Rogelio's mother-in-law
Juan Manuel Bernal	Patricio Delgado	Félix's son, Cristina's husband, Berenice's father
Veronica Merchant	Cristina Delgado	Patricio's wife, Cristina's mother, Félix's daughter-in-law
Wendy de los Cobos	Amparo Ávalos	Alejandro's ex-wife, Eduardo's mother, Beatriz and Karina's best friend
Víctor Huggo Martín	Salvador Chinchilla	Alejandro's best friend, Sonia's ex-boyfriend, Julio's biological father
María Reneé Prudencio	Beatriz Valadez Ruíz vda. de Montenegro	Julio's foster mother, Alejandro and Amparo's friend
Marcela Guirado	Tania Bermúdez	Paula and Rogelio's daughter, Daniel's sister, Eduardo's girlfriend
Miriam Higareda	Berenice Delgado	Patricio and Cristina's daughter, Félix's granddaughter
José González Márquez	Félix "El Tigré" Delgado	Patricio's father, Cristina's father-in-law, Berenice's grandfather
Carlos Martínez	Daniel Bermúdez	Rogelio and Paula's son, Tania's brother
Mayra Sierra	Mirna	Eladío and Chole's daughter, secretary in Monroy Publishing
José Carlos Rodríguez	Eladío	Mirna's father
Cecilia Romo	Ursula	Mirna's landlord
Rodolfo Arias	Jose Luis Cervantes	Member of the swingers club
Amara Villafuerte	Leila	Host of the swingers club event
Israel Amescua	Mauricio Campos	Martín and Eleonora's son, Rocio's brother
Luciano Zacharski	Eduardo Monroy	Alejandro and Amparo's son, Tania's boyfriend, Julio's best friend
German Girotti	Julio Montenegro Valadez	Sonia and Salvador's son, Beatriz's adopted son, Eduardo's best friend
Roberta Burns	Marisol	Tania's friend in the rehabilitation clinic
Ivonne Zurita	Rocío Campos	Martín and Eleonora's daughter, Mauricio's sister
Irene Arcila		
Alfonso Bravo	Ernesto	Rogelio's hitman
Lorenzo Narváez	Fabio	Marisol's friend, one of the Berenice's abusers
Gabriela Roel	Eleonora Campos	Martín's wife, Rocio and Mauricio's mother
Carmen Madrid	Karina Gómez	Amparo's best friend
Carmen Delgado	Chole	Mirna's mother
Rafael Sánchez Navarro	Martín Campos	Eleonora's husband, Rocio and Mauricio's father
Gabriela Barajas	Petra	Paula's housekeeper, Mirna's friend
Jessica Roteache	Liliana Roche	Daniel's colleague and girlfriend
Aranza	Herself	Singer of the main theme song in the episode final
