= Jorge Avendaño =

- Born: Jorge Avendaño
- Occupations: Pianist, composer, songwriter and music producer.
- Instrument: piano
- Website: www.jorgeavendano.com

Jorge Avendaño (born Jorge Avendaño Lührs) is a Mexican pianist, composer, songwriter and music producer.

He has written music for many telenovelas including the 1993 version of Corazón salvaje for which he wrote its theme song, as well as the theme song and music for Amarte Asi. He has produced albums for Ana Bárbara, Patricia Manterola and Edith Márquez, for which he wrote the song "Enamorada" that was featured in the film Y tu mamá también.

== Life ==
He was born in the city of Monterrey, Mexico

He has written and recorded music por top artists, including personalities like Plácido Domingo (Alborada), Sarah Brightman (Symphony, A Winter Symphony), Fernando Lima (Pasión), Edith Márquez, Mijares, Ricardo Montaner, Aleks Syntek, Pedro Fernández, Emmanuel, Francisco Céspedes, Cristian Castro, Jorge Muñíz, MónicaNaranjo, David Bustamante, Yuri, Los Nocheros, Pepe Aguilar, Límite, Charlie Zaa, Elefante, Ana Gabriel, Aranza, Ana Cirré, Dulce, Amanda Miguel, ShaylaDúrcal, Amaury Gutiérrez, Ana Bárbara, Julián, Sheyla, Francisco, Eddie Herrera, Estrella, Claudia Sierra, and Carlo Meucci among others.

He studied in the National Music School of UNAM and finished his studies in composition, harmony and counter point, as well as orchestration and music analysis with the eminent Mexican composer Humberto Hernández Medrano, founder of the workshop for polyphonic studies, as well as piano with Néstor Castañeda León.

His versatility is notable with productions ranging from Opera/Crossover to Pop and Latin music. Proof of this are two projects where he mixes Arias from opera with Boleros called “Boleropera” and “Diva y Reyna”.

His music was also used in the Atlanta Olympics of 1996 by the Mexican synchronized swimming teams and by Rumania in Artistic Gymnastics.

Jorge Avendaño’s music is famous wherever there’s telenovelas, more than 60 for which he has written music.

He composed the music for the bio series “Frente a ti” about the life of the Mexican diva Silvia Pinal in 2018, and "Ellas Soy Yo" based on the life of Gloria Trevi (2023)

Together with film producer Pepe Bojórquez he has worked in many films such as Luna Escondida, Más Sabe el Diablo, as well as Netflix Production “Como Caído del Cielo” in 2019; recently for Amazon Prime "Ahora que no estás" (2024) For Telemundo NBC "Juego de Mentiras" (2023) and "Vuelve a mí" (2024)

He has also composed music for Symphonic and Chamber Orchestra and his Piano Concert and orchestra of the music of Cri Cri was composed especially for the “Festival y Concurso Internacional Raíces México 2014”, celebrated in the Conservatorio Nacional de Música.

He was an author for the Sociedad general de Autores y Editores (SGAE) from 1996 to 2019 and he is a current active member of BMI (USA) since 2020.

He is perhaps one of the most prolific composers of music for television of all time and has received countless awards and recognitions, both in the music industry and television, as well as the Grammy as both Producer and Composer.

== Films ==
- La metiche (1990)

== Telenovelas ==
=== Incidental music ===
- Vuelve a mí (2023)
- Juego de mentiras (2023)
- Prohibido Amar (2011)
- Vivir a Destiempo (2012)
- Quererte Asi (2012)
- La Mujer de Judas (2012)
- Emperatriz (2011)
- Profugas del Destino (2010)
- La Loba (2010)
- Mujer Comprada (2009)
- Vuelveme a Querer (2009)
- Eternamente Tuya (2009)
- Amarte así (2005)
- Gitanas (2004)
- Mujer bonita (2001)
- Alborada (2005)
- La esposa virgen (2005)
- La madrastra (2005)
- Alma rebelde (1999)
- Infierno en el Paraíso
- Desencuentro (1997)
- Gente bien (1997)
- Morir dos veces (1996)
- Corazón salvaje (1993)
- Yo compro esa mujer (1990)
- Laberintos de pasión (1999)

=== Original score ===
- Vuelve a mí (2023)
- Juego de mentiras (2023)
- Mariana de la noche (2003)
- Amor real (2003)
- Ladrón de corazones (2003)
- Niña... amada mía (2003)
- Entre el amor y el odio (2002)
- La intrusa (2001)
- Abrázame muy fuerte (2000)
- Amor gitano (1999)
- Por tu amor (1999)
- La Antorcha Encendida (1998)
- El privilegio de amar (1998)

=== Theme songs ===
Song	Telenovela	Year	Performer
"Laberintos"	Velvet: El nuevo imperio	2025	Lucero and Manuel Mijares
"Vuelve a mí"	Vuelve a mí	2023	Claudia Sierra
"Juego de mentiras"	Juego de mentiras	2023	Aleks Syntek and Ronkiu "El Kubano"
"Vivir a Destiempo"	Vivir a Destiempo	2013	Aranza
"Quererte Así"	Quererte Así	2012	Esmeralda Ugalde and Erick Sandoval
"Amor de Leyenda"	La Mujer de Judas	2012	Dulce
"Emperatriz de mis sueños"	Emperatriz	2011	Mónica Naranjo
"Ay Amor"	Prófugas del Destino	2010	Claudia Sierra
"Las Leyes del Corazón"	La Loba	2010	Ana Gabriel
"Vuélveme a Querer"	Vuélveme a Querer	2009	Amaury Gutiérrez
"La Fuerza del Destino"	Mujer Comprada	2009	Cynthia and Adrián Varela
"Eternamente Tuya"	Eternamente tuya	2009	Claudia Sierra
"Pasión"	Pasión	2007	Sarah Brightman and Fernando Lima
"Ay Gaviota"	Destilando Amor	2007	Angelica Rivera
"Ladrón de Corazones"	Ladrón de corazones	2003	Elefante
"¡Vivan los niños!"	¡Vivan los niños!	2002	OV7
"La Intrusa"	La Intrusa	2001	Emmanuel
"Si He Sabido Amor"	Infierno en el paraíso	1999	Alejandro Fernández
"Si tú Quisieras"	Gente bien	1997	Patricia Manterola
"Amor Gitano"	Amor Gitano	1999	Carlos Enrique Iglesias
"Corazón Salvaje"	Corazón salvaje	1993	Mijares
"Gotita de amor"	Gotita de amor	1998	Tatiana
"El Privilegio de Amar"	El Privilegio de Amar	1998	Lucero & Mijares
"Morelia"	Morelia	1995	Cristian Castro
