= Juego de mentiras =

- Genre: Drama
- Created by: Sebastián Arrau
- Written by: Sebastián Arrau; Berenice Cárdenas; Felipe Silva; Adela Boltansky
- Directed by: Eduardo Ripari; Ricardo Schwarz; Uandari Gómez
- Starring: Arap Bethke; Altair Jarabo; María Elisa Camargo
- Theme music composer: Jorge Avendaño Lührs
- Opening theme: "Juego de mentiras" by Aleks Syntek feat. Ronkiu "El Kubano"
- Composer: Joaquín Fernández
- Country of origin: United States
- Original language: Spanish
- No. of seasons: 1
- No. of episodes: 76

Production
- Executive producers: Ximena Cantuarias; Rafael Urióstegui; Elizabeth Suárez; Karen Barroeta
- Editor: Ellery Albarran
- Production company: Telemundo Global Studios

Original release
- Network: Telemundo
- Release: 7 March – 4 July 2023

Juego de mentiras (English: Game of Lies) is an American television series that aired on Telemundo from 7 March 2023 to 4 July 2023. It is an original story created by Sebastián Arrau. It stars Arap Bethke, Altair Jarabo and María Elisa Camargo.

== Plot ==
The series revolves around the disappearance of Adriana Molina (María Elisa Camargo). Her husband, César Ferrer (Arap Bethke), is the prime suspect in the possible murder. To avoid losing his eight-year-old daughter, César investigates his wife's disappearance on his own. His search for clues to Adriana's disappearance leads him to discover that she had been living a double life and had a lover from a wealthy and powerful family.

== Cast ==
=== Main ===
- Arap Bethke as César Ferrer
- Altaír Jarabo as Camila del Río
- María Elisa Camargo as Adriana Molina
- Rodrigo Guirao as Francisco Javier del Río
- Cynthia Klitbo as Renata del Río
- Eduardo Yáñez as Pascual del Río
- Pepe Gámez as Jesús "Chuy" Marín
- Alberto Casanova as Elvis Barros
- Alicia Machado as Alejandra Edwards
- Beatriz Valdés as Elvira Gomez
- Gabriela Vergara as Eva Rojas
- Patricio Gallardo as Tomás del Río
- Bárbara Garofalo as Inés Urrutia
- María Laura Quintero as Linda Marquez
- Camila Nuñez as Noelia Ferrer

=== Recurring ===
- Eneida Mascetti as Doña Gracia
- Manuela Corzo as Estela Montoya
- Jesús Nasser as Manuel "El Mono"
- Angelo Jamaica as Moisés Alto
- Chela Arias as Olga
- Francisco Porras as Pluto
- Karla Peniche as Yvonne González
- Denisse Novoa as Jacinta Zamora
- José Mizrahi as Escobar
- José Alberto Torres as Federico
- Ezequiel Montalt as Raymundo Edwards
- Camila Arteche as Verónica Baeza
- Argelia García as Luisa Ullola
- Vanessa Lyon as Paola
- Carolina Perpetuo as Nicole
- Neher Jacqueline Briceño as Nun
- Arian Cartaya as Miguel

=== Guest stars ===
- Aylín Mújica as Rocío Jimenez

== Production ==
=== Development ===
On 15 February 2022, the series was announced at Telemundo's virtual screening event with the working title Culpable o inocente. In May 2022, the series was presented during Telemundo's upfront for the 2022–2023 television season. On 13 August 2022, it was announced that the official title of the series would be Juego de mentiras. Filming of the series began on 15 August 2022 in Miami, United States, and concluded on 3 December 2022. On 26 January 2023, Telemundo released the first official trailer for the series.

=== Casting ===
On 28 July 2022, Alicia Machado announced that she would be part of the main cast. On 13 August 2022, Arap Bethke, Altair Jarabo and María Elisa Camargo were announced in the lead roles, and an extensive cast list was published in a press release.

== Episodes ==
No.	Title	Original release date	U.S. viewers (millions)
1	"¿Quién era Adriana Molina?"	7 March 2023	0.86
2	"Culpable o inocente"	8 March 2023	0.81
3	"Diana de nadie"	9 March 2023	0.81
4	"Cuando la ilusión se acaba"	10 March 2023	0.68
5	"El carpintero fiel"	13 March 2023	0.87
6	"La hija"	14 March 2023	0.82
7	"Dura separación"	15 March 2023	0.74
8	"La novia de papá"	16 March 2023	0.73
9	"Ana Rivero"	17 March 2023	0.70
10	"Por fin nos vemos las caras"	20 March 2023	0.72
11	"La huérfana"	21 March 2023	0.74
12	"El depósito"	22 March 2023	0.75
13	"Desaparece por un millón"	23 March 2023	0.85
14	"La partida"	24 March 2023	0.65
15	"Sacrificio de amor"	27 March 2023	0.67
16	"Inés, la cómplice"	28 March 2023	0.65
17	"Primer cumpleaños sin tí"	29 March 2023	0.68
18	"El peor de todos"	30 March 2023	0.79
19	"El asesino en serie"	31 March 2023	0.78
20	"La cuarta víctima"	3 April 2023	0.70
21	"Los buitres de la prensa"	4 April 2023	0.76
22	"La prensa se enamora"	5 April 2023	0.82
23	"Quién es Kevin"	6 April 2023	0.74
24	"Los secretos de la senadora"	10 April 2023	0.88
25	"El secuestro"	11 April 2023	0.64
26	"El regreso de Adriana"	12 April 2023	0.77
27	"El escondite de Adriana"	13 April 2023	0.71
28	"Mamá no te vayas"	14 April 2023	0.75
29	"El amor cuesta"	17 April 2023	0.65
30	"El milagro de la senadora"	18 April 2023	0.70
31	"La boda"	20 April 2023	0.63
32	"El rescate"	21 April 2023	0.73
33	"Bienvenida a casa"	25 April 2023	0.68
34	"Amores incompletos"	26 April 2023	0.63
35	"La Sirena"	27 April 2023	0.65
36	"Peligro inminente"	28 April 2023	0.60
37	"La familia perfecta"	1 May 2023	0.72
38	"Mariana Stanford"	2 May 2023	0.70
39	"El parque"	3 May 2023	0.66
40	"La muerte de Adriana y sus vidas"	4 May 2023	0.64
41	"Hasta nunca Adriana"	5 May 2023	0.71
42	"La fuga"	8 May 2023	0.72
43	"Marcial Herrera"	9 May 2023	0.63
44	"La confesión"	10 May 2023	0.68
45	"La ruta del amor"	11 May 2023	0.74
46	"Prófugos los dos"	12 May 2023	0.61
47	"El error de Noelia"	15 May 2023	0.80
48	"El prisionero"	16 May 2023	0.78
49	"Hasta nunca, fiel secretaria"	17 May 2023	0.95
50	"Entierro sin funeral"	19 May 2023	0.71
51	"Cara sucia"	22 May 2023	N/A
52	"Todo es culpa de la traición"	23 May 2023	N/A
53	"El entierro de Eva Rojas"	24 May 2023	N/A
54	"El primer hogar"	25 May 2023	N/A
55	"Abre los ojos"	29 May 2023	N/A
56	"Entre la vida y la muerte"	30 May 2023	N/A
57	"La inminente victoria"	31 May 2023	N/A
58	"El crucifijo"	1 June 2023	N/A
59	"Nada es igual"	5 June 2023	N/A
60	"El juicio"	6 June 2023	N/A
61	"Adiós, hermana Mariana"	7 June 2023	N/A
62	"El regreso de Mariana Stanford"	8 June 2023	N/A
63	"Sin otra opción"	12 June 2023	N/A
64	"El duelo"	13 June 2023	N/A
65	"El sobrino"	14 June 2023	N/A
66	"Un amor inconcluso"	15 June 2023	N/A
67	"El profesor"	19 June 2023	N/A
68	"Es su padre"	20 June 2023	N/A
69	"El impostor"	21 June 2023	N/A
70	"La sospecha de Camila"	22 June 2023	N/A
71	"Padre e hijo"	26 June 2023	N/A
72	"Cazando al cazador"	27 June 2023	N/A
73	"Medios hermanos"	28 June 2023	N/A
74	"Víctima de mi hermano"	29 June 2023	N/A
75	"Una vida por otra"	3 July 2023	N/A
76	"Pocas tortugas llegan al mar"	4 July 2023	N/A

== Reception ==
=== Ratings ===
Viewership and ratings per season of Juego de mentiras
Season	Timeslot (ET)	Episodes	First aired		Last aired		Avg. viewers (millions)
Season	Timeslot (ET)	Episodes	Date	Viewers (millions)	Date	Viewers (millions)	Avg. viewers (millions)
1	Mon–Fri 10:00 p.m. (1–50); Mon–Fri 12:00 a.m. (51–76)	50	7 March 2023	0.86	4 July 2023	N/A	0.73

=== Awards and nominations ===
Year	Award	Category	Nominated	Result	Ref
2023	Produ Awards	Best Music Theme - Superseries or Telenovela	"Juego de mentiras" by Aleks Syntek feat. Ronkiu "El Kubano"	Nominated	

== Music ==
Juego de mentiras (Soundtrack)

Soundtrack album by Jorge Avendaño Lührs
- Released: 16 May 2023
- Length: 38:19
- Label: Discos Telemundo
- Producer: Jorge Avendaño Lührs

Juego de mentiras (Soundtrack) is the soundtrack to the series. It was released by Discos Telemundo on 16 May 2023. It features 16 score cues composed by Jorge Avendaño Lührs, and the theme song of series performed by Aleks Syntek.

All music is composed by Lührs.

No.	Title	Length
1.	"Juego de mentiras (Full Mix)" (Aleks Syntek)	3:56
2.	"Be Careful"	1:52
3.	"Delusion"	2:21
4.	"Dirty Face"	1:51
5.	"En La Intriga 01"	2:13
6.	"Faded Memories"	2:04
7.	"Far Away"	3:05
8.	"In Trouble"	2:24
9.	"La Tristesse"	2:20
10.	"Obsesiones"	2:43
11.	"Pas&Eva - Misterios (Full Mix)"	2:28
12.	"Preguntas sin Respuesta Recaps"	2:02
13.	"Run & Hide"	1:13
14.	"Ruta de Escape"	1:12
15.	"Taking the Pulse"	1:49
16.	"Una Duda Interminable"	3:34
17.	"Wild End Strings"	1:04
Total length:		38:19
