= Desafio de Estrellas =

Mexican musical TV show

- 2006 Logo
- Starring: Daniel Bisogno
- Judges: Enrique Guzmán
- Country of origin: Mexico

Production
- Running time: 7:00pm-10:00pm

Original release
- Network: TV Azteca (Mex) Azteca America (United States)
- Release: June 11, 2003 – present

Desafío de Estrellas is a Mexican musical show produced and distributed by TV Azteca, the second largest network in the country. The format of the Desafío is similar to American Idol with contestants eliminated every week and a grand finale with the top contestants competing to win the first place prize. TV Azteca has, until 2006, produced two versions of the program, one in 2003 and the other in 2006. The 2003 version consisted only of former contestants of La Academia, another TV Azteca-produced show which had already finished two seasons and, in the process, taken away rating share from Televisa, the largest network in the country. The 2006 version, on the other hand, consisted of both former contestants of La Academia (all four seasons), as well as other artists produced by TV Azteca in the middle and late '90s, later in 2009 a third season took place with former contestants of the six seasons of la academia.

== All the Desafíos de Estrellas ==
Season	Winner	Runner-up	2nd. Runner-Up	Other Finalists	Other Contestants (In Order of Elimination)	Number of Contestants
Season 1	Yahir	Nadia	Myriam	Erika & Estrella	Elisa, Mauricio, Gisela, Karla, Marvin, Fabricio, Alejandro, Wendolee, J.Antonio, VíctorJ; Azeneth, Alejandra, Andrea, Ana Lucía, Adrián, Enrique; Ma.Inés, Víctor, Freddy, Manuel, Rosalía, Marco, Héctor, M. Ángel, Laura, Toñita, Raúl	32
Season 2	Toñita	Erasmo	Raúl	Aranza, Carlos & Adrián	Rosalia, Cecilia, Cesar; Melissa, Sylvia, Paula; Marco, Manuel, J.Antonio; Aline, Leticia, Dulce, Claudia, Tony; J.Luis, Edgar, Yuridia, Luis, Erika, Benjamín, Estrella, Nadia, Jose Joel, Ale Ley, M. Ángel, Cynthia	32
Season 3	Fabiola	Myriam	Samuel	Travieso & Nadia	La Posta, Los Sandoval, Tinieblas, Tachidito, Beraka 5, Los de la mochila Azul, Las Güeras, Shanik/Christian, Vanessa Cato, Rigo Tovar Jr., Colette, Toñita, Edgar/Erasmo, Iván/Héctor/Gerardo/Matías, IQ, G6, Rosalía/Freddy/Marco, Aline, Atala, Las Reinas, Ivonne M; Cynthia/Jorge, Jose Joel/Marysol; M.Ángel, Luis A., Juan Rivera	32

== Desafío de Estrellas 2003 ==
- Participants - 32
- Winner - Yahir
- Runner-Up - Nadia
- Third Place - Myriam
- Fourth Place - Erika
- Fifth Place - Estrella

The 2003 version of the Desafío de Estrellas was announced right after the end of the second generation of La Academia. The 32 contestants which made up both generations would go on head-to-head to see what generation would get the best place. This expected competition was non-existent, as the participants of the 2nd generation were eliminated swiftly. Of the top 10 singers chosen by the public, only 1 had come out of the second generation, Erika, who would go on to become the fourth place of the competition. With a total of 15 concerts and above good ratings, TV Azteca confirmed its strong hold on the Mexican public.

=== Contestants ===
Name	Original Series	Eliminated
Yahir	La Academia 1	Winner
Nadia	La Academia 1	Episode 15 (2nd)
Myriam	La Academia 1	Episode 15 (3rd)
Erika	La Academia 2	Episode 15 (4th)
Estrella	La Academia 1	Episode 15 (5th)
Raul	La Academia 1	Episode 14
Toñita	La Academia 1	Episode 13
Laura Caro	La Academia 1	Episode 12
Miguel Angel	La Academia 1	Episode 11
Hector	La Academia 1	Episode 10
Marco More	La Academia 2	Episode 9
Rosalia	La Academia 2	Episode 8
Manuel	La Academia 2	Episode 7
Freddy	La Academia 2	Episode 6
Victor Garcia	La Academia 1	Episode 5 (Quit)
Maria Ines	La Academia 1	Episode 4
Enrique	La Academia 2	Episode 3
Adrian Carvajal	La Academia 2	Episode 3
Ana Lucia	La Academia 2	Episode 3
Alejandra Ordanza	La Academia 2	Episode 3
Andrea	La Academia 2	Episode 3
Azeneth	La Academia 2	Episode 3
Jose Antonio	La Academia 1	Episode 1
Wendolee	La Academia 1	Episode 1
Alejandro	La Academia 1	Episode 1
Elisa	La Academia 2	Episode 1
Gisela	La Academia 2	Episode 1
Marvin	La Academia 2	Episode 1
Karla	La Academia 2	Episode 1
Victor Javier	La Academia 2	Episode 1
Mauricio	La Academia 2	Episode 1
Fabricio	La Academia 2	Episode 1

=== Concerts ===
- Concert 1- The first concert saw the elimination of 10 artists, 7 of which were from the second generation (Elisa, Gisela, Karla, Mauricio, Fabricio, Víctor and Marvin), while only 3 were from the first (Wendolee, Alejandro and Jose Antonio).
- Concert 2- The second concert saw no eliminations, however, this concert was marked by the clear dominance of the first generation singers who received well better critics from the judges than the second generation singers. The best interpretation of the night was "El Me Mintio" by Myriam and Erika (winners of the first and second generations, accordingly) who would go on to become finalists and lead successful solo careers.
- Concert 3- The third concert was characterized by the elimination of most of what was left of the second generation, as six of the remaining eleven artists were eliminated (Andrea, Ana Lucía, Alejandra, Adrián, Azeneth and Enrique). 11 singers of the first generation still remained.
- Concert 4- María Inés (1st Generation) who had sung "7 de Septiembre", by Mecano, and received fairly good critics was eliminated.
- Concert 5- Víctor, winner of the 2nd place in the first generation, and one of the favorites in the competition decided to quit, as medical reasons disabled him to continue in the competition.
- Concert 6- The elimination of Fredi, finalist in the second generation, left only four second generation singers left in the competition.
- Concert 7- Manuel, third place in the second generation, was eliminated.
- Concert 8- The eight concert saw once again the elimination of a second generation finalist, this time it was Rosalía, who had already surpassed expectations after beating Manuel and Fredi, both of which had received a better place in the second generation finale.
- Concert 9- Once again, a finalist of La academia 2 was eliminated, this time Marco, runner-up in the Academia 2 finale.
- Concert 10- Concert 10 was full of expectation as most fans believed Erika, the only second generation singer left in the competition, would be eliminated, however it was Héctor, last place in the original Academia, who was eliminated.
- Concert 11- Shocking results took place in the eleventh concert as Miguel Ángel, third place in the first Academia, was ousted by the other eight singers.
- Concert 12- Laura, 9th place in the original Academia, and initially one of the public's favorites, lost support and was eliminated.
- Concert 13- Toñita, who missed out at the last moment in becoming one of the finalists in the first Academia, again, was eliminated at the last moment.
- Concert 14- Raúl, another first generation singer and one of the favorites to reach the finale was eliminated in a very close competition. This left four Academia 1 singers and 1 Academia 2 singers in the finale.

=== Finale ===
The finale, which was broadcast live from Monterrey, Nuevo León, was a clear display of the full potential of the network, which garnished better results than the program in the competing network, the Mexican version of Big Brother. The rating was far superior for the Desafío and caused major changes in Televisa. At the end, after singing songs from their albums, as well as new, classic Latin songs, Yahir took the night and beat out Myriam, the public's clear favorite, who was also ousted by Nadia, winner of the second place.

== Desafío de Estrellas 2006 ==
- Participants - 32

(finale June 25, 2006)

- Winner - Toñita (La Academia 1)
- Runner-Up - Erasmo (La Academia 4)
- Third Place - Raúl (La Academia 1)

Some time after the end of the 4th version of La Academia, and in order to compete with Televisa's highly successful Cantando por un sueño (Singing for A Dream), TV Azteca announced the production of a new version of the Desafío. This time, however, not only would the competition be between former Academia singers, but also with artists released in the late 90s by the network. The 2006 version of the Desafío was less successful than the first, mostly because of the competition and high ratings of Cantando por un Sueño of Televisa. To increase ratings and, therefore, revenues, the network tried implementing new mechanics into the show. For example, in every show the judges were to choose "the best singer of the night", who would win 30,000 pesos (approximately twenty-nine hundred dollars), also, for six concerts the judges were to choose one singer who would be a participant of a grand concert in the Metropolitan, one of the most important auditoriums in the country.

Controversy arose after the judges eliminated Yuridia, the clear favorite to win, because she did not appear in Concert 8. Several sources of the Mexican media and some shows, especially from Televisa, claimed the producers planned the whole thing to improve ratings for the show. Bad rumors about the Desafío also arose when Jolette, controversial former Academia participant, claimed Cynthia, attractive Desafío participant, was being supported by one of the producers, who prevented her elimination from the competition. (Cynthia was eliminated before the final round, she was not one of the final six contestants. Cynthia organized a concert to benefit the families of miners killed in an accident in Coahuila. Many of the top contestants of Desafío de Estrellas participated, and Cynthia was able to donate ten thousand pesos each to every family who lost a loved one in the disaster.)

=== Contestants ===
Name	Original Series	Eliminated
Antonia	La Academia 1	Winner
Erasmo	La Academia 4	Episode 25 (2nd)
Raul	La Academia 1	Episode 25 (3rd)
Aranza	No academica	
Adrian Varela	La Academia 4	Episode 25
Carlos Rivera	La Academia 3	Episode 25
Cynthia	La Academia 4	Episode 23
Miguel Angel	La Academia 1	Episode 20
Nadia	La Academia 1	Episode 14
Estrella	La Academia 1	Episode 13
Erika	La Academia 2	Episode 10
Yuridia	La Academia 4	Episode 8 (Quit)
Edgar	La Academia 4	Episode 7
Jose Luis	La Academia 4	Episode 6
Dulce	La Academia 3	Episode 5
Laticia	La Academia 3	Episode 5
Marco	La Academia 4	Episode 4
Manuel	La Academia 2	Episode 4
Jose Antonio	La Academia 1	Episode 4
Melissa	La Academia 3	Episode 3
Silvia	La Academia 4	Episode 3
Paula	La Academia 4	Episode 3
Cesar	La Academia 3	Episode 2
Rosalia	La Academia 2	Episode 2

=== Concerts ===
Throughout 25 concerts, the first one airing on January 8, 2006, 32 contestants (being Yuridia the favorite) competed to become one of the 6 finalists who would compete for a grand prize of three million pesos (300,000 dollars). In these concerts, three participants were chosen three times as the best singer of the night, Adrián, Aranza, and Erasmo Catarino. Also, six participants were chosen for a major concert in The Metropolitan, an important auditorium in Mexico City: Erasmo Catarino, Cynthia, Estrella, Miguel Ángel, Aranza and Raúl.

- Concert 1- January 8, 2006
  - Eliminated- None
- Concert 2- January 15, 2006
  - Eliminated- Rosalía (2003 Version Participant), Cesar, Cecilia
- Concert 3- January 22, 2006
  - Eliminated- Melissa, Sylvia, Paula
- Concert 4- January 29, 2006
  - Eliminated- Marco, Manuel (2003 Version Participant), José Antonio (2003 Version Participant)
- Concert 5- February 5, 2006
  - Eliminated- Aline, Leticia, Dulce, Claudia Pelayo, Tony Sánchez
- Concert 6- February 12, 2006
  - Eliminated- José Luis
- Concert 7- February 19, 2006
  - Eliminated- Edgar
- Concert 8- February 26, 2006
  - Eliminated- Yuridia
  - Chosen for Concert- Erasmo Catarino
- Concert 9- March 5, 2006
  - Eliminated- José Luis Graterol (from Musical group UFF)
  - Singer of the Night- Miguel Ángel (2003 Version Participant)
- Concert 10- March 12, 2006
  - Eliminated- Erika (2003 Version 4th place)
  - Singer of the Night- Erika
  - Chosen for Concert- Cynthia
- Concert 11- March 19, 2006
  - Eliminated- Benjamín
  - Singer of the Night- Carlos
  - Chosen for Concert- Estrella (2003 Version 5th Place)
- Concert 12- March 26, 2006
  - Eliminated- None
  - Singer of the Night- Estrella
  - Chosen for Concert- Miguel Ángel
- Concert 13- April 2, 2006
  - Eliminated- Estrella
  - Singer of the Night- Nadia(2003 Version 2nd Place)
  - Chosen for Concert- Raúl (2003 Version Participant)
- Concert 14- April 9, 2006
  - Eliminated- Nadia
  - Singer of the Night- Adrián
- Concert 15- April 16, 2006
  - Eliminated- None (Jose Joel Chosen Worst Singer of the night)
  - Singer of the Night- Aranza
- Concert 16- April 23, 2006
  - Eliminated- Jose Joel
  - Singer of the Night- Cynthia
- Concert 17- April 30, 2006 Special concert, with no eliminations, because of Children's Day, very special in Mexican culture and in which every artist sung with their "kid double", a child look-alike with high vocal capacity.
  - Eliminated- None
  - Singer of the Night- Aranza
- Concert 18- May 7, 2006
  - Eliminated- Alejandra Ley
  - Singer of the Night- Aranza
- Concert 19- May 14, 2006
  - Eliminated- None
  - Singer of the Night- Raúl
  - Singer of the Night (Ranchera Song)- Adrián
- Concert 20- May 21, 2006
  - Eliminated- Miguel Ángel
  - Singer of the Night- Erasmo Catarino
- Concert 21- May 28, 2006
  - Eliminated- None
- Concert 22- June 4, 2006
  - Eliminated- Adrián
  - Singer of the Night- Erasmo Catarino
- Concert 23- June 11, 2006
  - Eliminated- Cynthia
- Concert 24- June 18, 2006 Special concert in which 5 of the eliminated singers would compete to become the 6th finalist in the finale. Jose Joel, at the last moment, retired from the competition. Therefore, only four artists: Alejandra, Cynthia, Miguel Ángel and Adrián would compete in the 24th concert.
  - Eliminated- Ale Ley, Cynthia, and Miguel Ángel, eliminated in previous concerts, who were competing for a place in the finale
  - 6th Finalist- Adrián, became the 6th finalist in of the Desafío finale.
  - Best Singer of the Night- Erasmo Catarino

=== Finale ===
The Desafío de Estrellas finale took place on June 25, 2006, with the final five participants competing to win the grand prize: Antonia Salazar (Toñita), who did not make it to the finale on La Academia 1 or the Desafío 2003,Erasmo Catarino, winner of La Academia 4, Raúl, who did not make it to the finale on La Academia 1 or the Desafío 2003, Carlos, La Academia 3 winner, Adrián, third place in La Academia 4 and Aranza, the only non-Academia participant left in the competition. After singing two songs each (their best song throughout the competition and a new song), and after a close competition between the six finalists, the results were revealed:

- Raúl Sandoval received the third place prize.
- Erasmo Catarino was chosen by the public as the runner-up.
- Toñita was chosen by the public as the winner.

This Desafío finale was not as successful as that of the 2003 version because of the competition with the rival channel's show, Cantando por un Sueño...Reyes de La Cancion (Singing for A Dream...Kings of the Song).

The Third Desafío de Estrellas has been announced to premiere on April 19, 2009, Rafael Araneda From La Academia Ultima Generación will host the third edition the show will be called "El Gran Desafío."

== El Gran Desafío de Estrellas ==
- Participants - 50
- Winner - Fabiola (La Academia 6)
- Runner-Up - Myriam (La Academia 1)
- Third Place - Samuel (La Academia 5)

The 2009 version of the Desafío de Estrellas was producer by Eva Borja and counts with 50 artist

=== Concerts ===
The next table shows only contestants from la academia

Name	Original Series	Eliminated
Fabiola Rodas	La Academia 6	Winner
Myriam	La Academia 1	Episode 14 (2nd)
Samuel	La Academia 5	Episode 14 (3rd)
Nadia	La Academia 1	Episode 14 (5th)
Luis Armando	La Academia 6	Episode 12
Miguel Angel	La Academia 1	Episode 12
Cynthia	La Academia 4	Episode 10
Erika	La Academia 2	Episode 9
Estrella	La Academia 1	Episode 9
Maria Fernanda	La Academia 6	Episode 8
Valeria	La Academia 6	Episode 8
Alex Garza	La Academia 6	Episode 8
Fatima	La Academia 6	Episode 8
Jackie	La Academia 6	Episode 8
Perla	La Academia 6	Episode 8
Marco	La Academia 4	Episode 8
Fredy	La Academia 2	Episode 8
Rosalia Leon	La Academia 2	Episode 8
Matias Aranda	La Academia 6	Episode 7
Hector Silva	La Academia 6	Episode 7
Ivan Estrada	La Academia 6	Episode 7
Gerardo	La Academia 6	Episode 7
Toñita	La Academia 1	Episode 6
Erasmo	La Academia 4	Episode 6
Edgar Guerrero	La Academia 4	Episode 6
Colette	La Academia 5	Episode 5
Raul Sandoval	La Academia 1	Episode 2
Erick Sandoval	La Academia 9*	Episode 2
Cesar Robles	La Academia 3	Episode 1
Yazmin	La Academia 5	Episode 1
Vince	La Academia 5	Episode 1
Adrian Varela	La Academia 4	Episode 1
Silvia	La Academia 4	Episode 1

- Two Years Later Erick Sandoval became Season 9 Winner

Colette, Atala, Travieso, Juan Rivera, Toñita, Erasmo, Cynthia, Jorge, G6, Luis Armando, Ivone Montero, Las Reinas, Raúl Sandoval, La Posta and others were the original cast, but during the concert seven, eight new contestestants were added – some like Myriam, Nadia, Fabiola, Banda Mix, Miguel Ángel, Aline Hernández.
