= Xalpatláhuac =

City in the Mexican state of Guerrero

- Municipal seat and city
- Location within Guerrero Location within Mexico
- Coordinates: 17°28′N 98°37′W
- Country: Mexico
- State: Guerrero
- Municipality: Xalpatláhuac
- Time zone: UTC-6 (Zona Centro)

Xalpatláhuac is a city and seat of the municipality of Xalpatláhuac, in the state of Guerrero, southern Mexico.

== Notable people ==
- Erasmo Catarino, a professor and a singer
