= Myriam (Myriam album) =

Studio album by Myriam
- Released: July 2004
- Recorded: 2003
- Genre: Pop
- Length: 41:11
- Label: EMI

Myriam chronology
Una Mujer (2002)	Myriam (2004)	Vete de Aqui (2004)

Myriam is the second studio album by Myriam. On her website it is also called "Myriam: Lo que Soy, lo que Pretendo y lo que Fui" (Myriam: What I Am, What I Pretend and What I Was) making reference to the lyrics of the album's first single "Hasta El Limite". It includes eleven songs with the collaboration of Tiziano Ferro, Leonel (ex Sin Bandera). Again Myriam co-wrote a song along with Estrella. In this album Myriam brought a more fresh concept, almost 100% pop genre with a little touches of flamenco. It was released in July, 2004.

== Album information ==
It was recorded in Argentina and the producer was Cachorro López who had also worked with Julieta Venegas. Myriam's career was at a low point, as she was being criticized for her third place in Desafio de Estrellas, but all that was eclipsed by the success of this album. "Hasta el Limite" was the first single from the album; it was Myriam's first song with a promotional video, and stayed in the charts for more than 6 months. The second single was "Porque Soy Mujer" which was written by Myriam and her ex-classmate Estrella.

The album was a commercial success. Within two weeks of the launch date it reached gold status in Mexico, and sold more than 200,000 copies certificating 2× Platinum. The album was a Latin success in USA selling gold status, 50,000 copies.

== Track listing ==
#	Title	Time
1.	"Es Difícil" (It is hard); Writers: Mauricio Arriaga	3:22
2.	"Hasta El Límite" (Until the limit); Writers: Cynthia Cuevas	4:04
3.	"Mi Despedida" (My Goodbye); Writers: Cachorro López / Sebastián Schön	3:04
4.	"Me Muero De Amor" (I die for your love); Writers: Claudia Brant / Coti Sorokin	3:42
5.	"Nada Para ti" (Nothing for you); Writers: Cachorro López / Sebastián Schön	2:44
6.	"Porque Soy Mujer" (Because I am a woman); Writers: Myriam / Estrella	2:56
7.	"Regresa" (Return); Writers: Janette Chao	3:14
8.	"Inevitable" (ft. Luciano Pereyra) (Inevitable); Writers: Janette Chao	3:39
9.	"Enamorada De ti" (Your Problem); Writers: Raúl Del Sol	3:32
10.	"Tú" (You); Writers: Leonel García	3:06
11.	"Dime Tú" (Tell me); Writers: Tiziano Ferro	3:55
