= Vuelve a mí =

- Genre: Drama
- Created by: Sergio Mendoza; Amaris Paez
- Written by: Sergio Mendoza; Christian Jiménez; Gustavo Bracco; Neida Padilla
- Directed by: Danny Gavidia; Felipe Aguilar; Uandari Gómez; Melanie D'Andrea
- Starring: William Levy; Samadhi Zendejas
- Theme music composer: Jorge Avendaño Lührs
- Opening theme: "Vuelve a mí" by Claudia Sierra
- Composer: Joaquín Fernández
- Country of origin: United States
- Original language: Spanish
- No. of seasons: 1
- No. of episodes: 91

Production
- Executive producers: William Levy; Karen Barroeta; Elizabeth Suarez
- Producer: Minu Chacin
- Editor: Laura Palottini
- Production company: Telemundo Global Studios

Original release
- Network: Telemundo
- Release: 9 October 2023 – 16 February 2024

Vuelve a mí is an American television series created by Sergio Mendoza and Amaris Paez. It aired on Telemundo from 9 October 2023 to 16 February 2024. It stars William Levy and Samadhi Zendejas.

== Cast ==
=== Main ===
- William Levy as Santiago Zepeda: The eldest son of the Zepeda family from his father's late first wife. A former prisoner who spent five years in jail for a crime he did not commit, Santiago seeks to confront those who framed him in order to clear his name.
- Samadhi Zendejas as Nuria García: A hardworking Mexican woman from Ciudad Juárez who is a loving single mother to her only child, Andrés. Nuria becomes devastated over the disappearance of her son, until she finds a reason to live when she meets Santiago.
- Kimberly Dos Ramos as Liana Corrales: A strong and perfectionist woman with a dark past. Liana is an adopted member of the Zepeda family who is one of the executives at the Grupo Zepeda corporation.
- Ximena Herrera as Amelia San Román: Braulio's wealthy wife who owns a children's foundation called Fundación San Román. Amelia legally adopted Juanito into her family and develops a relationship with Diego.
- Ferdinando Valencia as Braulio Zepeda: Roberto's ambitious youngest son from his second wife, Martha. Braulio is Santiago's half-brother, Amelia's husband, and Nuria's ex-boyfriend, who is one of the executives at Grupo Zepeda.
- Rodolfo Salas as Fausto Meléndez: A criminal thug and Consuelo's boyfriend who masterminded the kidnapping of Andrés. Fausto is capable of preventing Consuelo from telling the truth about Andrés' disappearance.
- Christian de la Campa as Diego Carranza: A responsible, kind, and noble man who saved Andrés' life and formed a parental bond with him. Diego becomes an art teacher at Fundación San Román and falls in love with Amelia.
- Laura Flores as Martha Guevara: Roberto's second wife, Braulio's mother, Santiago's step-mother, and Amelia's mother-in-law.
- Geraldine Galván as Consuelo García: Nuria's younger sister who witnessed the kidnapping of her nephew, Andrés. Consuelo was in love with Fausto until she discovers the truth and becomes a victim of blackmail and abuse.
- Amaranta Ruíz as Rosalía García: Nuria and Consuelo's aunt and Eugenia's mother, who lives in a boarding house in Mexico City.
- Christian Ramos as Jeremías Montejo "El Chalo": One of the tenants at the boarding house in Mexico City, and Nuria's neighborhood friend. Chalo is also seeking justice for his sister, Esmeralda.
- Anna Sobero as Aída Jiménez: A housekeeper for the Zepeda family and Martha's best friend.
- Anthony Álvarez as Isidro Sánchez "El Tigre": Braulio's bodyguard and confidant, who has been plotting his revenge against the Zepeda family.
- Eduardo Ibarrola as Raymundo: One of the tenants at the boarding house in Mexico City, who develops a romantic relationship with Rosalía.
- Ariana Saavedra as Eugenia López: Nuria and Consuelo's cousin and Rosalía's daughter who dreams of becoming a fashion designer. Eugenia is also in love with Chalo.
- Diego Klein as Jacinto Bermúdez: An honest police officer in Ciudad Juárez, and Nuria and Consuelo's childhood friend. Jacinto also has genuine feelings for Consuelo.
- Leonardo Daniel as José María Mercado "El Chema": Santiago's prisonmate and Violeta's father.
- Fernando Ciangherotti as Roberto Zepeda: The patriarch of the Zepeda family and the president of the Grupo Zepeda corporation.
- André Sebastián as Andrés García / Juanito Zepeda: Nuria's seven-year-old son, who was kidnapped by Fausto and later loses his memories in an accident. He forms a close bond with Diego and becomes an adopted son of the Zepeda family.

=== Recurring and guest stars ===
- Jorge Luis Pila as Alberto Robles: Santiago's best friend and trusted ally, who also works as a lawyer.
- Víctor Cámara as Mariano Salas: Martha's former lover and Cassandra's biological father.
- Juan Pablo Llano as Gregorio Fernández "El Sapo": The ruthless leader of the Bajío Cartel.
- Carlos Mata as Valentín San Román: Amelia's father, who is a business partner of the Zepeda family.
- Jéssica Cediel as Celia Suárez: Diego's ex-wife and Danita's mother.
- Denisse Novoa as Carmencita: Raymundo's daughter, who develops feelings for Eugenia.
- Emma Mizrahi as Mia Castel: Liana's best friend and personal assistant.

== Production ==
On 25 January 2023, the series was announced at the 2023 Content Americas event with the working title Hasta encontrarte. On 11 May 2023, the series was presented at Telemundo's upfront for the 2023–2024 television season, with Vuelve a mí being announced as the official title. On 18 May 2023, an extensive cast list was published in a press release. Filming of the series began on 22 May 2023. The first teaser was released on 11 August 2023. The series premiered on 9 October 2023.

== Episodes ==
No.	Title	Original release date	U.S. viewers (millions)
1	"El hijo que perdí"	9 October 2023	0.74
2	"Te encontré"	10 October 2023	0.72
3	"La verdad de Braulio"	11 October 2023	0.61
4	"La despedida"	12 October 2023	0.65
5	"La mentira crece"	13 October 2023	0.61
6	"Amelia conoce a Andrés"	16 October 2023	0.73
7	"Caballo de Troya"	17 October 2023	0.78
8	"Nuevos comienzos"	18 October 2023	0.75
9	"Segundas oportunidades"	19 October 2023	0.77
10	"El cordero resultó ser un lobo"	20 October 2023	0.68
11	"Poderoso caballero es Don Dinero"	23 October 2023	0.79
12	"El ángel que me salvó"	24 October 2023	0.79
13	"La traición de Diego"	25 October 2023	0.80
14	"Lucero"	26 October 2023	0.76
15	"La vida sigue"	27 October 2023	0.68
16	"Andrés encuentra una familia"	30 October 2023	0.64
17	"Roberto descubre la verdad"	31 October 2023	0.71
18	"La decepción"	1 November 2023	0.76
19	"Cría cuervos"	2 November 2023	0.72
20	"Deuda cobrada"	3 November 2023	0.68
21	"La hora del matriarcado"	6 November 2023	0.85
22	"Mr. presidente"	7 November 2023	0.93
23	"La esposa"	8 November 2023	0.77
24	"¿Quién es Santiago?"	9 November 2023	0.82
25	"Braulio encuentra a Nuria"	10 November 2023	0.89
26	"Tenemos que hablar"	13 November 2023	0.88
27	"La obsesión de Liana"	14 November 2023	0.88
28	"Amelia se acerca a la verdad"	15 November 2023	0.93
29	"Andrés es ahora un Zepeda"	17 November 2023	0.86
30	"El triunfo de Liana"	20 November 2023	0.95
31	"Nuria entre dos hermanos"	21 November 2023	0.68
32	"El final de Nuria y Santiago"	22 November 2023	0.98
33	"Las dudas de Amelia"	24 November 2023	0.85
34	"Celos, malditos celos"	27 November 2023	0.78
35	"Amelia abre los ojos"	28 November 2023	1.01
36	"La pelea"	29 November 2023	0.88
37	"El sueño de Andrés"	30 November 2023	0.91
38	"Martha conoce a su hija"	1 December 2023	0.89
39	"La venganza de Braulio"	4 December 2023	0.89
40	"No se la lleven"	5 December 2023	0.79
41	"Adiós Tania"	6 December 2023	0.91
42	"La libertad de Nuria"	7 December 2023	0.88
43	"Nuria no se queda atrás"	8 December 2023	0.83
44	"Mi hijo vive"	11 December 2023	1.00
45	"Fabián despierta"	12 December 2023	0.86
46	"Telas podridas"	13 December 2023	0.94
47	"La pulserita de Andrés"	14 December 2023	1.09
48	"Calladitas no nos vemos más bonitas"	15 December 2023	0.85
49	"El Sapo"	18 December 2023	0.94
50	"Santiago se acerca a la verdad"	19 December 2023	0.93
51	"Juego de poder"	20 December 2023	0.87
52	"El principio del fin"	21 December 2023	0.96
53	"Las costuras de Braulio"	22 December 2023	N/A
54	"Se derrumba la familia"	25 December 2023	N/A
55	"El presentimiento de Nuria"	26 December 2023	N/A
56	"¿Qué tiene que ver Consuelo?"	27 December 2023	N/A
57	"Santiago descubre la verdad"	28 December 2023	N/A
58	"Bomba de Tiempo"	1 January 2024	0.84
59	"La emboscada"	2 January 2024	0.97
60	"La venganza de Liana"	3 January 2024	0.93
61	"Yo sé dónde está tu hijo"	4 January 2024	0.96
62	"¿Quién es usted?"	5 January 2024	0.97
63	"Que te perdone Dios"	8 January 2024	0.98
64	"Voy a recuperar a mi hijo"	9 January 2024	0.91
65	"Yo soy tu madre"	10 January 2024	0.96
66	"La hora del Sapo"	11 January 2024	0.98
67	"Madre solo hay una"	12 January 2024	1.05
68	"El derrumbe de Braulio"	15 January 2024	1.12
69	"Se quiebra la familia"	16 January 2024	1.08
70	"No te quiero volver a ver"	17 January 2024	0.94
71	"Salven a Consuelo"	18 January 2024	0.93
72	"Hermanas para siempre"	19 January 2024	1.01
73	"El juicio"	22 January 2024	0.81
74	"La decisión del juez"	23 January 2024	0.84
75	"Aída"	24 January 2024	0.99
76	"El adiós"	25 January 2024	0.98
77	"Vas a estar bien"	26 January 2024	0.88
78	"El Tigre"	29 January 2024	0.98
79	"Mentiras, muertos y engaños"	30 January 2024	0.94
80	"Otra vez no"	31 January 2024	1.02
81	"La prueba"	1 February 2024	0.98
82	"Imposición"	2 February 2024	1.01
83	"Descubrimientos y decisiones"	5 February 2024	1.02
84	"El sacrificio de Nuria"	6 February 2024	0.95
85	"La última noche"	7 February 2024	1.20
86	"El dolor de una madre"	8 February 2024	1.10
87	"Caín y Abel"	9 February 2024	0.94
88	"Fuego que purifica"	12 February 2024	1.11
89	"Una familia a la fuerza"	14 February 2024	0.91
90	"En manos de un criminal"	15 February 2024	1.10
91	"Siempre juntos"	16 February 2024	1.16

== Reception ==
=== Ratings ===
Viewership and ratings per season of Vuelve a mí
Season	Timeslot (ET)	Episodes	First aired		Last aired		Avg. viewers (millions)
Season	Timeslot (ET)	Episodes	Date	Viewers (millions)	Date	Viewers (millions)	Avg. viewers (millions)
1	Mon–Fri 9:00 p.m.	86	9 October 2023	0.74	16 February 2024	1.16	0.89

=== Awards and nominations ===
Year	Award	Category	Nominated	Result	Ref
2024	Produ Awards	Best Telenovela	Vuelve a mí	Nominated	
2024	Produ Awards	Best Lead Actress - Telenovela	Samadhi Zendejas	Nominated	
2024	Produ Awards	Best Lead Actor - Telenovela	William Levy	Nominated	
2024	Produ Awards	Best Screenplay - Superseries or Telenovela	Sergio Mendoza & Amaris Paez	Nominated	
