= Erasmo Catarino =

Mexican musician and politician

Erasmo Catarino González Bernal (born November 25, 1977) is a Mexican singer and politician; the first-place winner on the popular Mexican television show La Academia 4 (2005). He was selected as the winner by the public.

== Early life ==
Erasmo Catarino González Bernal was born in Xalpatláhuac, Guerrero, in 1977. He is an indigenous Nahuatl and speaks the Nahuatl language fluently. He is married to Karla Sandoval. Before entering La Academia, González was a schoolteacher, teaching second grade in a primary school for Nahuatl children in Xalpatlahuac, Guerrero. He studied elementary education in Puebla, Puebla, and received his teaching degree there.

== Success ==
Since he appeared on La Academia he has performed in several genres, but prefers "rancheras" especially. On July 3, 2005 he became the winner of the fourth Generation.

He competed on the Mexican television program Desafío de Estrellas (2006), in which 32 of the best young Mexican singers vied for the top spot and three million pesos. Erasmo won second place; first place went to Toñita, a singer from Veracruz, from La Academia 1. His first album, "Erasmo: El Conde de Xalpatlahuac" was released in December 2005 selling more than 100,000 copies. His second album, "A Toda Banda", went on sale in mid-2006, achieving gold status weeks after the release. On June 26, 2007 Erasmo released his third album which consists of six covers and six new songs.

He is one of the few alumni from La Academia to win a muse from Premios Oye! alongside Nadia, Yahir, Yuridia and Víctor.

== Political career ==
González Bernal contended in the 2024 Mexican general election as the alternate of Luis Armando Melgar Bravo, who was elected to the Senate for the state of Chiapas on the Ecologist Green Party of Mexico (PVEM) ticket.

On 26 June 2025, after Melgar Bravo requested a four-day leave of absence from his congressional duties, González Bernal was sworn in as a senator.

== Discography ==
=== Albums ===
.

Year	Album	
2005	Erasmo: El Conde’’	A Toda Banda
2007	Por un Amor	
2012	Solo Por Ella	

=== Singles ===
Year	Song	Album
2005	Apple Three	Erasmo: El Conde de Xalpatlahuac
2005	Mi baquita marina	Erasmo: El Conde de Xalpatlahuac
2006	Qué rica está la manzana	A Toda Banda
2007	Llorarás	Por un amor
