= List of Vivir a destiempo episodes =

Vivir a Destiempo (literally: Living Untimely; official release: Timeless Love) is a Mexican telenovela produced by Fides Velasco and Jacky Castro for Azteca. It stars Edith González and Ramiro Fumazoni as the protagonists alongside Humberto Zurita, Andrea Noli and Wendy de los Cobos as the main villains. The original story and screenplay is written by Eric Vonn. From February 25 to September 20, 2013, Azteca 13 broadcast Vivir a Destiempo, replacing Los Rey.

== Episodes ==
Air Date	Number	Episode Title	Rating	Duration
February 25, 2013	001	Conoce a Paula Duarte, Rogelio Bermúdez y Alejandro Monroy	7.3	60 minutes
February 26, 2013	002	Paula se enfrentará a su madre por los maltratos que no soporta	6.6	54 minutes
February 27, 2013	003	Paula le tiene que pedir a permiso a Rogelio que la deje trabajar	6.4	50 minutes
February 28, 2013	004	Rogelio quiere fuera de su casa a la madre de Paula y es su última palabra	6.6	47 minutes
March 1, 2013	005	Carolina tendrá un enfrentamiento con Rogelio que pondrá en peligro su vida	6.6	48 minutes
March 4, 2013	006	Paula y Alejandro se reencontraron, mientras que Rogelio sigue siendo infiel	7.1	48 minutes
March 5, 2013	007	Carolina chantajeará a Rogelio para no hablar sobre su relación con Sonia	6.8	43 minutes
March 6, 2013	008	Rogelio cree que Paula tiene una aventura	7.0	43 minutes
March 7, 2013	009	Paula cree que Carolina y Rogelio le ocultan algo	6.9	43 minutes
March 8, 2013	010	Rogelio tiene un plan para ocultar su relación con Sonia y reconquistar a Paula	6.1	43 minutes
March 11, 2013	011	Alejandro le robó un beso a Paula, pero ella no puede dejarse llevar	6.0	43 minutes
March 12, 2013	012	Paula sentirá remordimientos por sentir algo por Alejandro	7.1	43 minutes
March 13, 2013	013	Carolina le contará a Alejando sobre Paula y su pasado con Rogelio	6.7	41 minutes
March 14, 2013	014	Paula se enterará de un ecreto de su hija Tatiana	6.5	42 minutes
March 15, 2013	015	Paula no puede creer que su hija esté ingiriendo sustancias prohibidas	6.8	41 minutes
March 18, 2013	016	Paula enfrentará a Tania con la prueba en su mano	N/A	43 minutes
March 19, 2013	017	Paula se dio cuenta de la clase de persona que es su hija Tania	6.8	43 minutes
March 20, 2013	018	Alejandro acepta que Paula fue el gran amor de su vida	6.8	42 minutes
March 21, 2013	019	Amparo y Paula por fin se conocerán	6.7	41 minutes
March 22, 2013	020	Alejandro le pedirá a Paula que deje a Rogelio para que estén juntos	N/A	43 minutes
March 25, 2013	021	Sonia reconocerá ante Salvador que fue una mala mujer en el pasado	6.7	43 minutes
March 26, 2013	022	Rogelio sospecha que Paula está saliendo con alguien más	5.8	43 minutes
March 27, 2013	023	Se sabrán muchos secretos que sorprenderán a muchos	6.2	43 minutes
March 28, 2013	024	Cierre de semana, conoce lo más impactante de Vivir a destiempo	5.1	43 minutes
March 29, 2013	025	Cierre de semana, conoce lo más impactante de Vivir a destiempo	6.4	43 minutes
April 1, 2013	026	Rogelio golpeó a Eduardo sin previo aviso	6.4	41 minutes
April 2, 2013	027	Paula se disculpó con Alejando y Salvador enfrentará a Sonia	6.4	41 minutes
April 3, 2013	028	Rogelio se fue de la casa y Tania quiere irse con él	6.2	41 minutes
April 4, 2013	029	Rogelio se salió con la suya, Carolina irá a parar al psiquiátrico	6.8	41 minutes
April 5, 2013	030	Carolina ya no reconocerá a su familia y será internada para siempre	7.1	41 minutes
April 8, 2013	031	¿Qué pasará ahora que Tania sabe de la relación que tiene su padre con Sonia?	7.6	41 minutes
April 9, 2013	032	Tania se atrevió a besar a Alejandro para saber quién era mejor si él o su hijo	7.6	41 minutes
April 10, 2013	033	Eduardo no puede creer las mentiras que está inventando Tania sobre su papá	6.9	41 minutes
April 11, 2013	034	Rogelio no se dentendrá hasta mandar a su suegra al asilo	7.1	39 minutes
April 12, 2013	035	Rogelio golpeó a Paula y ahora Alejandro la ayudará	7.4	39 minutes
April 15, 2013	036	Paula fue brutalmente golpeada por Rogelio y Alejandro la ayudará. Sonia es informada y le avisa a Rogelio que le entregó a Paula en bandeja de plata.	7.6	41 minutes
April 16, 2013	037	Paula se da cuenta de que no puede contar con su hija. Por su parte, Rogelio se molesta con Daniel.	8.0	40 minutes
April 17, 2013	038	Paula y Alejandro comienzan a formalizar su relación	7.7	42 minutes
April 18, 2013	039	Alejandro visita a Rogelio en la cárcel para dejarle claras las cosas.	8.5	40 minutes
April 19, 2013	040	Paula no sabe que decisión tomar y pide consejo a sus hijos.	6.9	40 minutes
April 22, 2013	041	Paula no sabe si liberar a Rogelio después de sus amenazas	7.4	42 minutes
April 23, 2013	042	Tania regresó con Eduardo pero Alejandro no está de acuerdo	7.4	42 minutes
April 24, 2013	043	Alejandro le pedirá a Paula que su hija deje en paz a Eduardo	7.6	40 minutes
April 25, 2013	044	Tania se enfrentó con su mejor amiga y con su suegra	7.0	40 minutes
April 26, 2013	045	Alejandro le dirá a Tania que es una chava muy enferma y ella lo amenazará	7.1	42 minutes
April 29, 2013	046	Alejandro le dice a Paula que su hija tiene un problema psicológico y necesita ayuda	7.1	43 minutes
April 30, 2013	047	¿Qué pasará con Tania ahora que Paula la corrió de su casa?	8.1	44 minutes
May 1, 2013	048	Alejandro y Paula ya no pueden ocultar el amor que sienten	7.8	44 minutes
May 2, 2013	049	Tania ya no podrá seguir mintiéndole a Eduardo	8.3	42 minutes
May 3, 2013	050	Paula descubrió la infidelidad de Sonia con Rogelio	6.7	44 minutes
May 6, 2013	051	Paula no perdonará el engaño de su hermana y Rogelio la amenazó	8.0	42 minutes
May 7, 2013	052	Paula le reclamará a Tania el no haberle dicho sobre la relación de Sonia y Rogelio	7.7	42 minutes
May 8, 2013	053	Rogelio golpeó a Daniel por decirle que le da asco	7.3	42 minutes
May 9, 2013	054	Paula recibe amenazas de su hija por estar con Alejandro	7.0	42 minutes
May 10, 2013	055	¿Martín tuvo que entregarle los documentos de Carolina a Paula?	6.5	41 minutes
May 13, 2013	056	Tania estuvo al borde de la muerte por chantajear a su mamá	8.2	50 minutes
May 14, 2013	057	Julio le dirá a Sonia que nunca la querrá como a una madre	7.7	39 minutes
May 15, 2013	058	Rogelio hará todo por salir bien librado de la demencia senil de Carolina	7.0	39 minutes
May 16, 2013	059	Tania le dice a Rogelio que está embarazada y lo sabía antes de intentar suicidarse	6.8	39 minutes
May 17, 2013	060	Rogelio le dirá a Paula que Tania está embaraza	7.1	41 minutes
May 20, 2013	061	Rogelio intentará matar a Alejandro en el hospital	7.4	41 minutes
May 21, 2013	062	Paula aceptó casarse con Alejandro e irse a vivir con él	7.5	42 minutes
May 22, 2013	063	Paula confesó que se casará con Eduardo y Tania intentó volverla a chantajear	7.5	42 minutes
May 23, 2013	064	Tania sabe de su enfermedad y no quiere atenderse	6.5	41 minutes
May 24, 2013	065	Patricio sabe que Cristina no ha ido a los intercambios de pareja, sino que fue Sonia	6.8	41 minutes
May 27, 2013	066	Tania seguirá con sus chantajes	8.0	42 minutes
May 28, 2013	067	Paula le dice a Sonia que nunca podrá olvidar su traición	7.3	42 minutes
May 29, 2013	068	Paula se enfrenta a Amparo por sus insultos	8.3	42 minutes
May 30, 2013	069	Alejandro le pide a Tania que demuestre que su hijo es de Eduardo para darle lo que le pide	8.2	41 minutes
May 31, 2013	070	¿Rogelio se vengará de Sonia después de la puñalada que le dio?	6.9	40 minutes
June 3, 2013	071	Tania está en la clínica, para tratar su bipolaridad	7.5	41 minutes
June 4, 2013	072	Eduardo quiere utilizar a Mirna sólo para estar con alguien en la cama	7.2	42 minutes
June 5, 2013	073	Paula y Alejandro se entregan al amor que sienten el uno por el otro	7.5	41 minutes
June 6, 2013	074	Cristina corrió a Patricio de su casa y Berenice sufrió un gran golpe	7.8	41 minutes
June 7, 2013	075	Amparo quiere alejar a Mirna de Alejandro porque tiene un mal presentimiento	6.4	41 minutes
June 10, 2013	076	Daniel descubrió la relación que tiene su padre con Amparo	7.3	41 minutes
June 11, 2013	077	Tania habló con Alejandro sobre sus acuerdos y la posibilidad que se entere Paula	7.7	41 minutes
June 12, 2013	078	Alejandro tiene planes de llevar a Eduardo a un grupo de ayuda de alcohólicos	7.5	41 minutes
June 13, 2013	079	Mirna no quiere perder al hijo de Eduardo	7.6	41 minutes
June 14, 2013	080	Cristina no aceptará más intercambiar parejas	7.2	42 minutes
June 17, 2013	081	¿Rogelio estalla al saber que Tania no quiere apoyarlo?	6.8	41 minutes
June 18, 2013	082	Amparo no permitirá que Mirna tenga un hijo a Eduardo	7.8	41 minutes
June 19, 2013	083	Rogelio amenaza a Eduardo para que se case con Tania	7.9	41 minutes
June 20, 2013	084	Sonia se acuesta con Patricio por vengarse de Cristina	7.9	40 minutes
June 21, 2013	085	Amparo está entre la espada y la pared	7.6	40 minutes
June 24, 2013	086	Patricio le deja ver a Rogelio que ya sabe su trato de la otra agencia	7.5	40 minutes
June 25, 2013	087	Patricio se reconcilia con Rogelio y está tramando algo	7.0	41 minutes
June 26, 2013	088	Tania y Eduardo vuelven a estar juntos, pero él planea su venganza	8.1	40 minutes
June 27, 2013	089	Alejandro le llama a Mirna para decirle que no necesita nada de él	7.9	41 minutes
June 28, 2013	090	Berenice se enteró de la clase de relación que están teniendo sus papás	7.3	41 minutes
July 1, 2013	091	Cristina se enfrenta a Sonia por lo que le contó a Berenice	7.3	41 minutes
July 2, 2013	092	Patricio aceptó que estuvo con Sonia y Cristina no quiere volver a verlo	7.2	40 minutes
July 3, 2013	093	Amparo fue descubierta de la relación que sostiene con Rogelio por su hijo	7.8	41 minutes
July 4, 2013	094	Eduardo comprobó la relación que tiene su mamá con Rogelio	7.0	40 minutes
July 5, 2013	095	Cristina deja su casa porque no soporta la presencia de Patricio	7.2	41 minutes
July 8, 2013	096	Berenice le reprocha a Cristina que siendo amigas no le haya contado antes sus problemas	7.8	42 minutes
July 9, 2013	097	Tania le dice a Alejandro que se atenga a las consecuencias después de lo que pasó	7.3	42 minutes
July 10, 2013	098	Rogelio le devuelve el dinero que Alejandro le dio a Tania	7.0	41 minutes
July 11, 2013	099	Paula no piensa cancelar su boda con Alejandro por culpa de Tania y Eduardo	7.2	41 minutes
July 12, 2013	100	Cierre de semana impactante en Vivir a destiempo	7.1	42 minutes
July 15, 2013	101	Berenice está destrozada por lo que le pasó	8.3	40 minutes
July 16, 2013	102	Amparo le pide a Eduardo que se olvide que ella es su mamá	7.2	40 minutes
July 17, 2013	103	Sonia sufrió un grave accidente por culpa de Rogelio	7.7	41 minutes
July 18, 2013	104	Todos se enteran del accidente que sufrió Sonia	7.6	40 minutes
July 19, 2013	105	Rocío le dice a Berenice que piense si Tania y Marisol le hicieron daño	8.1	39 minutes
July 22, 2013	106	A Amparo se le cayó el teatrito por culpa de Rogelio	7.7	40 minutes
July 23, 2013	107	Berenice sabe que Daniel se acostó con Marisol	7.7	40 minutes
July 24, 2013	108	Tania está a punto de ser descubierta de sus mentiras junto a Marisol	7.0	42 minutes
July 25, 2013	109	¿Qué pasará ahora que Cristina sabe que Leila está embarazada?	7.8	40 minutes
July 26, 2013	110	Eduardo sigue con los planes para casarse con Tania	7.3	40 minutes
July 29, 2013	111	En tres semanas Rogelio les dará un regalo de bodas a Paula y Alejandro que no olvidarán	7.8	39 minutes
July 30, 2013	112	Paula ya no permitirá más abusos por parte de Tania y la enfrenta	8.1	41 minutes
July 31, 2013	113	Berenice estuvo a punto de decirle a Paula lo que le había pasado	7.7	40 minutes
August 1, 2013	114	Paula ya no soporta los desplantes de Tania y está furiosa	7.6	42 minutes
August 2, 2013	115	Paula renunció a Tania porque ya no puede más con sus intrigas	6.8	41 minutes
August 5, 2013	116	Eduardo dejó a Tania plantada antes de su matrimonio y ella juró vengarse	7.9	37 minutes
August 6, 2013	117	Félix tiene una discusión con Carolia y cae	8.3	39 minutes
August 7, 2013	118	Todos sufren por la muerte de Félix	8.5	40 minutes
August 8, 2013	119	¿Hasta dónde está dispuesta Tania llegar para vengarse de Mirna y Eduardo?	8.4	41 minutes
August 9, 2013	120	Tania y Eduardo sufrieron un terrible accidente	8.1	43 minutes
August 12, 2013	121	Eduardo está muy mal herido y le dice a sus padres que todo fue culpa de Tania	9.5	40 minutes
August 13, 2013	122	Eduardo ha muerto y Alejandro no querrá saber nada sobre Paula	8.7	42 minutes
August 14, 2013	123	Paula le dijo a Tania que Eduardo había muerto y su hijo también	8.5	43 minutes
August 15, 2013	124	Alejandro le pide a Paula entierre a Tania para poder ser felices	7.7	41 minutes
August 16, 2013	125	Paula tiene que alejarse para siempre de Alejandro	8.0	43 minutes
August 19, 2013	126	Alejandro vuelve a los brazos de Amparo por el dolor que ambos sienten	8.6	41 minutes
August 20, 2013	127	Tania recibe la espalda de Paula ahora que quiere salir del hospital en donde esta	8.1	42 minutes
August 21, 2013	128	Amparo habló con Paula y le dijo que está viviendo en casa de Alejandro	8.2	42 minutes
August 22, 2013	129	Martín será la salvación para Tania	8.0	42 minutes
August 23, 2013	130	Beatriz está muy preocupada por los estudios que le tienen que hacer a Julio	7.6	40 minutes
August 26, 2013	131	Paula le dice a Alejandro que no es posible que haya intimado con Amparo	8.8	37 minutes
August 27, 2013	132	Paula le dice a Alejandro que no es posible que haya intimado con Amparo	9.2	37 minutes
August 28, 2013	133	Berenice se encuentra con Marisol y recuerda perfectamente a su agresor sexual	8.4	39 minutes
August 29, 2013	134	Berenice dirá toda la verdad sobre Tania y su violación	8.7	40 minutes
August 30, 2013	135	Sonia volvió a estar con Rogelio y él le dice que es su único hombre	8.5	41 minutes
September 2, 2013	136	Julio necesita un transplante de corazón para poder vivir	8.9	40 minutes
September 3, 2013	137	Paula y Alejandro se vuelven a encontrar en el hospital	8.5	41 minutes
September 4, 2013	138	Eleonora le dijo a Rogelio que Martín y Tania son amantes	9.6	41 minutes
September 5, 2013	139	Rogelio le dice a Paula que Tania está viviendo con Martín	9.7	41 minutes
September 6, 2013	140	Julio piensa que Eduardo los está viendo y quiere decirles algo	8.3	42 minutes
September 9, 2013	141	Paula enfrenta a Tania y le dice que nadie de su familia la necesita ya	9.3	42 minutes
September 10, 2013	142	Julio le pide a Daniel que haga feliz a Berenice ahora que él morirá	9.1	39 minutes
September 11, 2013	143	Tania quiere saber qué piensa Marisol de su amistad	9.3	39 minutes
September 12, 2013	144	Rogelio le da la espalda a Tania y se olvida de que ella existe	8.9	41 minutes
September 13, 2013	145	Amparo dejará a Rogelio sin su más preciado tesoro	8.2	44 minutes
September 16, 2013	146	Rogelio se lanza de un edificio	9.2	43 minutes
September 17, 2013	147	Sonia está muerta, y todos la recuerdan por su último acto de amor	10.3	41 minutes
September 18, 2013	148	Julio sabrá que el corazón que ahora tiene es de Sonia	10.3	41 minutes
September 19, 2013	149	Tania irá a prisión por culpa de Marisol	9.9	42 minutes
September 20, 2013	150	Disfruta el capítulo final de tu telenovela Vivir a destiempo	11.0	45 minutes
