= Vivir a Destiempo (album) =

Studio album by Aranza
- Genre: Compilation/Soundtrack
- Label: TVA Publishing/Azteca Musica; Universal Music México S.A. de C.V.

Vivir a Destiempo is the eight studio album by Mexican singer Aranza featuring the titular theme from telenovela Vivir a Destiempo. It was released on August 1, 2013.

== Background ==
Vivir a Destiempo features the single "Vivir a Destiempo" as well as other popular songs by Aranza and instrumental soundtracks from the telenovela. It is also available on iTunes.
