= Mi historia en la Academia =

Mi Historia en La Academia

Compilation album by Myriam
- Released: December 2002
- Recorded: 2002
- Genre: Latin
- Length: 55:21
- Label: EMI

Myriam chronology
Mi Historia en La Academia (2002)	Una Mujer (2003)

Mi Historia en La Academia (My Story in The Academy) is the first release from Mexican singer Myriam. It is a compilation album released in December 2002 after winning the first season of the Mexican reality talent show La Academia.

== Album information ==
The album contains the songs that Myriam performed during La Academia. All of the songs had previously been released on the show-related albums that contained the songs by all contestants for each concert.

The album does not contain the songs that Myriam performed as a duet: "Believe" with Wendolee; "Suavemente" with Nadia; and "A Dios le Pido" with Victor. It also does not contain five of the six songs performed during the 3 final shows where she was already one of the finalists: "Te Quedo Grande la Yegua" and "Donde Estan" for the first semi-final; "Sombras" and "No Huyas de Mi" for the second semi-final; and "The Rose" on the final show.

The album was recorded in the small studio inside the house used for the show. Each song was recorded as part of the routine that all the contestants followed each week to perform their designated songs on the concert performed each Sunday.

== Track listing ==
#	Title	Time
1.	"Quien Como Tu" (Who Like Yourself); Writers: Ana Gabriel	3:30
2.	"Como La Flor" (Like the Flower); Writers: A. B. Quintanilla III, Pete Astudillo	4:37
3.	"Mirame" (Look at Me); Writers: Alfredo E. Matheus	3:57
4.	"Una Noche Mas" (One More Night/Waiting for Tonight); Writers: Manny Benito, Maria Christiansen, Michael Garvin, Phillip Douglas Temple	4:11
5.	"Lluvia" (Rain); Writers: Luis Angel Marquez	5:01
6.	"Mudanzas" (Moves); Writers: Sergio Vanusa	3:53
7.	"El Ultimo Adios" (The Last Goodbye); Writers: Estefano Salgado	4:14
8.	"No Me Enseñaste" (You Didn't Teach Me); Writers: Estefano, Julio Reyes	4:14
9.	"El Me Mintio" (He Lied to Me); Writers: Amanda Miguel, Diego Verdaguer, Graciela Carballo	3:44
10.	"Suerte" (Luck/Whenever, Wherever); Writers: Shakira, Timothy Mitchell	3:16
11.	"De Mi Enamorate" (Fall in Love with Me); Writers: Juan Gabriel	3:27
12.	"Te Amare" (I Will Love You); Writers: Miguel Bosé, Juan Carlos Calderon	3:34
13.	"¿Cómo te va mi amor?" (How Is It Going, My Love); Writers: Hernaldo Zúñiga	3:48
14.	"La Loca" (The Crazy); Writers: Diego Maria Luisa, Maria Teresa Diego	3:53

== Certifications ==
Mi Historia en La Academia has been certified Platinum+Gold.
