= Una Mujer (album) =

Studio album by Myriam
- Released: March 2003
- Recorded: 2003
- Genre: Latin
- Length: 45:21
- Label: EMI

Myriam chronology
Mi historia en la Academia (2002)	Una Mujer (2003)	Myriam (2004)

Una Mujer (A Woman) is the first studio album with new unreleased songs of Myriam. Before the success her debut album was a lot of composer got interested in sending songs for Myriam. Soraya, Mr. Manzanero, Claudia Brant are some of the writers that participated in this album. It was released in March 2003, the album broke all the records and expectecions everyone had.

== Album information ==
The album includes 11 unreleased songs and the remix of the song "The Rose", song that give her the 1st place on the reality. The album's genre was Latin ballad/pop. When the album was released it reach the peak of the tops in Mexico and USA. At the month the album was released it was certificated as platinum for selling more than 150,000 copies i MEX.

The album was recorded in the a studio in Mexico City, produced by Memo Gil. Also is important to mention that Gaby Cardenas who was her teacher in the reality collaborate in the album, guiding Myriam in the vocal plane.

== Track listing ==
#	Title	Time
1.	"Acostumbrame" (Get me used to); Writers: Claudia Brant/Corrinne May Ying Foo	2:57
2.	"No Lo Mereces" (You don't deserved it); Writers: Adolfo Hernández	3:18
3.	"Sin ti No Hay Nada" (Without you there is nothing); Writers: Claudia Brant	3:19
4.	"Una Mujer" (A Woman); Writers: Cristian Zalles	4:08
5.	"Si tu te me vas" (If you go away); Writers: Ferra/Ornelas	3:41
6.	"Corazon Sin Dueño" (Heart without an owner); Writers: Cristian Zalles/J. C. Pérez Soto/P. Manavello	3:30
7.	"Mi Niño" (My Child); Writers: Myriam/Estrella	3:14
8.	"Cuesta Arriba" (Reach it); Writers: Jorge Luis Piloto/Manuel López	3:40
9.	"Alla Tu" (Your Problem); Writers: Tell you later	3:46
10.	"Me Hice Mujer" (I become a woman); Writers: Armando Manzanero	3:27
11.	"Como Seria" (How would it be); Writers: Soraya	4:49
12.	"The Rose [remix]" (The rose [remix]); Writers:	5:31

=== Special Edition bonus tracks ===
Une Mujer (ed. especial)

Studio album by Myriam
- Released: 2003
- Label: EMI

1. "New Photos"
2. 9 new tracks (sang in Desafio de Estrellas) Studio Versions
3. New Cover
4. 2 New Bonus tracks
5. Prefiero Estar Sola
6. Amor Secreto

== Certifications ==
Region	Certification	Certified units/sales
Mexico (AMPROFON)	Gold	120,000
