= Bárbara Garofalo =

Venezuelan actress, model and singer

- Born: August 1992 (age 33); Venezuela
- Occupations: Actress; dancer; model
- Years active: 1995-present

Bárbara Garofalo (born August 1992) is a Venezuelan actress, dancer and former teen idol.

== Early life ==
When she was two-and-a-half years-old, Bárbara Garofalo began her career as a professional dancer in 1995. Around that time, she began to participate in runway fashion shows as a model.

== Career ==
In 1999, Garofalo starred in the Venezuelan children's film, La Aventura Magica de Oscar (Oscar's Magic Adventure). Garofalo participated in three telenovela's in 1999: Carita Pintada (Little Painted Faces), Hay Amores que Matan (Loves that Kill), and Vive la Pepa (Pepa Lives).

Garofalo made her international acting debut in 2001, when she went to Colombia to act in Mi Pequena Mama (My Small Mother). This performance paved the way for her to participate in the 2002 dramatic adult telenovela hit La Venganza (The Vengeance), which led to fame in Colombia as well. She later released a CD.

In 2003, she was asked about her future plans during a telephone interview, to which she replied, "Each one God has in His plans. I want to keep acting, [which is] my great fascination. I have been contacted [about that], but with no further concrete plans. I would love to sing. I have written a few songs, and I am working towards that goal."

== See also ==
- List of Venezuelans
