= Vete de Aqui =

Vete de Aquí

Studio album by Myriam
- Released: February 7, 2006 (Mexico)
- Recorded: 2005–2006
- Genre: Pop; Grupera
- Label: EMI Music

Myriam chronology
Myriam (2004)	Vete de Aquí (2006)	Simplemente Amigos (2007)

Vete de Aquí (Spanish for "Get out of here") is Myriam's fourth studio album, released on February 7, 2006. With this album, Myriam tried the Tex-Mex genre but it also included pop and ballad tracks. This album reached Gold status by selling more than 70,000 copies.

== Album information ==
It was recorded in Mexico City by three producers. Jorge Avendaño, Manuel Herrera and Mariano Perez, who is one of the producers encharged of the pop/ballad side of the album composed a song called "Lo que siento es amor" (What I feel is love), which is considered by a lot of experts the best ballad of Myriam, who reached a high levels of interpretation in this song. The album had 5 singles, "Vete de aqui", "Lo que siento es amor", "Negra pena", "Fuego y pasion" and "Traicionera". All five reached the Mexican Top 50 charts.

== Track listing ==
#	Title	Time
1.	"Vete de Aqui" (Go Away); Writers:	3:29
2.	"Hoy que te vas" (Now that you leave); Writers:	3:11
3.	"Fuego y Pasion" (Fire and Pasion); Writers:	4:06
4.	"Lo que siento es amor" (What I feel is love); Writers: Mariano Perez	5:02
5.	"Negra Pena" (Black Pain); Writers:	3:44
6.	"Cuando tu lo deseas" (When you desire it); Writers:	3:46
7.	"Recuerdos" (Memories); Writers:	3:57
8.	"Traicionera" (Traitor); Writers:	3:39
9.	"Perdida en otra piel" (Lost in other skin); Writers:	3:05
10.	"Desamor" (Falling apart); Writers:	4:04
11.	"Dos y un solo amor" (Two and only one love); Writers:	3:51
