= Regio corazón, alma mexicana =

Studio album by Myriam
- Released: January 2011
- Recorded: 2010
- Genre: Regional Mexican
- Length: 38:03
- Label: EMI
- Producer: Manuel Herrera Maldonado

Myriam chronology
Cambio de Piel (2008)	Regio corazón, alma mexicana (2011)	10 años (2012)

Regio corazón, alma mexicana is a studio album by Myriam, issued nearly three years after her previous album. Myriam was the winner of the first season of the Mexican talent show La Academia.

It was released on January 25, 2011, and in digital form on February 1, 2011.

== Track listing ==
#	Title	Time
1.	"Ojitos color cáfe" (brown eyes); Writers: Rodolfo Villareal	3:02
2.	"Si una vez" (If once); Writers: Pete Astudillo/Abraham Quintanilla III	2:53
3.	"El gorrión y yo" (The sparrow and me); Writers: Tirzo Paiz	3:03
4.	"Secreto de Amor" (Secret love); Writers: Jose Manuel Figueroa	4:40
5.	"Se me olvidó otra vez" (I forgot again); Writers: Alberto Aguilera Valadez	2:42
6.	"Eres mi credo" (You are my creed); Writers: Enrique Guzman Yañez	3:11
7.	"Mi gusto es " (My taste is); Writers: Dolores Ayala Olivares	2:41
8.	"Con la misma piedra" (With the same stone); Writers: Jorge Macías Gómez	3:36
9.	"Tristes recuerdos" (Sad memories); Writers: Catarino Lara Benavides	2:38
10.	"Te aprovechas" (I take advantage of); Writers: Jorge Macías Gómez	3:04
11.	"Se te fué viva la paloma" (You live pigeon was); Writers: Juan Homero Aguilar Cabrera	2:51
12.	"El sauce y la palma" (The willow and the palm); Writers: Ignacio Pérez Meza	2:19
