= Nadia López =

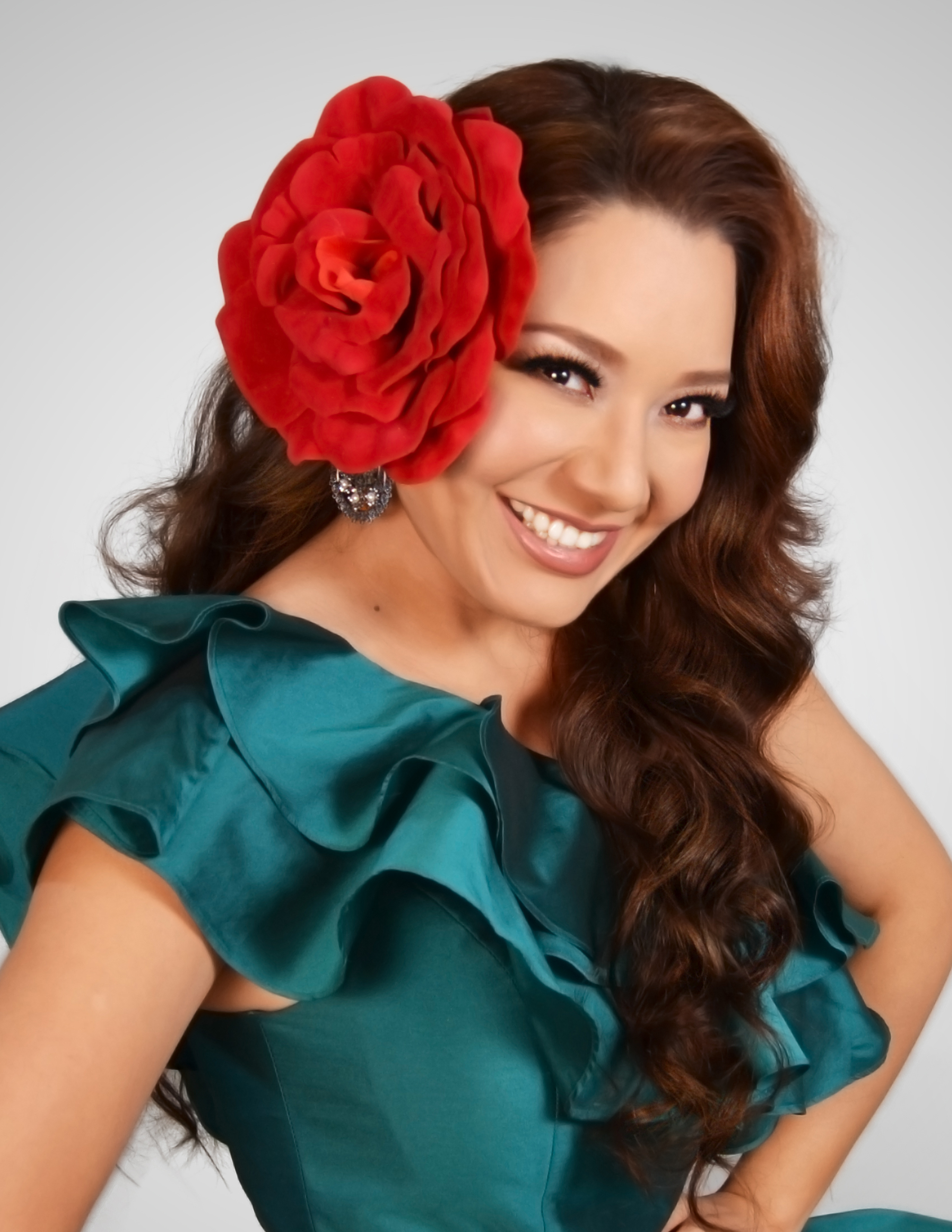

Background information
- Born: Nadia Yvonne López Ayuso; June 21, 1983 (age 42)
- Origin: Oaxaca, Oaxaca, Mexico
- Genres: Latin pop, Mexican Music
- Instrument: Vocals (Mezzo-soprano)
- Years active: 1995–present
- Label: WEA Music Latin

Nadia Yvonne López Ayuso (born June 21, 1983, in Oaxaca, Mexico) is a Mexican singer and reality television star and grammy nominee singer.

== Early life ==
Nadia was born to Mario López Hernández and Aurora Ayuso Rodríguez. She has an older brother named Mario Josué López Ayuso. Since childhood, Nadia embraced singing, but she kept her desire to perform hidden as her father did not embrace this idea. However, with the help of her mother, she participated in singing competitions such as "Fanta-sia Musical." Nadia soon won the support and help of her father and began to secure musical gigs. At 14, she was a presenter and singer in the television program "Panorama Musical" and presenter on "La Guelaguetza." While working in a restaurant, she sang with her father's mariachi group.

== Nadia's role in La Academia ==
Nadia won first prize in the V International Talent and Modeling Convention in 1998. She recorded CDs in Oaxaca, most notably "Enamorada de tí", released in 1998. In 2002, Nadia landed a spot on the Mexican reality show La Academia on Televisión Azteca. With her rendition of "Cucurrucucu Paloma", she made the final 14 contestants on June 30, 2002. Nadia gave over a dozen performances on the show, including songs by Rocío Dúrcal, Chayanne, Juan Gabriel, Marisela, and Selena. Although she was voted off in fifth place, her performances garnered her a contract with Warner Music to record her first CD.

In February 2003, Nadia's first album, called "Nadia", was released, featuring tracks "La differencia" ("The difference"), "La duda" ("The doubt"), and "Te voy a olvidar" ("I'm going to forget you"). The album reached #1 in Mexican sales weeks after its release and was certified gold (100,000 copies sold) within several months.

Nadia was again invited to participate in La Academia in March 2003 in a version uniting the show's first and second casts. On this show, now called "Desafio de Estrellas", Nadia was among the final five contestants, along with Yahir, Myriam, Estrella, and Erika. On June 13, Nadia was declared the runner-up of the show after performing in the Coca-Cola Auditorium in Monterrey, Mexico, in front of 30,000 people. Soon afterwards, Nadia's debut album was re-released in a special edition containing a DVD that featured an interview with Nadia and three live performances.

== After La Academia ==
In October 2003, Nadia was nominated for a Premio Oye (the Mexican equivalent of a Grammy) in two categories - "Revelación del año" (album of the year) and "Artista del año" (Artist of the year). She won album of the year at the ceremony on November 15, 2003. That month, her debut album went platinum, selling in excess of 150,000 copies.

In early 2004, Nadia briefly toured the United States to promote the release of her second album, Contigo sí ("With you, yes"). The title track from this album was featured as the theme song to Soñarás, a telenovela (soap opera) that aired on TVAzteca. Nadia's album went gold soon afterwards, and Nadia attained a fanbase not only in Mexico and the United States but in Guatemala, El Salvador, Venezuela, the Dominican Republic, and other Latin countries.

Nadia's third album, Endulzame el oido (Sweeten my ears), was released in 2005. It features two duets: one with Bobby Pulido ("Para olvidarte"), and one with the Texan group Costumbre ("El dedo en la llaga"). To date, she has sold very little worldwide.

Nadia released her fourth album, Mujer (Woman).which includes songs such as Abrazame, Heridas, Eternamente Bella and many more.

Her fifth album "Un Poco de Tus Besos" was released at September 24, 2007.

Her sixth album "A Puro Dolor" will be released on March 5, 2008. The album finally gives a chance to Nadia demonstrate her talent in the Ranchero music.

On December 3, 2008, Nadia got nominated for a Grammy Award in Best Regional Mexican Album category for her latest album "A Puro Dolor" making her one of the first La Academia contestants to be nominated for such a big award.

== Singles ==
- Esta Libertad- #52 (MEX)
- Como Hacerte Saber- #82 (MEX)
- Contigo Si w/ Yahir- #1 (1 Week) (MEX)
- Endulzame El Oido- #32 (MEX)
- Heridas- #91 (MEX)
- Abrázame- #98 (MEX)
- Un Poco de tus Besos- #72 (MEX)
