= Rosalía León Oviedo =

Mexican actress, singer, songwriter and guitarist (born 1974)

Rosalía León Oviedo (born July 14, 1974) is a Mexican actress, singer, songwriter and guitarist. She participated in the Mexican musical reality show La Academia. She released her first album through Sony Music in 2003 selling over 50,000 copies in the first four weeks.

== Early life ==
Rosalía León Oviedo was born in Mexico City on July 14, 1974. She is the founder and leader of the guitar project "Gliese 229", through which she revisits traditional Mexican songs by singing alongside an acoustic guitar and an electric guitar. She also composes.

She studied singing, guitar and guitar crafting, as well as pan flute and crystal flute. She studied techniques of South American rhythmic guitar with Ciro Hurtado and Ruben Izquierdo; music composition with Daniel Barjau; and luthiery at the Liceo Paracho Johrengua in Mexico City.

In August 2018, she recorded a special version of her song "Casi Creo que Aquí te Quedas" along with singer Eugenia León and guitarist Sergio Vallín. Theo shot the video. It is an invitation to Mexico and is based on the projection of representative images of Mexican culture.

On September 13, 2018, she made her solo debut in Havana, Cuba performing at the Teatro del Museo Nacional de Bellas Artes, which featured guest performances of singers Haydeé Milanés and Athanai, with electric guitars by César Huesca, Raúl Verdecia and Dayron Ortiz.

== Discography ==
Oviedo has two albums under her acoustic-electric guitar and voice concept, produced by herself:

- Alegorías (2013)
- Más Alto (2017) collaboration including Mike Stern, Sergio Vallín, Javier Bátiz, Raúl Fernandez Greñas, Julio Revueltas, Pavel Cal, César Huesca, Susana Harp, Sole Giménez and Kelvis

== Reception ==
Mas Alto lasted for more than 10 months among the best-selling albums in the genre of World Music in Mexico.

In 2018, on the first anniversary of the release of Más Alto, Oviedo recorded a special version of her song "Casi Creo Que Aquí Que Quedas" with Mexican singer Eugenia León.

== Sources ==
- El Heraldo de Chihuahua (20 August 2018). . By: Carmen Sánchez (In Spanish)
- La Jornada (18 August 2018). . By: Ernesto Márquez (In Spanish)
- García, Araceli (2018-08-14). "Rosalía rockea con folclor". El Universal (in Spanish).
- Baró, Carlos Olivares (2018-02-24). "Más Alto: nuevo derrotero del cancionero mexicano". La Razón.
- Edo México Político (21 February 2018). «Rosalía León estrena video de "Espectro"». By: Redacción MX Político. (In Spanish)
- Milenio (5 December 2017). «Rosalía León y su peculiar Fusión». By: Hugo García Michel. (In Spanish)
- Echávarri, Octavio (30 August 2017). "Pura energía: tres discos de poder femenino". www.elfinanciero.com.mx. El Financiero.
- Gallegos, Claudia (2017-08-14). "Con su música, Rosalía busca transmitir su amor el país". El Universal (in Spanish). El Universal.
- Reyes, Oscar (2017-08-01). "Rosalía León enaltece la música mexicana [VIDEO]". Diario de México (in Spanish).
- Vargas, Ana Cristina (27 September 2017). "Rompen con el clasismo". www.reforma.com. Periódico Reforma.
- García, Juan Carlos (26 November 2016). "Madre Sole hay una". www.reforma.com. Periódico Reforma.
- NOTIMEX (10 September 2016). "Cantautora Rosalía León, finalista en festival musical costarricense". www.20minutos.com.mx. Minutos.
- Starmedia (10 September 2016). «Cantautora Rosalía León finalista en festival musical costarricense». By: Starmedia (In Spanish)
- Sosa, Raul (21 September 2018). "ROSALÍA LEÓN". Contigo la Revista (in European Spanish).
- Macotela, Pablo; Maco. "Rosalía León triunfa en Cuba" (in European Spanish). Luciérnaga Informativa.
