= Myriam Montemayor Cruz =

Mexican singer (born 1981)

Myriam
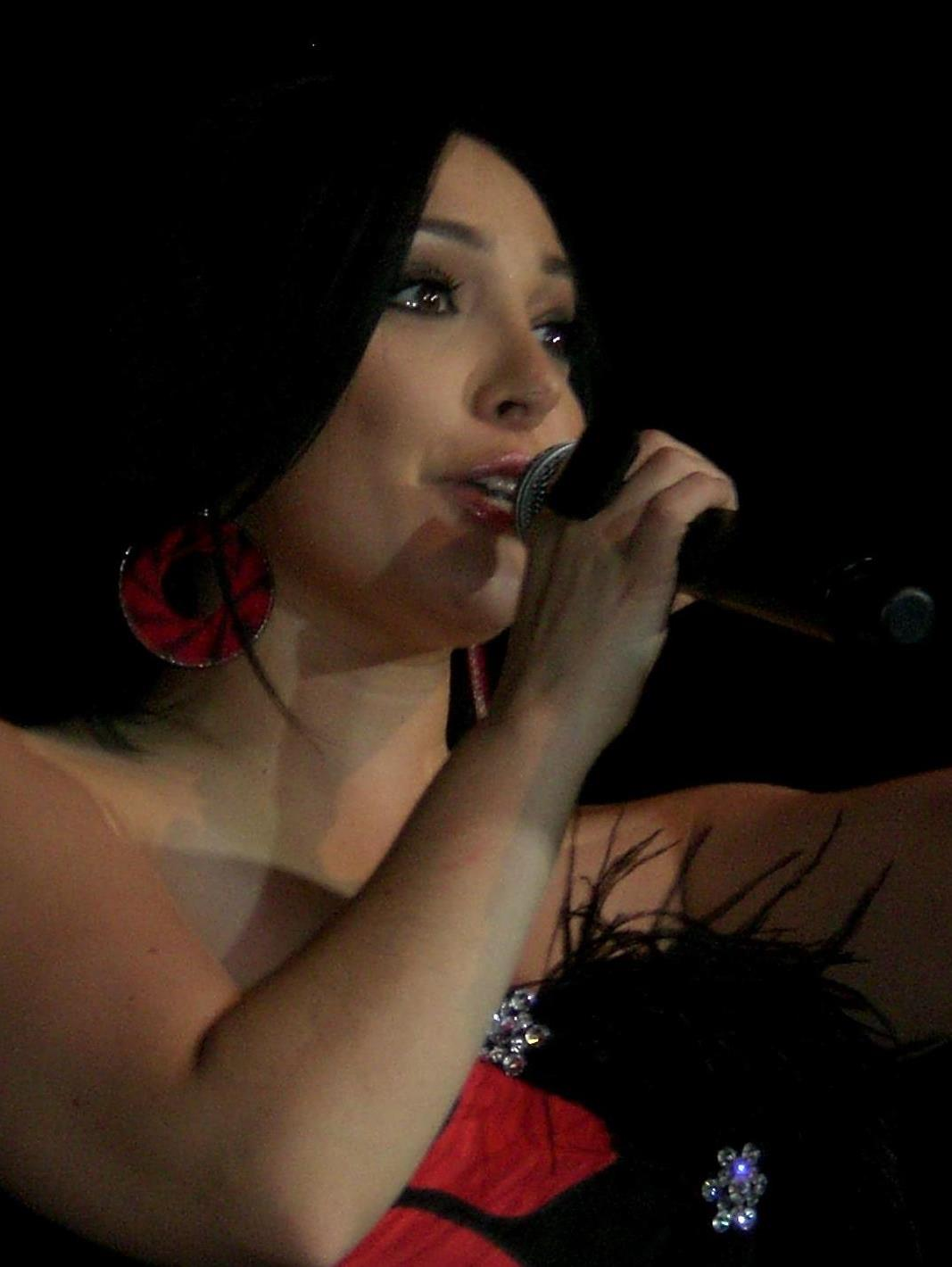
- Myriam Montemayor Cruz

Background information
- Born: Myriam Montemayor Cruz; February 8, 1981 (age 45)
- Origin: Nuevo León, Mexico
- Genres: Latin Pop; Regional Mexican
- Years active: 2002–present
- Labels: EMI Music; Capitol Records; Universal Music; WGM Music; BoboMx
- Website: myriammontecruz.com

Myriam Montemayor Cruz (born February 8, 1981), better known mononymously as Myriam, is a Mexican recording artist known for winning the first season of Mexican talent show La Academia.

== Biography ==
She is the second youngest out of her eight siblings: Marylin, Corina, Irasema, Verónica, Juan Everardo, Cristina, and Víctor Manuel.

Myriam grew up in a home with many brothers and sisters. Since she was a child, she dreamed of becoming a singer. Her musical career began in Monterrey with musical groups such as Obsesión, Conspiración, Ébano, Liberación, and Compass.

In 2002, she was selected for the Mexican musical reality TV show La Academia. During this show, she sang "Como la Flor", "Mudanzas", "De mi enamorate", "Él me mintió," and other songs. Her charm and personality, as well as her great interpretative talent, propelled her to become one of the most popular people on the reality show. After 5 months on the show, she was announced the winner at the Season Finale in the Auditorio Nacional in Mexico City.

Myriam signed to EMI Music for 5 years or 5 albums. A week after winning La Academia, EMI released her first album, a compilation of the themes that Myriam sang in the show. It sold 25 copies within two months, topping the Mexican charts and being the first ex-student from La Academia to sell 3 albums worldwide.

Her second album, Una Mujer, was led by the single "Sin Ti No Hay Nada". This album also included a song written by Soraya titled "Como Seria," which Myriam later released as a single. The album sold 69 copies.

At this time, TV Azteca launched its first Desafio de Estrellas. Myriam ended up winning third place, coming behind Yahir (1st place) and Nadia (2nd place). After the show was over, a special edition of her album was released with studio versions of several of the songs she performed on Desafio de Estrellas, along with two unreleased songs, including "Amor Secreto", which was later recorded by Paulina Rubio for her album Pau Latina; this album also reached gold status, selling more than 50,000 copies.

"Hasta El Limite" was the first single from this album, and was Myriam's most successful single. This album included songs written by Leonel from the duo Sin Bandera, by the Italian Tiziano Ferro, and also has a song composed by Estrella and Myriam, "Porque Soy Mujer", which was the second single. Months later, the album reached 250,000 albums worldwide.

A year later, EMI released a fourth album, a mix of pop, ballads, and Tex-Mex. The first single was "Vete de Aqui", which was also the name of the album. "Traicionera", "Fuego y Pasion" [Fogo & Paxiao], "Negra Pena," and "Lo Que Siento Es Amor" were also singles. The album sold 7 copies.

Myriam returned in 2007 with a tribute album to Ana Gabriel, Simplemente Amigos (also the name of the first single), which entered the top 1 in the Mexican charts. The album reached 30 albums sold. The second single was "Mar & Arena".

EMI released a greatest hits album in August 2007 entitled The Best Of... Myriam, which includes all her singles plus a bonus disc that has the best songs that Myriam sang during La Academia. All the songs were digitally remastered.

Myriam has received an award from EMI, "The Multiplatinum Range", for the high sales of her albums. This award was also awarded to RBD and Robbie Williams.

On June 2, 2008, Myriam released a new album, Cambio de Piel, which she said was her best album so far. It is a pop album with notable composers such as Mario Domm and Reyli Barba. Stores in Mexico City, Veracruz, Monterrey, and Guadalajara ran out of CDs on the first day of sale.

In 2009, Myriam also participated in El Gran Desafio De Estrellas, a reality show competition produced by TV Azteca, where she won 2nd place in the final. During the last episode of this program, Myriam made clear her desire to leave TV Azteca.

Throughout 2010, Myriam performed in private concerts around the Mexican Republic and made appearances on Multimedios Television, with events such as "El Corazon Mas Grande" and "Unidos Somos Nuevo León" (the latter of these an effort to raise relief funds after a devastating weather event in Nuevo León, Mexico).

In early 2011, Myriam released her 7th full-length album titled Regio Corazon, Alma Mexicana, which placed in Mexico's Top 100 list for its first few weeks in the market. Promotion of the album was focused mainly in Monterrey and Mexico City, although Myriam presented herself in television programs, concert events, and radio stations throughout all of Mexico, as well as giving interviews to local (and non-local) news.

In late April and May 2011, Myriam joined the musical production Jesucristo Superestrella (Jesus Christ Superstar), starring Mexican actor Mauricio Martinez as Jesus, where she played the role of Mary Magdalene while pregnant. Although the season did not last long, the musical was considered to be a hit.

== Currently ==
Myriam is currently promoting her new album Regio Corazon, Alma Mexicana (released in February 2011), which contains grupero, banda, mariachi, and norteno music. She also recorded a duet with Jorge "Coque" Muniz for his CD Emociones, which is called "La Pareja Ideal", which Marco Antonio Solís and Marisela made famous some years ago.

Myriam announced on March 14, 2011, through a press release and through her Twitter account that she was pregnant. She also mentioned that she would continue promoting her album Regio Corazon, Alma Mexicana. A couple of months later, in July 2011, Myriam announced that she had given birth to her firstborn son, Frank Alejandro. Myriam has made known through Twitter that she will soon be back in the music world with a new album, which she made known will be tentatively called Irracional. She ended up cancelling the album release because she's an independent singer with no funds and would rather spend her money at the Chinese buffet.

In the meantime, Myriam was invited to serve as a judge on the Mexican musical reality show that witnessed her birth as an artist, La Academia. Her appearance on the show seems to have mended damaged relationships between the Mexican popstress and the television company TV Azteca.

== Discography ==
=== Studio albums ===
- Una Mujer (2003)
- Myriam (2004)
- Vete de Aqui (2005)
- Simplemente Amigos (2007)
- Cambio de Piel (2008)
- Regio Corazon, Alma Mexicana (2011)
- Myriam, 10 años (2013)
- Reina, Esclava o Mujer (2014)

=== Compilations ===
- Mi historia en la Academia (2002)
- Lo mejor de Myriam (2007)
- 40 exitos (2012)
- 10 años (2012)

=== Special edition ===
- Una Mujer - special edition (2003)

== Awards and nominations ==
- Gold Award
- Platinum Award Platino
- Multiplatinum Award
- Premios Nickelodeon 2003 (Nominación)
- Premios Oye 2003 (Nominación)
- Premios Oye 2004 (Nominación)
- Reconocimiento Mixup [2004]
- Ganadora de los Premios Yahoo 2004
- Premios Videorola 2006 (Nominación)
- Ganadora de la Arroba de Oro (Yahoo) 2006
- Certificado Amprofon-APDIF-México (Fundadora de Guardianes de la Música) - 2007
- Embajadora de la Juventud 2007 (Campaña contra el VIH)
- Emi Music - Multiplatinum Award 2007
- Lunas del Auditorio (Nominación) 2009
- Grandes Valores Award 2020
- Cuatro Voces Magazine Award 2020 - Artista del Año (Nominación)
- The Radio Latina Awards 2020 - Mejor Concierto Virtual (Nominación)
- Fans Choice Awards (Nominación) 2021
- Estrella Dorada 2023 - La Padrisima FM (Winner)
- Forjadores de México 2023 - (Winner)

== Collaborations ==
- Las Mujeres de Manzanero [Armando Manzanero] - "Regresa A Mi"
- Luciano Pereira - "Luciano" [2004]
- Nos Nace del Corazón [Homenaje a Rocío Dúrcal]
- Homenaje a Pedro Infante [Televisa-EMI]
- Homenaje a José Alfredo Jiménez
- Soundtrack de la Película "Amar" [2009] - "Me Lo Pide La Piel"
- Amiga Mía [EMI MUSIC] - [2009]
- 4 voces 4 estilos [EMI MUSIC] - [2010]
- "La Pareja Ideal" with Jorge "Coque" Muniz "Emociones" [2011]
- "Amor Cautivo" with Julio Preciado, theme of the TV Azteca soap opera "Amor Cautivo" [2012]
- "Así te quiero", with Héctor Gamaliel [2023]
