= Andrea Noli =

Mexican-French actress (born 1972)

- Born: Andrea Gabriela Noli Costantinescu; August 25, 1972 (age 54); Paris, France
- Occupation: Actress
- Children: 1
- Parents: Daniel Noli (father); Olga Constantinescu (mother)

Andrea Gabriela Noli Constantinescu (born 25 August 1972), known professionally as Andrea Noli, is a French-born Mexican actress of Romanian descent.

== Life ==
She has participated in various telenovelas and theatrical productions. She is the daughter of pianist, Daniel Noli and Olga Constantinescu. She lived in Athens, Greece during the 80s where she attended high school in Ampelokipi district. As a student she was elected in the fifteen-member students association board. After school she moved to North America ending up in Mexico where she have lived her infant years. She has a daughter, Valentina, born on September 9, 2006, with actor Jorge Salinas.

In 2025, Noli joined the cast of Chespirito: Not Really on Purpose, reprising the role of Angelines Fernández, the Spanish-Mexican actress who portrayed Doña Clotilde in El Chavo del Ocho.

== Trajectory ==
Year	Title	Role	Notes
1995	Si Dios me quita la vida	Unknown role	
1995	Acapulco, cuerpo y alma	Sandra	
1999	Cuentas claras	Debbie Saunders	
1999	Besos prohibidos	Basurto	
2001	Corazones rotos	Mari Carmen	
2002	Por ti	Andrea Montalbán	
2004	La Heredera	Kauris	
2005	Top Models	Valeria	
2005	Los Sánchez	Luciana	
2006	Ni una vez más	Dalia	
2007	Se Busca Un Hombre	Angélica Soler	
2008	Noche eterna	Rosana	
2009	Pasión Morena	Silvia Rueda	
2011	Cielo Rojo	Lucrecia Renteria	
2012	Amor Cautivo	Beatriz del Valle	
2013	Vivir a Destiempo	Sonia Duarte	
2015	Tanto amor	Carolina Méndez	
2017	Entreolivos	Estela	
2020	Desaparecida	Olivia Zamora	
2021	Esta historia me suena	Lorenza	Episode: "Limón y sal"
2023	Madre de alquiler	Inna	
2025	Chespirito: Sin querer queriendo	Angelines Fernández	
2026	Guardián de mi vida	Inés Encino	
