= Adrián Varela =

Mexican singer

- Born: Adrián Varela Avilés; December 20, 1983 (age 42)
- Origin: Culiacán, Sinaloa, Mexico
- Genres: Pop, Latin
- Occupation: Singer
- Years active: 2005–present
- Label: Sony BMG

Adrián Eduardo Varela Avilés (born December 20, 1983 in Culiacán, Sinaloa) is a Mexican Pop and Latin singer and one of the former contestants of the fourth generation of popular Mexican reality show La Academia. He is the son of Isidro Varela and Dora Elvia Avilés. He has a younger sister, Carolina. He is known to be a young person of strong and sensible character with a great voice that emphasizes it. He went to University of Sinaloa to major in marketing. He is fluent in Spanish and English.

== Early career ==
Adrian has been in the music world for a long time, he started playing the violin at a very young age. Later, he was part of "Rodalla Voces y Cuerdas del Mañana", and was also the vocalist for the band "La Quinta Sincronia" As part of this group, he participated in events and city contests. He was also part of his native Church choir.

== La Academia ==
Adrian attempted to be part of La Academia in all of the seasons. Unfortunately, he had no luck in entering to any of the first three generations. It was until the fourth try that he was accepted to be part of the 2005 season.

In February 2005, La Academia 4th Generation started. On the first concert, he sang a duet with former participant Marco with the song "Ahora Quien" (originally by Marc Anthony). For the first 9 concerts, Adrian's talent shone. At the end of the 9th concert the votes did not favored him, he was then expelled from the reality show. This brought a riot among Adrian's fans who were stunned at the fact that he, having such a powerful voice and talent, was being kicked out of the show.

In the 11th concert, host Alan Tacher announced to everyone that Concert 12 was going to be a concert in which three expelled contestants would have the chance to get back into the show. It was then that Adrian came back along with former contestants Johanna and Paula.

After this opportunity, Adrian showed improvement each week, fighting for a place in the final. He had 6 concerts, in which he showed potential. The 19th Concert "LA GRAN FINAL" came live from Monterrey, Adrian sang two interpretations, the first of them being "Me va a Extrañar" (originally by Ricardo Montaner), and "Sueña" (originally by Luis Miguel). With these two songs he won 3rd place of the 4th Generation of La Academia.

After the end of La Academia 4ta Generacion, 12 of the formers contestants went on tour for more than 4 months. The tour included more than 30 cities in Mexico and 15 shows in the United States.

"I have always dreamed about being a recognized artist, selling records, to know the world, and to the world to know a little about me, I have always given the best of me. I'm a person who looks for opportunities, I'm just waiting for the right time to be a very important person in the music industry," Adrian stated.

== La Posta ==
In 2007, he was part of a band made up of 6 former 'Academia' contestants. The group members included Yazmin, Citlali, Silvia, Cesar, Vince and Adrián. The group was called "La Posta", meaning "The Truth". The group signed record deal with Sony BMG. In 2009, Adrian left the group to pursue his solo career with his CD 'Homenaje a Los Grandes'.

== Discography ==
In September 2005 with support of Azteca Music and Sony BMG, he released his first production titled "Mi historia en la Academia...Una Forma de Sentir" ("My history in La Academia... A way of feeling"). This production contains 15 of his best songs sung in the reality show. The CD includes a free DVD, which contains all his live presentations.

- Homenaje A Los Grandes (2009)
- Una Forma de Sentir (CD + DVD)
- "Lo Mejor de La Academia Cuarta Generación" (CD + DVD) 1 song
- "Amor en Custodia Soundtrack" (CD) 1 song
- "Desafío de Estrellas" (CD) 2 songs
- Destinos de fuego soundtrack 1 song
- "Amor en Custodia Soundtrack 2" (CD + DVD) 1 song
- "Navidad con las Estrellas de La Academia" (CD) 1 song
