= Aranza =

Mexican singer

- Born: Aranza Becerra Meza; September 27, 1971 (age 54)
- Origin: Chihuahua, Mexico
- Genres: Latin, pop
- Occupations: Singer, television presenter
- Years active: 1991–present

Aranza (born September 27, 1971) is a Mexican singer, known for her work in TV Azteca with singer-songwriter Armando Manzanero and for interpreting Dime, the theme song for Mirada de Mujer, one of the most successful Mexican telenovelas of all time.

== Beginnings in Televisa ==
=== Grupo Zarabanda ===
From a young age, Aranza showed a strong interest in singing, inspired by her father, who was a professional singer. Her parents supported her and encouraged her to take singing classes, and at the age of 10, she performed live in Chihuahua with her father. At the age of 15, Aranza moved to Mexico City to fulfill her dream of becoming a professional singer with the help of Televisa, the most important network in the country. Her first steps in the music business started with Grupo Zarabanda, a musical group which formed in 1990 and with which she reached popularity after the group sang "Estrella de Ilusion" (Star of Hope), the theme song for the Mexican telenovela Alcanzar una estrella II. Because of the success of the telenovela and their song, Grupo Zarabanda toured Mexico with Muñecos de Papel, a group formed from the telenovela, whose members included Ricky Martin and Sasha Sokol. Grupo Zarabanda eventually disbanded.

=== Solo career ===
The disappearance of the Grupo Zarabanda gave rise to the solo career of Aranza, who, in 1994, released her first album, Aranza. Although the singles released from the album were moderately played on Mexican radio stations, the album was not given enough support and failed to reach the mainstream public. A special instance in this period of time is Aranza's visit to Siempre en Domingo, one of the most important programs of the time, and probably the most important musical show in the history of Televisa. After singing "Mentiras y Lagrimas" in front of the show's live audience, Raúl Velasco, the host, who softly kicked all the new artists in the show as a sign of good luck to come in their careers, said to Aranza:

Today, there's going to be no kick, because I'm not capable of touching a woman this beautiful and talented...Aranza, you're a beautiful person, physically and emotionally. I'm not going to kick you as you are a very special human being. Finally a new star for Mexico and the world... .

Aranza's second album, Mi Isla Desierta, was released in 1995 but the release of Fey and Gloria Trevi's albums pushed back the album which failed to receive support from the record company. The song Sin Amor, from this album, became the theme song for the telenovela Sentimientos Ajenos, however, this didn't help boost record sales and the album became the second flop in Aranza's career.

== Work with TV Azteca ==
=== Mirada de Mujer ===
Because Televisa did not give her and her albums support, Aranza decided to move to the country's other important network TV Azteca, which gave her the support she needed to reach public mainstream. In 1997, the network announced the production of the telenovela titled Mirada de Mujer, a remake of a Colombian soap opera made in the early 90s. The telenovela's theme song, Dime, produced by Armando Manzanero, would be sung by Aranza. Manzanero would also produce Aranza's third album, also titled Mirada de Mujer. Success came for the telenovela and the theme song itself, which reached the Mexican Top 10 and became a major hit in Puerto Rico, Costa Rica and other Latin countries. Dime, also entered Billboard's Hot Latin Tracks, peaking at 22.

After the success of the telenovela, Aranza participated in other projects for TV Azteca, including the production of an album directed to the arrival of Pope John Paul II to Mexico, and as a host in TV Azteca's Tempranito 2000, similar to the American The Today Show. However, because of problems with her manager and the lack of support from the network, Aranza, would not appear in Mexican TV for another six years.

=== Desafio de Estrellas ===
In 2006, Aranza returned to Mexican TV in the Desafio de Estrellas 2006, a new version of the same program previously produced in 2003 by TV Azteca. Of the 32 Desafio contestants, 23 were former La Academia students, and clear favorites, while the other 9 (with Aranza pertained to) were artists previously produced by the network in the late 90s.

In the first few concerts, most of the non-Academia singers were eliminated, to the point that on the 15th concert only three remained: Alejandra Ley, actress and singer of the network, Jose Joel, son of Mexican superstar José José and Aranza. After 25 concerts of rising popularity, stellar interpretations and three awards for Best singer of the Night, Aranza reached the finale, and became the only non-Academia singer to do so. In the finale, after interpreting her best song in the competition, all four judges praised her work and wished luck to everything she did in her career.

== Discography ==
=== Albums ===
- Aranza (1994)
- Mi Isla Desierta (1995)
- Mirada de Mujer (1997)
- Ama (1999)
- Lo Mio (2003)
- Desafiando al Tiempo (2006)
- Águila y Sol (2010)
- Vivir a Destiempo (2013)
- Te Acuerdas (2014)
- Sólo Manzanero (2018)
