= Menny =

Menny Carrasco
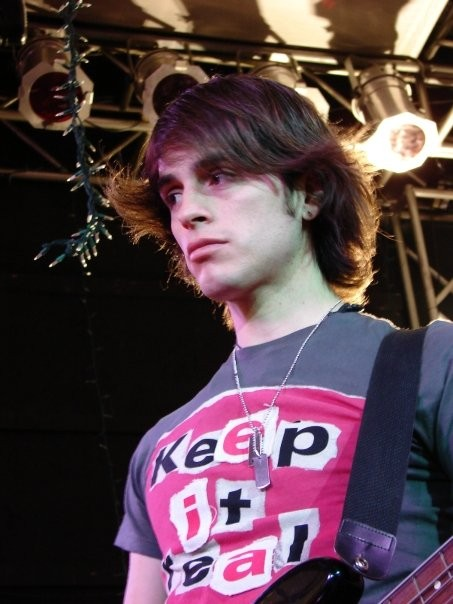

Background information
- Also known as: Menny
- Born: Manuel Alejandro Carrasco de la O January 21, 1983 (age 43)
- Origin: Chihuahua, Chihuahua
- Genres: Latin pop, Indie Pop
- Occupations: Singer, songwriter
- Instruments: Voice, piano, guitar.
- Years active: 2009–present
- Website: Official Page

Manuel Alejandro Carrasco de la O (born January 21, 1983, in Chihuahua, Mexico), commonly known as Menny, is a Mexican singer / songwriter, and former contestant of the popular Mexican reality television series La Academia and Segunda Oportunidad.

== Biography ==
In 1989 began studying music / theater in the school of "Taller de Arte" which first receives an opportunity to open to the public debut at the Teatro Fernando Saavedra in a montage of the work " Vaseline" by participating as "Dany". From now on musical theater and singing were fundamental in life and never stopped Menny appear within his extracurricular activities to the point of dropping out to start a solo career that has taken him to share the stage with artists such as, Maná, Betto Calleti, Fernando Delgadillo, Alejandro Filio, Circle, Conjunto Primavera Diego Torres, Aleks Syntek, Belanova, Jan, Facundo, Jeans, Motel Eduardo Capetillo, etc.

Also 4th place holder, as well as an interpreter issued by the ITESM in the competition Festival de la Cancion at the system level.

From 1998 begins a new stage as solo and songwriter that would lead him to produce a series of successful concerts under its name and lead in various theaters of the City of Chihuahua, becoming known to the public Chihuahua. In 2004 is invited to participate in the production of "El graduado" where artists share the stage with the likes of Margarita Gralia, Oswaldo Benavides, Paola Núñez among others, under the baton of Oscar-nominated Felipe Fernandez del Paso.

== La Academia (2009) ==
In September 2009 kicks off in different cities of the republic, the casting to form the generation of the TV reality show Mexican TV Azteca, La Nueva Academia.

Representing the state of Chihuahua, Menny qualify to be achieved within the 36 students taking the October 4 his first appearance before the Mexican public and international performing the song "Todo Cambio" the group Camila.

During his stay in the house of La Academia had a visit from his wife Mariana and his son Manuel, and the opportunity to meet one of their favorite artists, Alejandro Sanz giving the opportunity to interpret in the fourth concert of La Academia on a song "Corazón Partido". He suffered a decompensation due to low blood pressure, combined with weak immune systems because it was under heavy medication of antibiotics due to an infection in the airways had what it took for first time in their presentations to be sentenced and in danger of being expelled from the reality. After 11 concerts achievement to be one of the seven finalists vying for first place in the final was held on December 20, 2009, in Tuxtla, Gutierrez, Chiapas getting 5th place in the competition with a prize for being the best student of the New Academy by their teachers.

=== Songs interpreted in La Academia ===
| Concert | 1 | 2 | 3 | 4 | 5 | 6 | 7 | 8 | 9 | 10 | 11 | 12 |
|---|---|---|---|---|---|---|---|---|---|---|---|---|
| Menny | Todo cambió | No soy el aire | Vuelve | Corazón partido | Ahora quien | Te amo | Princesa tibetana | Cuando seas grande | Cielo y Déjame vivir | TBC y Te solté la rienda | A Dios le pido y Si no estas conmigo | Sueña, Burbujas de amor y Será que no me amas |

After his departure was presented in several programs TV Azteca and January 6 was one of several artists who appeared in the Jugueton conducted by the television station in Mérida Yucatan.

== La Nueva Academia Tour (2010) ==
The 31 by April provided the opportunity for the finalists of La Nueva Academia, Menny, Napoleon, Sebastian, Agustin, Oscar, and Giovanna Fabiola were presented in what was his first concert as ex-academics, in sports Texcoco, State of Mexico, with a full house and thousands of fan. After this came the presentation by Menny and his colleagues in the Auditorio Nacional.

== Segunda Oportunidad (2010) ==
On March 21, 2010, a new reality show began made by TV Azteca. Composed of 52 graduates of the seven generations of La Academia, The United States version divided into groups of four members, each representing singing, dancing, and instruments, commanded by a captain. One of the most popular captains, Menny yellow team number four, Alejandra Capellini as dance captain, Wendolee Ayala as instrument captain, and Andrea in singing, playing the first Sunday concert Ni rosas ni juguetes in the version of Paulina Rubio/Pitbull genre choreography. lost the challenge against the white team led by Israel, was elected by critics responsible to defend his team in the tightrope, the challenge faced by a convicted member of each team to be saved, resulting Menny winner chosen by critics leading his team to the next concert. In the second concert Menny and his team interpret Casate Conmigo by Reyli in Acoustic genre, moving in line with your wedding that took place a day before its presentation to win the challenge against the team 5 military color. In the next concert with his team plays "Todo Cambio" duranguense version, making the team the most votes of the night and getting the right to "switch" in which change their mate Andrea generation Agustin who was about to leave thus becoming a stronger team by taking them to the next concert, with a new stage of reality, which performed "Mientes" in genre acoustic taking the applause of the public and winning the challenge against the purple team, decided to strengthen its team by changing Alejandra Capellini by Matias. At the concert in May, even under the baton of Menny, the team achieved a great presentation with the song "La Fuerza del Corazón" by Alejandro Sanz and decided to strengthen with Dulce Lopez, now this one most complete equipment and strong competition, sparking a number of duels interpret and draw against the Orange team, the first one with the song "Suelta mi mano" of Sin Bandera, making it one of the most anticipated clashes night because of the opposing team was Sebastian, one of his best friends within La Academia and member of the famous Club de Toby, thus having to re-face in the next concert they performed "Llorare las penas" of David Bisbal, winning the second tie against the orange team and being forced to face a new challenge in the genre of songs where I play "Aun" by Coda. Unfortunately for the judges the opposing team became the winner of the challenge deciding Sebastian and his team for lack of a member who was sentenced to adhere to Menny and in such case to Israel who was part of the orange team would come to save part of his former Yellow team.

Now with a new team, Orange, made by Sebastian, Cesar and Manuel, following one of the strongest teams in the competition, being a team of men, in concert 8, they lose against the turquoise, captained by Laura Caro, after singing "Pedro Navajas" receiving reinforcement, changing Wendolee by Caesar. After spending the dance challenge, the team goes to the next concert in which he plays "Amor Amor" by José José version of Luis Fonsi doing tonight, one of the most exciting for Menny in the reality. After the triple confrontation against the yellow and gray, the team winner, led by Agustin, decided to strengthen and change to Mario Sepulveda for Sebastian. As one of the teammates Menny was convicted for not complying with the rules of the house, the orange team keeps only three members. After the confrontation below to continue competing, the team fails to have enough votes and that is causing the expulsion of the night, having only the option of the winning team, decides to join or strengthen your team with one member of the team loser. The team that had the most votes during the night was the turquoise, which had lost a member by discipline, because it was transferred to gray for not following the rules, Laura decides to adhere to a member that were in the piston Wendolee, your best friend and Menny, who the audience cheering to the capitan to choose for your team; after a great strain on the study, Laura decided to rescue the Menny and reject her friend Wendolee, arriving with a new team to the semi-finals where they interpret "Puedes Llegar" against the Yellow Team where was already a part of the club toby, turquoise loses the challenge and Agustin decides to strengthen his team and changing Matias by Menny, completing most of the Club, which was one of the dreams that each of the members of this Club, desired to happen, going together towards the final and becoming one of the favorites to win the contest.

On June 6, 2010, just took the high end of the Segunda Oportunidad, in the studies Churubusco, starting with a red carpet where participants of the reality show marched along with the talent of TV Azteca. Composed of five rounds, started the final, where the first song performed by Menny and his team was "Que Nvel de Mujer" by Luis Miguel, which is part of the repertoire of songs performed during the tour of La Nueva Academia, taking the applause of the audience and excellent rating by the jury from the sigueinete round where they performed in the genre ballad "Regresa a mi" by Il Divo getting the first perfect scores of the night and after spending a majority of votes continued to compete by taking them to perform at the Duranguense genre with "No soy el aire" making the audience dancing and staying within the first places in the voting part and the last two finalists along with the turquoise, came time to interpret the Mariachi genre where they sang "Yo no se olvidar" by Alejandro Fernández giving a great performance and demonstrating that they could attach to most genres. After a night full of emotions began the challenge acoustic with the song "Aqui estoy yo" by Luis Fonsi, opening the interpretation Menny playing the violin and then follow up with the piano, guitar Agustin, Sebastian with drawers and Oscar with bass, eventually excite the public and jurors after a close vote, managed to be crowned the winners of reality show.

That same night, Menny and his companions the Toby Club, got the news that Napoleon, who had been part of a rule during the transmission of La Academia of this club, had decided to devote his solo career giving way to the Argentine Matias join the group.

A few weeks later the group was invited to participate in the soap opera of the same channel TV Azteca"Quiereme", Matías Aranda already joined the group.

=== Songs performed in Segunda Oportunidad ===
| Concert | 1 | 2 | 3 | 4 | 5 | 6 | 7 | 8 | 9 | Semi-final | Final 5 Rounds |
|---|---|---|---|---|---|---|---|---|---|---|---|
| Menny | Ni rosa ni juguetes | Casate conmigo | Todo cambio (Version Duranguense) | Mientes | La Fuerza del Corazón | Suelta mi mano | Llorare las penas | Pedro Navajas | Amor Amor | Puedes Llegar | Que Nivel de Mujer, Regresa a mi, No soy el Aire(Duranguense), No se Olvidar y Aqui Estoy Yo |

=== After Segunda Oportunidad (2010) ===
After the participation in reality show, Menny, being part of his new band dubbed "The Tobys" was invited by Dule (who were part of the jury in Segunda Oportunidad), with Agustin, Sebastian and Oscar (fellow reality show), have a stake in the concert special Mujeres Mexicanas Cantantes Asesinas made in the Auditorio Nacional.

== Collaborations and discography ==
"Hablando de Sueños"
"Hablando de sueños", soundtrack of the Mexican movie Melted Hearts.

- Hablando de sueños soundtrack of the Mexican movie Melted Hearts (2010)
- Aun existe el amor, main theme of the telenovela Vidas Robadas (2010)
- Special appearance in the telenovela Quiereme of TV Azteca (2010)

=== Discography ===
- 2010: Hablando de sueños (Solo
  1. Dame lo que quiero
  2. Que vas a querer de beber
  3. Si volvemos a empezar
  4. Por siempre
  5. Hablando de sueños
  6. Lo siento
  7. Y te encontre
  8. Y nunca te olvide
  9. Solo se vive una vez
  10. Ya casi te olvido
  11. No sé vivir sin ti
  12. Y regresó la lluvia
