= Agustín Argüello =

Spanish singer

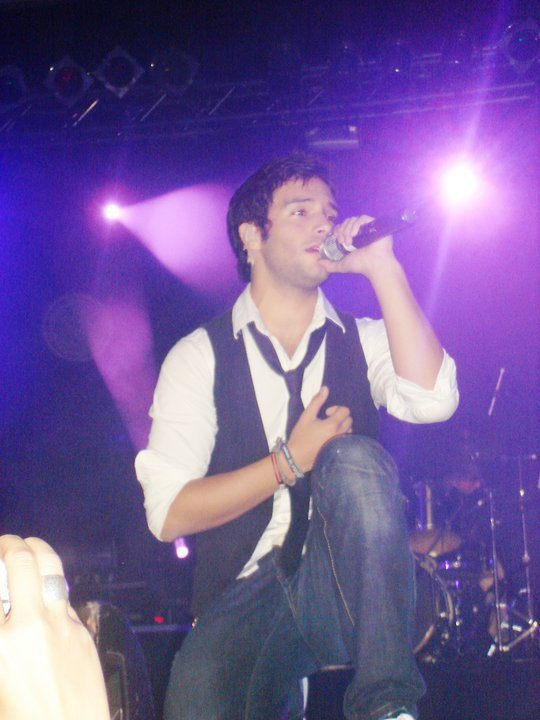
- Born: Agustín Alejandro Argüello; 7 November 1989 (age 37); Córdoba, Argentina
- Occupations: Singer, actor, tv host; songwriter
- Years active: 2009–present
- Musical career
- Genres: Pop; teen pop; pop rock

Agustín Alejandro Argüello, (Córdoba, Argentina; born 7 November 1989), commonly known as Agustín Argüello, is an Argentine actor and singer. He became known in the Argentine reality show Operación Triunfo 2009 and, in Mexico, La Academia 2009 and Segunda Opportunidad, a program that crowned him the winner. After finishing the program, he joined the youth musical group Tobby, which dissolved at the end of 2012 and began his career as a soloist and Musical Theater actor, where his participation in musicals such as The Lion King (in Mexico and Spain) stood out. Los Miserables y Ghost: El Musical, where he received his first nomination for Best Male Performance in a Musical.

== Early life ==
Agustín Arguello was born in Córdoba, Argentina on 7 November 1989. He is the son of Daniel Argüello and Adriana Mercado (she was born in the city of La Rioja), both architects, and he has a younger brother, Martín Argüello. From the age of 4 he attended the Nuestra Señora del Loreto Institute, until he was 18, where he graduated and entered the National University of Córdoba, studying a Bachelor of Film and TV.

His father taught him to play the guitar as a child, the first instrument with which Agustín began to accompany himself and with which he composed his first songs and recorded them at home with his computer.

== Career ==
=== 2009: Operación Triunfo ===
In February 2009, Agustín auditioned in Córdoba for the fourth edition of the Argentinian musical reality show Operación Triunfo, broadcast on Telefé. In March he entered the first program which was a live casting. After his first performance, Volver a amar, by Cristian Castro, Agustín manages to be one of the 19 participants of the program and they enter the Casa de Operación Triunfo, a format that was combined with that of Big Brother.

After 17 concerts in four months, Argüello won third place and signed a contract with Warner Music Argentina, who proposed he duet with Sebastián Martingaste.

=== 2009: La Academia ===
The duet does not last long, since both enter the reality show La Academia in September of that same year. After 12 concerts, a semi-final in Guatemala in front of more than 100,000 people, in the capital's main square, Agustín once again reaches the final of the program, broadcast from the Víctor Manuel Reyna Stadium, in Chiapas, reaching 4th place.

=== 2010: Segunda opportunidad ===
At the end of the Academy, TV Azteca announced that Agustín would be part of the new soap opera Quiéreme Tonto. However, it was later announced that he would enter Segunda Oportunidad, a show that brought together the best participants from 8 generations of La Academia, who failed to win. The dynamic was group, and Agustín was the captain of the Red team until concert 3, where he joins the Yellow team. Agustín becomes captain of the Yellow team in the 7th concert and reaches the final, the team taking first place, winning 2 million pesos.

== Tobby ==
After winning Segunda Opportunidad, together with his teammates from the Yellow team and a member of the Turquoise Blue team, Sebastián, Matías, Oskar and Menny, make up the musical group "Tobby" which releases its first single "Quiero Amar", a Spanish adaptation of "Open Arms" by Journey. After rejoining the soap opera "Quiéreme tonto" with his group mates, they released the video clip for "Quiero Amar" and began their first tours throughout Mexico, performing at a concert at the Palacio de los Deportes in Mexico City, sharing the stage with Kylie Minogue, Wisin & Yandel and Enrique Iglesias. In March 2011 they released their second single "Déjalo" which reaches the top positions on the radio. The album "TOBBY" came out in July of that year and reached number 2 in its first week. The 3rd single "MIÉNTEME", which debuts Agustín as a composer, along with the producer and composer Jules Ramllano.

After the departure of Sebastián Martingaste from the group, Tobby released two more singles "Mi Quinto Elemento" and "Despiértame Ya" and in November 2012, they decided to separate and go their separate ways after 115 concerts throughout Mexico, the United States, Guatemala and El Salvador, with more than 15,000 albums sold, more than half a million views of his songs on YouTube, and having shared the stage with artists such as Reik, Paty Cantú, Reyli Barba, Jesse & Joy, Noel Schajris, Leonel García, Belinda, among others.

== Solo career and acting ==
=== 2012-2013: "Destino" and "Una noche más" ===
Agustín begins his career as a soloist, and his first big step is to be the composer of the main song of the Azteca soap opera "Destino", performed by Carmen Ríos, "Mi Camino es Tu Amor", which positions him as a composer, also collaborating on songs by artists such as Manuel Paz, Napoleón Robleto and Menny Carrasco. In addition to his participation as an actor in the unitary "Lo que callamos las mujeres", Agustín also debuted as a host alongside Cynthia Rodríguez, in the program "La Vida Es Una Canción", aired in April and May 2013, and He graduated from an acting workshop at the CEFAT school of TV Azteca.

In March 2013, Agustín recorded a show for Azteca Conecta, where he filmed a video clip and a song of his own called "Una Noche Más". Agustín records the pop version of the song and releases it on his YouTube channel and iTunes.

In a blast released by his official website, the singer announced on 26 August 2013 that he was recording his first single with music producer Benjamín Díaz, who has already worked with other artists such as Reyli, Marconi and Tobby themselves.

=== 2013: First Single and theatrical debut ===
On 23 September 2013, Agustín releases his first official single as a solo artist. The song is called "Cuanto Más" and was written by himself, along with Cecy Leos, singer of the group Kaay, and Francisco Oroz. That same day a lyric video comes out on their official YouTube channel and the song goes on sale on iTunes. The song has romantic overtones and maintains the ballad style that Agustín had demonstrated since the beginning of his career.

The day before the launch, Agustín premiered in the play "El Mago De Oz", a musical where he plays the Tin Man, sharing the billboard with Edgar Vivar, known for his characters Ñoño and Señor Barriga, from the show "El Chavo of 8". This becomes her theatrical debut, despite having made a minimal participation in 2009, in the OCESA musical, Mamma Mia! The work gave its last performance on 1 December of that same year, being in theaters for 11 weeks.

As of 26 November, "Cuanto Más" had already entered some charts such as the "Hit Parade", the most important ranking in Córdoba, Argentina, which lasted 12 weeks, reaching a maximum of position #13. and on Monitor Latino, which has been among the Hot 100 since 1 November, peaking at position #65 of the most played Pop songs in Mexico, USA, Dominican Republic and Puerto Rico.

=== 2014: "Qué rico mambo" and "Las Bravo" ===
On 21 December 2013, Agustín's participation in the play "Qué Rico Mambo" by producer Eduardo Paz was announced along with great personalities of the Mexican soap opera, such as Lourdes Munguía, Olivia Collins, Salvador Zerboni, PeeWee, among others. . The play premieres on 4 April with a full box office at the Blanquita Theater.

On 7 April 2014, three days after its premiere, she released "Desnudas Mi Corazón", the second single from her first work as a soloist.

In July, Agustín announces on his social networks that his single "Desnudas Mi Corazón" will be the official theme of the soap opera "Las Bravo", on TV Azteca, starring Edith González and Mauricio Islas.

=== 2014: "Soy tu doble" y TV host ===
Agustín participates in the first edition of the TV Azteca imitation reality show "SOY TU DOBLE", on 18 August, in which he gets 2nd place. After the program, he strengthened his image on TV Azteca, appearing as a guest on several programs, and as co-host alongside Ingrid Coronado of the second season of La Academia Kids, at the same time appearing as co-host on Canal Total, TotalPlay's main channel. and as a jury for La Academia De Venga La Alegría, sharing the judging panel with the popular host Raquel Bigorra, the renowned entertainment journalist Matilde Obregón and the controversial host of Ventaneando, Ricardo Casares.

=== 2015-17: "Lion King" ===
At the end of 2014, OCESA announces the cast of the new staging of "The Lion King", the Broadway musical set in Mexico City, with Carlos Rivera as the main protagonist, who played the role of Simba. The show premiered in May 2015. With Rivera's retirement, Agustín assumes the leading role of Simba a year after the play premiered.

In September 2017, after almost two years and eight months, the production issued a statement announcing the final weeks of "The Lion King" and with it, the end of the first season under the motto "Thank you Mexico." Argüello concluded his stage in the musical on 14 January 2018, having performed more than 500 roles giving life to Simba.

=== 2018-19: "Los Miserables" ===
At the end of 2017, OCESA announces the cast of the new staging of "Les Misérables", the Broadway musical set in Mexico City, featuring Agustín, in the role of the revolutionary student Marius Pontmercy, premiering on 22 March 2018. After more than 300 performances and a year of performances, on 28 April 2019, the play lowers the curtain, winning a Lunas del Auditorio award for BEST MUSICAL and receiving 13 nominations at the METRO Awards.

=== 2019-20: "La Doña and Mentiras" ===
Before finishing the season of Miserables, Agustín joins the cast of the second season of the "Telemundo" television series "La Doña", at the same time that he debuts as one of the leading roles in the Mexican musical "Mentiras" where he remained until the start of the COVID-19 pandemic.

=== 2020-21: "Ghost and first Best Actor nomination" ===
In the midst of the 2020 COVID Pandemic, the cast of the musical Ghost, based on the film of the same name, was presented. The musical premiered in December 2020 and then re-released in March 2021, due to the health situation in the city due to the pandemic. The first season of the musical closed on July. For that performance, Argüello was nominated for Best Male Performance in a Musical, at the Metropolitan Theater Awards.

=== 2021 – present: "El Rey León España" ===
In July 2021, it is announced that Argüello will be the new protagonist of the musical The Lion King, in Madrid.

In 2022, he would win the award for BEST LEAD ACTOR for his role as Simba at the BroadwayWorld Spain Awards.

After participating in the TV series "La Última" alongside Aitana and Miguel Bernardeu, Agustín performs as Simba in The Lion King. With more than 1,000 performances, he has become the actor who has played Simba the most in the world.

== Discography ==
=== Singles ===
- Una Noche Más (2013)
- Cuánto Más (2013)
- Desnudas Mi Corazón (2014)
- Mejor Suerte La Próxima Vez (2015)
- Muriendo De Amor (2016)
- Tatuaje (2016)
- Lo Que Ya No Está (2017)
- Están En Ti / Él Vive En Ti (2017)
- Noche Sin Fin (2018)
- Sober (2018)
- Todo Vuelve A Empezar (2018)
- Una Razón (2020)

=== Tobby ===
- 2012 - "Tobby"

=== Collaborationss ===
- 2013 - "Cuánto Más" - a dueto con Napoleón Robleto
- 2014 - "Cantemos Ya!" - a dueto con Franki3 Alvarado
- 2017 - "Secret Love Song" - a dueto con Salua Jackson

=== Other ===
- 2009 - "Operación Triunfo 2009: Volumen 1"
- 2009 - "Operación Triunfo 2009: Volumen 2"
- 2009 - "La Nueva Academia"
- 2010 - "Enamórate Con... Azteca Novelas"
- 2012 - "La Academia 10 Años"
- 2015 - "El Rey Leon México"

=== As Composer ===
- 2010 - "Mienteme" - Tobby
- 2013 - "Mi Camino Es Tu Amor" - Canción de la telenovela "Destino"
- 2013 - "Déjame Olvidarte" - Menny Carrasco
- 2013 - "Te Prefiero Perdonar" - Menny Carrasco
- 2013 - "Escapémonos" - Manuel Paz
- 2014 - "Mi Primer Sí" - Melany
- 2014 - "Mi Destino" - Jesús Figueroa
- 2015 - "Si Tú Te Vas" - Urband5

== Filmography ==
=== Reality Shows ===
- Telefe
- 2009 - Operación Triunfo 2009 - Argentina (Finalist - 3rd Place)
- TV Azteca
- 2009 - La Nueva Academia - México (Finalist - 4th Place)
- 2010 - Segunda opportunidad (Winner)
- 2014 - Soy tu doble 2 (Runner-up)

=== TV ===
- Disney+
  - 2022 - La Última: Ídolo
- Telemundo
  - 2020 - La Doña: Eduardo Pérez Urresti
- TV Azteca
  - 2010: Quiéreme tonto
  - 2010/11 - Lo que callamos las mujeres (Unitario)
    - 2010: Capítulo "Y Si Mi Novio Se Enoja"
    - 2010: Capítulo: "Ni Quiero Ni Me Importa"
    - 2011: Capítulo: "Un Error Demasiado Caro"

=== HOST ===
- TV Azteca
- 2013 - La vida es una canción
- 2014 – La Academia Kids 2
- 2014 – "Canal Total" (TotalPlay)

=== Other appearances ===
- TV Azteca
- 2012 – "La Academia Centroamérica" (Guest Jury)
- 2014 – "La Academia De Venga la Alegría" (Jury)
- Televisa
- 2016 - "Recuerda y gana" (Contestant)

== Theatre ==
- 2009 - "Mamma Mia!" (Especial Appearance)
- 2013 - "Wizard of Oz" (El Hombre De Lata)
- 2014 - "Qué Rico Mambo" (Rosendo Del Mar)
- 2015-17 - "El Rey León" (Simba)
- 2018-19 - "Los Miserables" (Marius Pontmercy)
- 2019-20 - "Mentiras" (Emmanuel)
- 2020-21 - "Ghost: Musical" (Sam)
- 2021-presente - "Lion King" (Simba)

== Accolades ==
	PREMIACIÓN	CEREMONIA	PAIS	PERSONAJE	
2021	Best Actor	Los Metro	México	SAM (Ghost)	Nominee
2022	Best Actor	BroadwayWorld Spain	España	SIMBA (Lion King)	WINNER
