= Anaïs Schaaff =

Spanish screenwriter

Anaïs Schaaff i Moll (born 13 March 1974) is a Spanish television writer and producer.

== Biography ==
Schaaff was born in Barcelona to television director and producer Sergi Schaaff (1937–2023) and actress Àngels Moll (born 1944), and has a sister Abigail who is a director. She graduated in the humanities from the Pompeu Fabra University before studying writing and direction at the Institut del Teatre.

Unable to make a living from theatre, Schaaff asked for television work from her father, the creator and director of the Televisión Española (TVE) game show Saber y ganar. She then passed an audition to write for the children's programme Los Lunnis, and wrote for the first three seasons of the Catalan language drama series Ventdelplà. There, she met Javier Olivares, with whom she created and wrote the detective series Kubala, Moreno i Manchón (2012–2014), also co-operating on Isabel (a 2012 historical drama about Isabella I of Castile) and the 1940s-set period drama La sonata de silencio (2016).

In 2013, Schaaff and Olivares set up the production company Cliffhanger TV, responsible for the science fiction series El ministerio del tiempo which ran on La 1 from 2015 to 2020. She was also a producer and wrote an accompanying novel for the series.

Schaaff was the creator of La última, a five-episode 2022 musical drama directed by her sister and starring singer Aitana in her first acting role. It was the first series from Spain to be streamed by Disney+, being titled Our Only Chance in English.
