= Sergi Schaaff =

Spanish television director (1937–2023)

Sergi Schaaff i Casals (17 July 1937 – 3 January 2023) was a Spanish television producer and director for Televisión Española (TVE). He worked for the corporation for 60 years, on programmes including the game show Saber y ganar, which he created in 1997.

== Biography ==
Born in Barcelona, Schaaff graduated in Information Sciences from the Autonomous University of Barcelona (UAB) and began working for Televisión Española (TVE) in 1963. His work covered a wide variety of genres, including drama, adaptations of theatre, documentaries and musical programmes, but he specialised in game shows. He created Saber y ganar, presented by Jordi Hurtado, which debuted in 1997 and was still running at the time of his death. His other game shows included Si lo sé no vengo (1985–1988; also hosted Hurtado), El tiempo es oro(1987–1992), and 3×4 (1986–1990) with Julia Otero.

Schaaff also worked on Ruta Quetzal (1993) hosted by the adventurer Miguel de la Quadra-Salcedo. His credits also included Catalan language programming such as Terra d'escudella, Festa amb Rosa Maria Sardà and Vídua, però no gaire. The last of these shows, a 1982 comedy, starred his wife Àngels Moll.

Schaaff was a professor at the UAB and at the Pompeu Fabra University. The latter institution awarded him its medal in 2010 for his work in launching their Audiovisual Communication Studies degree and his role as a dean from 2000 to 2004. In April 2014, he received the Creu de Sant Jordi. He said on many occasions that "creators don't retire" and remained working in television at the age of 85.

One of his daughters, Anaïs Schaaff (born 1974), became a screenwriter; another, Abigail, became a director.
