= Laura Caro =

Mexican singer-songwriter, actress, model, former TV host

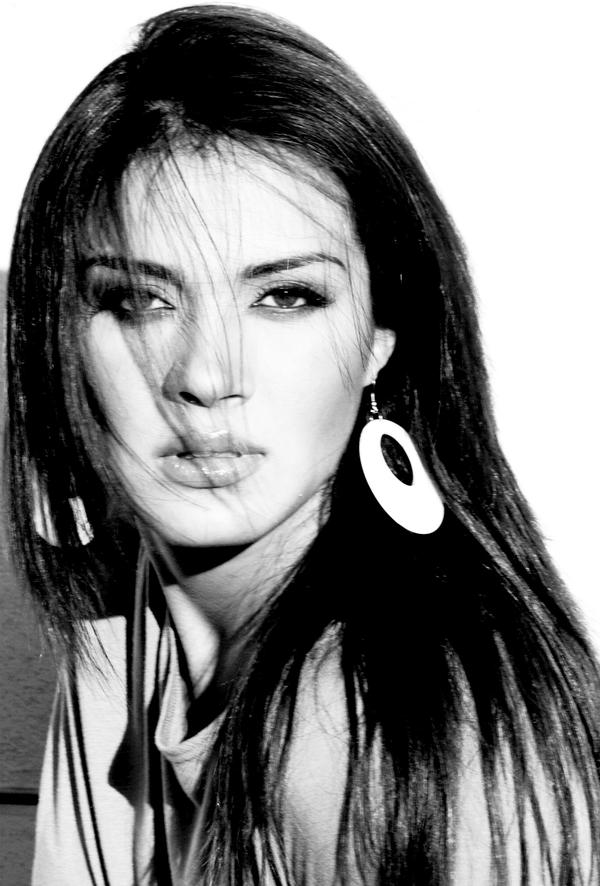

Background information
- Born: Laura Isabel Caro Beltran; December 22, 1983 (age 42); Tijuana, Baja California, Mexico
- Occupations: Singer-songwriter, actress
- Years active: 2002–present
- Musical career
- Genres: Pop, jazz, blues
- Instrument: Vocals
- Label: Unsigned

Laura Isabel Caro Beltran (born December 22, 1983) is a Mexican singer-songwriter, actress, model and former TV host. She is known for her lead role in the 2013 film Here Comes the Devil. In 2016, she became a contestant on Televisa's The Voice.

== Life and musical career ==
Laura Caro was born in Tijuana, Baja California, on December 22, 1983. Daughter of Mrs. Laura Beltran and Mr. Julio Chavarria, Laura is the eldest of three sisters: Sara, Alondra and Dalia. At a young age, she showed a passion for singing, and at the same age she composed her first songs, which she sang and danced at home.

At the age of 18, she chose to study a degree in Systems Engineering but encouraged by her dreams, in July 2002 she made an audition for entrance to the inaugural season of the Mexican reality television La Academia with the song "I Will Always Love You" of Whitney Houston.

Caro was chosen among millions of applicants to be part of La Academia, the musical reality TV show. She made her first appearance on national television in 2002 as a contestant on the Mexican reality television show from TV Azteca. Caro got placed at number nine of the 14 participants of the generation. She is regarded as one of the best female vocals of La Academia.

In 2003, began her journey through music and television, hosting for Azteca America and Telemundo in Los Angeles, California, also she was a candidate to be the new lead vocalist of Limite and to play the lead role in a Venezuelan telenovela. She went on tour with MWR through all the Germany-based US military bases.

After participating in La Academia and finishing a record deal with Azteca Music to record five studio albums, Laura Caro recorded and released two albums, Libelula (Dragonfly) in 2007 and Grandes Exitos (Greatest Hits) in 2009. Caro's albums have been released for sale on her own without a recognized record label.

In 2010, she was a contestant for "Segunda Oportunidad" a reality show produced by TV Azteca and Azteca América that reunites non-winning contestants from La Academia. After 11 dominical episodes, and being captain of the Turquoise team, Caro took runner-up place in the finals. Subsequently, Caro returned to her native Tijuana where she has performed at massive events and presentations alternating with artists such as Guadalupe Pineda, Joan Sebastian, and Francisco Céspedes.

In December 2012, she launched a musical show titled Blue Gardenia in collaboration with the Mexican pianist Robert Salomón. Performing the songs of Caro's favorite singers: Edith Piaf, Eartha Kitt, Etta James, and Aretha Franklin among others to whom they paid tribute. She is actually preparing her third studio album within jazz style.

In 2012, Caro appeared starring in her first feature film, the thriller Here Comes the Devil and was recognized at Fantastic Fest 2012 as Best Actress from a horror film. Caro portrayed a housewife, Sol, who loses their two pre-teen children during a family outing on the outskirts of Tijuana, after the loss, with her partner, they try to find out what happened during the disappearance. The film was written and directed by Adrian Garcia Bogliano who wrote the part of Sol specifically with Caro in mind.

On May 22, 2016, she became a contestant on The Voice (Mexico) and sang "Chasing Pavements" for her blind audition performance. J Balvin turned his chair for her and he becomes as her coach. In the battle rounds, Caro was down against Yuliana Martínez with the song "Don't Leave Me This Way" by Thelma Houston as a disco version. Gloria Trevi made her last steal to put Laura on her Team Trevi. In the knockout rounds, Gloria Trevi eliminated her after she sang "No Se Murió El Amor" of Mijares.

== Filmography ==
=== Film ===
Year	Title	Role	Notes
2013	Here Comes the Devil	Sol	Lead role

=== Television ===
Year	Title	Role	Notes
2002	La Academia	Contestant	Season 1
2003	Desafio de Estrellas	Contestant	8th. place
2003	Homenaje A...	Contestant	Winner
2004	Detras de La Academia 3ra Generacion	TV host	Azteca America
2005	Detras de los Famosos	TV host	Co-host with Wendolee Ayala
2005	Cante y Gane	TV host	Co-host with El Jarocho
2005	Detras de La Academia USA	TV host	Co-host with Rykardo Hernandez
2006	Mañana Azteca	TV host	Azteca Tijuana
2010	Segunda Oportunidad	Contestant	2nd. place
2016	La Voz México	Contestant	Season 5

== Discography ==
=== Albums ===
Title and details
Libelula
- Type: Debut album
- Released: July 22, 2007
Notes

No.	Title	Length
1.	"Soy Como Soy"	3:29
2.	"Dejarte Ir"	3:41
3.	"Muriendo de Amor"	3:12
4.	"Lo Que Mas Quieres"	4:03
5.	"Games (Spanish version)"	3:36
6.	"Lloro Por Ti"	3:45
7.	"No Puedo Respirar"	3:48
8.	"Sigo"	3:20
9.	"Back To Earth"	4:07
10.	"Games"	3:54
11.	"If Now You Go (Dejarte Ir original version)"	3:29
12.	"Keep On (Sigo original version)"	3:20
13.	"Ten Fe (Hidden track)"	4:21

Title and details
Grandes Exitos
- Type: Covers album
- Released: June 15, 2009
Notes

No.	Title	Length
1.	"Amiga Mia"	4:21
2.	"Acariciame"	3:22
3.	"Perdoname"	4:04
4.	"Una Noche de Copas"	3:59
5.	"No Se Murio el Amor"	4:21
6.	"La Loca"	4:20
7.	"Aqui Quiero Estar (I Don't Want to Miss a Thing)"	4:15
8.	"Hoy Tengo Ganas de Ti"	5:25
9.	"Lloro Por Ti"	3:34
10.	"Quedate"	3:59
11.	"Todo Se Derrumbo"	6:22

=== Singles ===
- "Dance Everybody" (2003)
- "Dejarte Ir" (2007)
- "Muriendo de Amor" (2007)
- "Lo Que Mas Quieres" (2007)
- "Soy Como Soy" (2008)
- "Acariciame" (2009)
- "Quedate" (2009)
- "Lloro Por Ti" (2010)
- "A Corazon Abierto" (2011)
- "Ten Fe" (2012)
- "La Excusa" (2013)
- "Esa Soy Yo" (2013)
- "At Last" (2014)
- "Jurame" (2015)
- "Que Te Vaya Bien" (2016)

== Awards and nominations ==
Year	Award	Category	Result
2012	Fantastic Fest	Best Actress	Winner
2012	TIFF Toronto International Film Fest	Best Actress	Nominated
2013	Raindance Film Festival	Best Actress	Nominated
2014	Fangoria Chainsaw Awards	Best Actress	Nominated
