= Here Comes the Devil =

- Theatrical release poster
- Directed by: Adrián García Bogliano
- Written by: Adrián García Bogliano
- Produced by: Andrea Quiroz
- Starring: Laura Caro; Francisco Barreiro; Michele Garcia
- Cinematography: Ernesto Herrera
- Edited by: Carmen Vargas
- Music by: Julio Pillado
- Production companies: MPI Media Group; Morbido Films; Salto de Fe Films
- Distributed by: MPI Media Group
- Release date: September 11, 2012 (Toronto International Film Festival)
- Running time: 97 minutes
- Country: Mexico
- Language: Spanish

Here Comes the Devil (originally titled Ahí va el diablo) is a 2012 Mexican horror film that was directed by Adrian Garcia Bogliano. The film had its world premiere on September 11, 2012 at the Toronto International Film Festival and stars Francisco Barreiro and Laura Caro as a couple who finds that their children may have been exposed to something completely evil.

== Plot ==
A serial killer attacks a lesbian couple. He kills one girl but is badly wounded by the other. He crawls dying up a large rocky hill and his body is never found.

Years later, on an afternoon family outing at the same hill, adolescent siblings Adolfo (Alan Martinez) and Sara (Michele Garcia) enter a cave and do not return. Their parents, Felix (Francisco Barreiro) and Sol (Laura Caro), are distraught. A local gas station attendant says the hill is cursed and that night there is an unusual earthquake, but the next morning the children are found by the police and the family is reunited.

Returning home, the children start behaving strangely. Consultations with a doctor and a psychologist reveal the possibility of sexual abuse. Felix and Sol suspect Lucio, the local weirdo, assaulted Sara that afternoon on the hill. They confront and kill him, though later discoveries will convince Sol of his innocence. Police suspect the parents of the murder but never indict or arrest them.

One night, abnormal events occur in the house: noises, flickering lights, slamming doors, and the children having unnatural seizures. Sol suspects something out of the ordinary, while Felix clings to mundane explanations and gets a gun for protection. Their differences lead Sol to do subsequent investigations independent of her husband and without always disclosing her motives or findings.

Sol is told that Adolfo and Sara are skipping school and discovers that, dressed in their school uniforms, they are taking the bus back to the hill. She follows them up to the mouth of the cave where they disappeared but does not go in.

The night of Lucio's killing, Sol's friend, Marcia (ignorant of the murderous plan), babysat the kids. The next morning Marcia was inexplicably gone and has been unreachable since. Sol goes to see her and asks what happened that night. Marcia describes the children as being "lifeless," says she was supernaturally assaulted by the devil, and witnessed Adolfo and Sara commit incest.

Early in the morning, Sol returns to the hill and enters the cave where Adolfo and Sara disappeared. She finds their dead bodies, dressed as they were the afternoon they vanished. Staggering outside, she phones Felix who states definitively that he dropped the children off at school a mere fifteen minutes ago.

Deeply shaken, Sol speaks to the gas station attendant who reveals that his daughter was the victim of the serial killer in the opening scene and that when the killer vanished on the hill there was an earthquake just like the night when Adolfo and Sara vanished. He says that "those who dwell there are in search of....people who can be possessed. To them, we're only a shell. They use us to do evil and then throw us away."

Sol lies to her family, telling them school is closed the next day but that she'll stay home with the kids and Felix should go to work as usual. At breakfast, she tranquilizes Adolfo and Sara, dresses them in formal clothes, and props them up at the kitchen table. She is then assaulted by an invisible force and sees dead versions of her children dressed in their cave clothes. Sol turns on the stove gas, drives away, and tells Felix to meet her at the gas station.

Felix and Sol drive up the hill and go into the cave. When Felix sees the bodies of his children dressed as they were the day they disappeared, he shoots his wife then shoots himself. There is an earthquake.

Versions of Felix and Sol return to their car and drive away haltingly, as if it were the driver's first time behind the wheel.

== Reception ==
Critical reception for Here Comes the Devil has been mixed and the movie currently holds a rating of 44% on Rotten Tomatoes, based upon 25 reviews. Twitch Film gave the movie a positive review, commenting that several elements such as the "unusual, lurching changes that the movie goes through as it makes its way towards its finale" made the movie worth watching. Fangoria's Chris Alexander gave it four skulls, stating it was "one of the most interesting, frightening and thoroughly alive—both intellectually and viscerally—works of horror and dread this critic has seen in a very, very long time." In contrast, a reviewer for RogerEbert.com gave the film one star and criticized it for its vagueness, stating that while the movie "hints at the possibility for a 'Sixth Sense'-style plot twist" it wasn't "saying anything significant about anything" and was "just a bunch of stuff about demons, murder, female nudity and violent stabbings that, thankfully, will be exorcised from the memory almost as soon as the end credits finish rolling."

=== Awards ===
- Best Actor at Austin Fantastic Fest (2012, won – Francisco Barreiro)
- Best Actress at Austin Fantastic Fest (2012, won – Laura Caro)
- Best Director at Austin Fantastic Fest (2012, won)
- Best Picture at Austin Fantastic Fest (2012, won)
- Best Screenplay at Austin Fantastic Fest (2012, won)
- Best Feature Film at the Neuchâtel International Fantasy Film Festival (2013, nominated)
- Best Foreign-Language Film at the Fangoria Chainsaw Awards (2014, nominated)
- Best Actor at the Fangoria Chainsaw Awards (2014, nominated – Francisco Barreiro)
