= Chumel Torres =

Mexican YouTuber

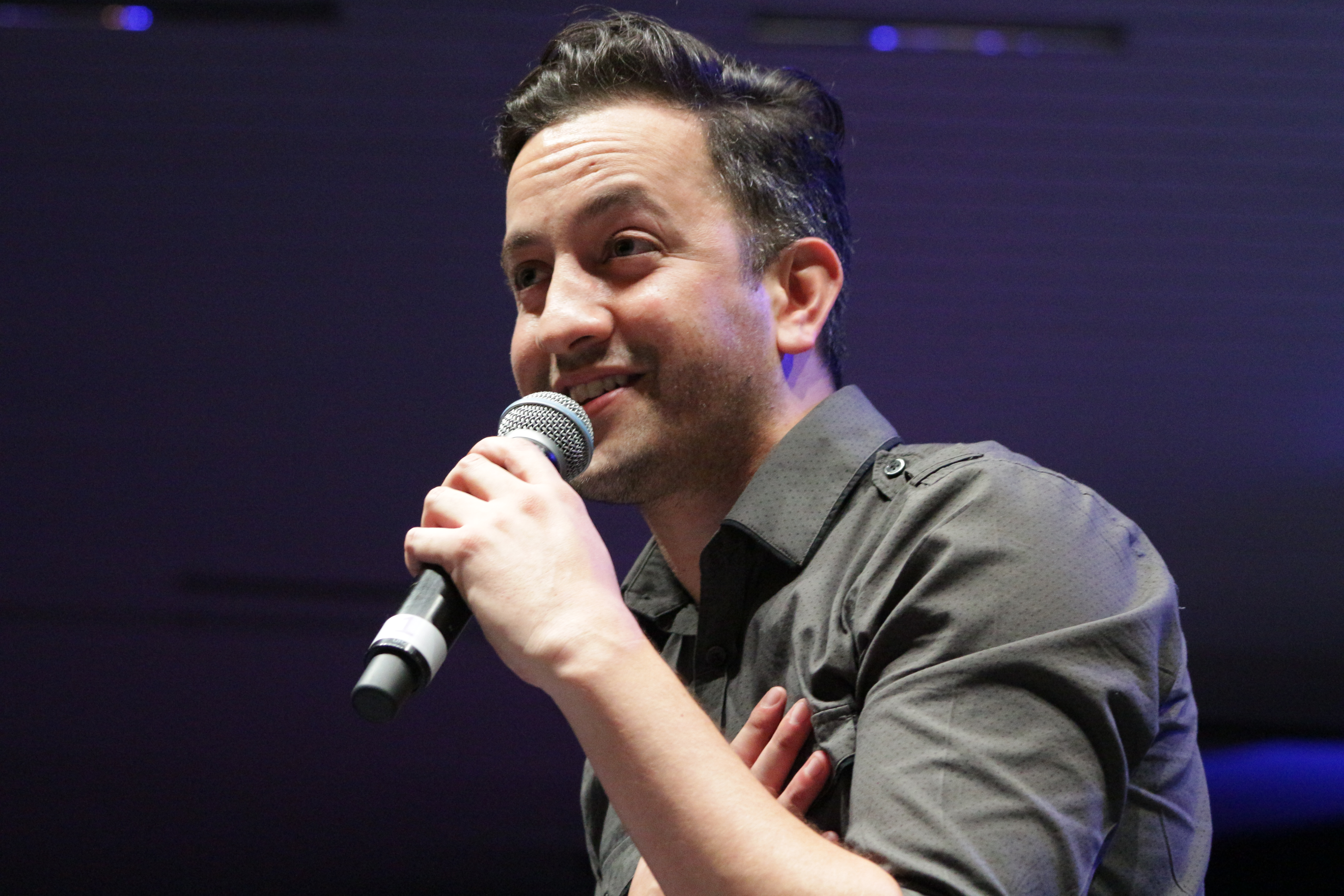
- Torres in 2015
- Born: José Manuel Torres Morales; 7 May 1982 (age 43); Chihuahua City, Chihuahua, Mexico
- Occupation(s): Comedian, YouTuber

José Manuel "Chumel" Torres Morales (born 7 May 1982) is a Mexican comedian and YouTuber.

== Early life and education ==
Torres was born on 7 May 1982 in Chihuahua City, Chihuahua, and graduated from Mechanical Engineering at the Chihuahua Institute of Technology. He worked for eight years in project management of a maquiladora of medical equipment in Chihuahua.

== Career ==
Torres first gained notoriety during the 2012 Mexican general election after he wrote a tweet about a proposal by one of the then-presidential candidates, Andrés Manuel López Obrador, which was retweeted by Gabriel Quadri, another presidential candidate. This led for him to be offered the opportunity to write columns for a blog and a weekly newspaper in Mexico City. After spending some time in the capital, he realized he would rather reach younger and more tech-savvy audiences through a YouTube series, featuring humor with a prominent theme of political satire, focusing on Latin America, specifically Mexico. He says that he will never move to mainstream television channels to keep his fan base and to prevent being called a "sell out".

Torres says he will not report on stories about drug lords out of fear of lawsuits or murder.

As a presenter, he hosted the 2017 MTV Millennial Awards and the 2018 Los Metro Awards.
