= Our Only Chance =

Spanish television series

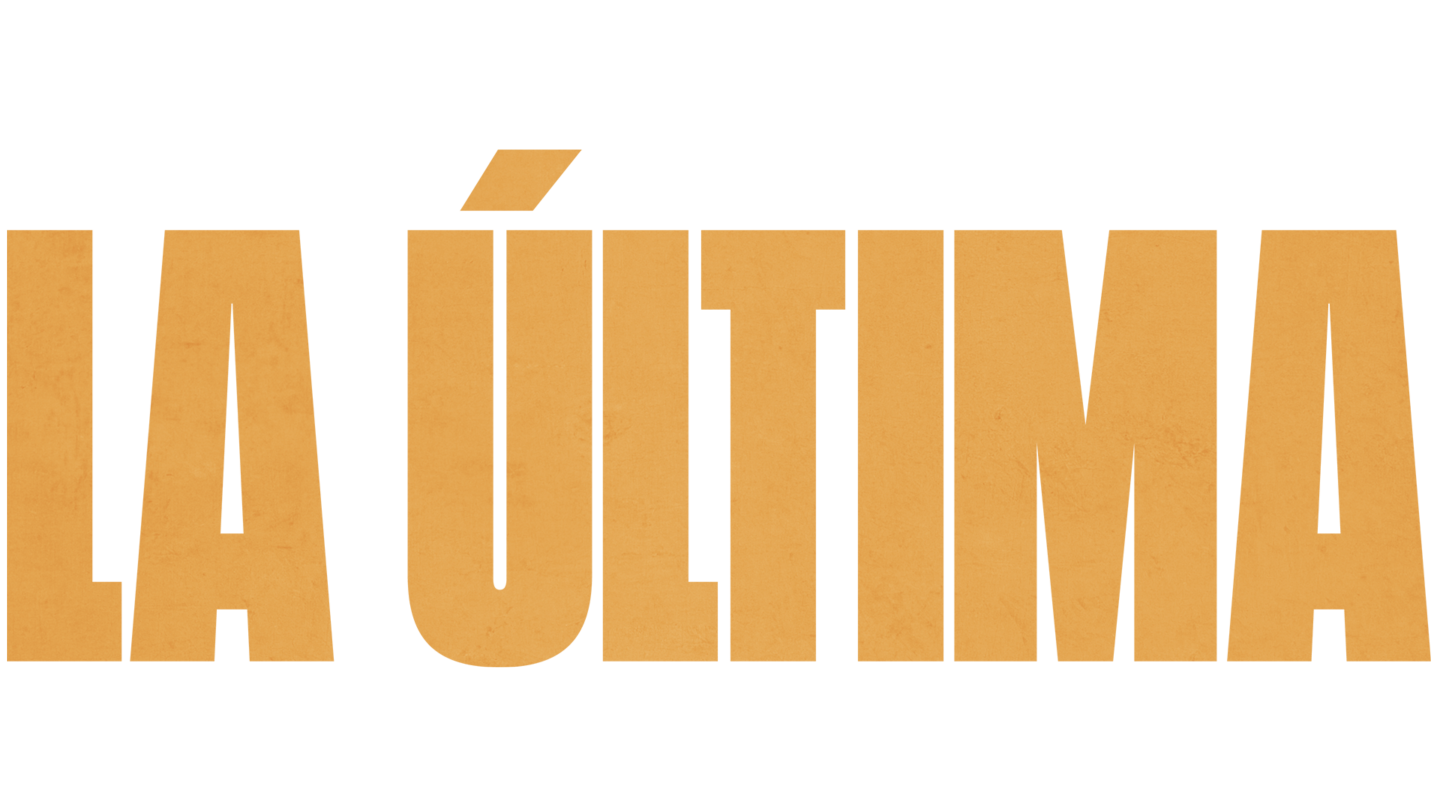
- Spanish: La Última
- Created by: Anaïs Schaaff; Jordi Calafí; Joaquín Oristrell
- Directed by: Eduard Cortés; Abigail Schaaff
- Starring: Aitana Ocaña; Miguel Bernardeau
- Country of origin: Spain
- Original language: Spanish
- No. of seasons: 1
- No. of episodes: 5

Production
- Production company: Grupo Ganga

Original release
- Network: Disney+
- Release: 2 December 2022

Our Only Chance (Spanish: La Última) is a Spanish musical and romantic drama television series created by Anaïs Schaaff, Jordi Calafí, and Joaquín Oristrell for Disney+. The series premiered on 2 December 2022 and stars Aitana Ocaña and Miguel Bernardeau.

== Plot ==
The plot follows the relationship between Candela (a worker for a logistics company and wannabe singer discovered by a record label executive in a bar) and Diego (an aspiring professional boxer and Candela's former high school classmate).

== Cast ==
- Aitana as Candela
- Miguel Bernardeau as Diego
- Aitor Luna
- Luis Zahera
- Jorge Motos as Cristian
- Jelén García
- Sandra Cervera
- Jorge Perugorría
- Óscar de la Fuente
- David Castillo
- Esther Ortega
- Agustin Arguello

== Production and release ==
Created by Anaïs Schaaf, Jordi Calafí, and Joaquín Oristrell, the 5 episode-series is a Grupo Ganga production. Eduard Cortés and Abigail Schaaff took over direction duties. Shooting locations included Madrid and Valencia.

Billed as "the first Disney+ Spanish original series", the aforementioned platform will release the series in Spain (as well as other territories) on 2 December 2022. Likewise, Star+ and Hulu will release the series in Latin America and the United States, respectively.

== Episode list ==
No. overall	No. in season	Title	Original release date
1	1	"A Song to Destiny" (Una canción al destino)	2 December 2022
After a fight, Diego flees from the police. Candela is singing for music producer Fede Ariza. Their first meeting doesn't start well, but there's something special there. Diego can't get out from illegal fighting. Candela begins her path to stardom.
2	2	"I Want" (Quiero)	2 December 2022
Diego leaves the world of illegal fights. As Diego and Candela's friendship could go further, she leaves to record her first singles. Candela is achieving her dream, but she can't stop thinking about Diego.
3	3	"The Last Movie" (La última película)	2 December 2022
Diego and Candela decide that they want to be together. However, there could be conflict. Diego sparring to be the contender for a boxing championship makes him rethink. Candela will be the opening act for an influential artist at a music festival.
4	4	"Broken Hearts" (Corazones rotos)	2 December 2022
Several months have passed since Diego and Candela last saw each other but fate brings them together again. Diego has become the contender for the Spanish boxing title, and Candela is about to start her tour.
5	5	"My Oasis" (Mi oasis)	2 December 2022
The result of Diego's fight is unexpected, which has consequences. Diego tells Candela he won't be able to be with her. Diego never expected that his actions would put Candela at risk. Their path ends at the most crucial moment of their lives.

== Soundtrack ==
La Última (Banda Sonora Original)

Soundtrack album by Aitana
- Released: 2 December 2022
- Recorded: 2022
- Genre: Pop
- Length: 44:21
- Language: Spanish
- Label: Hollywood
- Producer: Mauricio Rengifo: Andrés Torres

Aitana chronology
11 Razones (2020)	La Última (Banda Sonora Original) (2022)

Singles from La Última (Banda Sonora Original)
- 1. "La Última" Released: 10 November 2022

La última (Banda Sonora Original) is the soundtrack album of the series by the same name, released on 2 December 2022 by Hollywood Records. All the songs were produced by Mauricio Rengifo and Andrés Torres. It includes eight songs performed by Aitana and eight acoustic tracks. The title track "La última" was released as a promotional single on 10 November 2022.

=== Track listing ===
All songs written by Aitana, Mauricio Rengifo and Andrés Torres, except where noted.

No.	Title	Writer(s)	Length
1.	"Quiero"		2:30
2.	"El cine"		2:33
3.	"Tu culpa"		2:09
4.	"Oasis"		2:56
5.	"Me levanté"		2:18
6.	"Dormir"		2:42
7.	"A la calle"	Aitana; Rengifo; Torres; Edgar Barrera	2:28
8.	"La última"	Aitana; Rengifo; Torres; Kerli Koiv; Lindy Robbins; Tobias Gad	3:36
9.	"Quiero" (Versión acústica)		2:57
10.	"El cine" (Versión acústica)		2:54
11.	"Tu culpa" (Versión acústica)		2:51
12.	"Oasis" (Versión acústica)		3:00
13.	"Me levanté" (Versión acústica)		2:22
14.	"Dormir" (Versión acústica)		2:33
15.	"A la calle" (Versión acústica)	Aitana; Rengifo; Torres; Barrera	2:37
16.	"La última" (Versión acústica)	Aitana; Rengifo; Torres; Koiv; Robbins; Gad	3:58
Total length:			44:21

- "La última" interpolates "Skyscraper" (2011), written by Toby Gad, Lindy Robbins, and Kerli Koiv and performed by Demi Lovato.

== Personnel ==
- Coordinator [Production Assistant] – Felipe Contreras (6) (tracks: 1 to 8)
- Edited By [Vocal] – Calina Salinas (tracks: 1 to 8), Iñaki de las Cuevas (tracks: 9 to 16)
- Engineer [Recording] – Andrés Torres (tracks: 1 to 8), Mauricio Rengifo (tracks: 1 to 8)
- Engineer [Vocals] – Camilo Aristizábal (tracks: 1 to 8)
- Graphic Design, Creative Director – Universo Creativo_Equipo Sopa
- Associated Performer, Piano – Max Borghetti (tracks: 9 to 16)
- Associated Performer, Guitar – Tito Ruelas (tracks: 9 to 16)
- Lead Vocals – Aitana
- Mastered By – Marco A. Ramírez (tracks: 9 to 16)
- Mixed By – Camilo Froideval (tracks: 9 to 16)
- Mixed By, Mastered By – Tom Norris (tracks: 1 to 8)
- Photography By – Gorka Postigo
- Producer [Vocals] – Pablo Cebrián (tracks: 9 to 16)
- Producer, Arranged By – Dan Zlotnik (tracks: 9 to 16)
- Producer, Arranged By, Piano – Camilo Froideval (tracks: 9 to 16)
- Producer, Programmed By, Arranged By, Guitar, Keyboards – Andrés Torres (2) (tracks: 1 to 8)
- Producer, Programmed By, Arranged By, Vocals [Additional] – Mauricio Rengifo (tracks: 1 to 8)
- Video Director – Bàrbara Farré (tracks: 1,16)
- Written-By – Aitana Ocaña, Andrés Torres, Edgar Barrera (tracks: 7, 15), Mauricio Rengifo, Toby Gad, Lindy Robbins, and Kerli Koiv (tracks: 1,16)
- Phonographic Copyright ℗ – Hollywood Records, Inc.
- Copyright © – Hollywood Records, Inc.
- Marketed By – Universal Music Spain, S.L.U.
- Distributed By – Universal Music Spain, S.L.U.
- Glass Mastered At – MPO
- Published By – Walt Disney Music Company
- Published By – Wonderland Music Company, Inc.
- Recorded At – Eagle Pop Studios, Los Angeles, CA
- Recorded At – Metropol Studios, Madrid
- Recorded At – Topetitud Estudios
- Mastered At – Britannia Road Studio

=== Charts ===
==== Weekly charts ====
Weekly chart performance for La Última (OST)
Chart (2022)	Peak position
Spanish Albums (Promusicae)	4

==== Year-end charts ====
2022 year-end chart performance for La Última (OST)
Chart (2022)	Position
Spanish Albums (PROMUSICAE)	42

2023 year-end chart performance for La Última (OST)
Chart (2023)	Position
Spanish Albums (PROMUSICAE)	55

=== Certifications ===
Certifications for La Última (OST)
Region	Certification	Certified units/sales
Spain (Promusicae)	Gold	20,000^{‡}
^{‡} Sales+streaming figures based on certification alone.
