= Jordi Hurtado =

Spanish broadcaster and voice actor

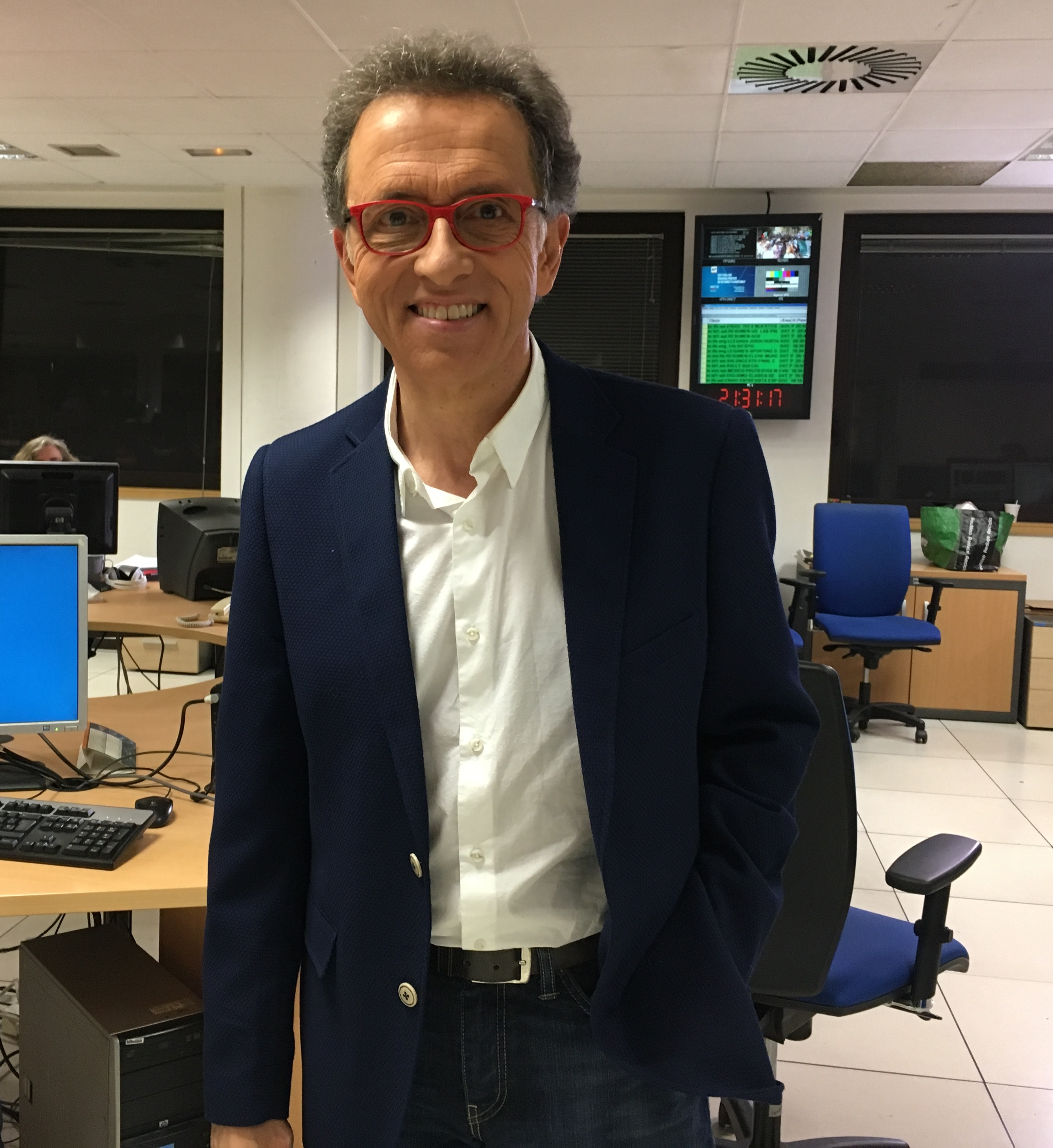
- Jordi Hurtado in 2017
- Born: Jordi Hurtado Torres; 16 June 1957 (age 68); Sant Feliu de Llobregat (Barcelona), Spain
- Occupations: TV Presenter, Radio Personality
- Years active: 1985–present

Jordi Hurtado Torres (Sant Feliu de Llobregat, Barcelona, 16 June 1957) is a Spanish radio and television presenter and voice actor. He is popular in Spain thanks to Televisión Española shows like Si lo sé no vengo and Saber y ganar.

He has received numerous accolades throughout his career in television, including the Lifetime Achievement Award presented by the Spanish Television Academy in 2024, and the National Television Award presented by the Spanish Ministry of Culture in 2025.

As of 2023 he has been the host of Saber y ganar for 25 years.

== Career ==
=== Radio ===
Date	Title	Network	Notes
1982	Radio al sol	Radio Barcelona (Cadena SER)	Premio Ondas 1982
1990	La alegría de la casa		

=== Television ===
Date	Title	Network	Notes
1985–1988	Si lo sé no vengo	Televisión Española	Host with Virginia Mataix, Directed by Sergi Schaaff
1989–1990	La liga del millón	Televisión Española	Host. Section of Estudio estadio
1991	Pictionary	Televisión Española	Host
1992	Carros de juego	Televisión Española	Host
1993	Juguemos al Trivial	Televisión Española	Host
1994	¿Cómo lo hacen?	Televisión Española	Host with Almudena Ariza
1997–present	Saber y ganar	Televisión Española	Host. Directed by Sergi Schaaff
13 April 2015	El ministerio del tiempo	Televisión Española	Cameo as himself in Episode 8

== Trivia ==
The fact that he has been on television for so long without having aged significantly has given rise to all sorts of jokes and memes about him being immortal, a robot, a hologram, or even a Zombie, as seen in the Fox TV ad for The Walking Dead.
