= Los Metro =

Theatre awards ceremony in Mexico

Premios Metropolitanos de Teatro
- Awarded for: Excellence in theatre in Mexico
- Country: Mexico
- Presented by: Academia Metropolitana de Teatro
- First award: August 28, 2018; 8 years ago
- Website: losmetro.mx

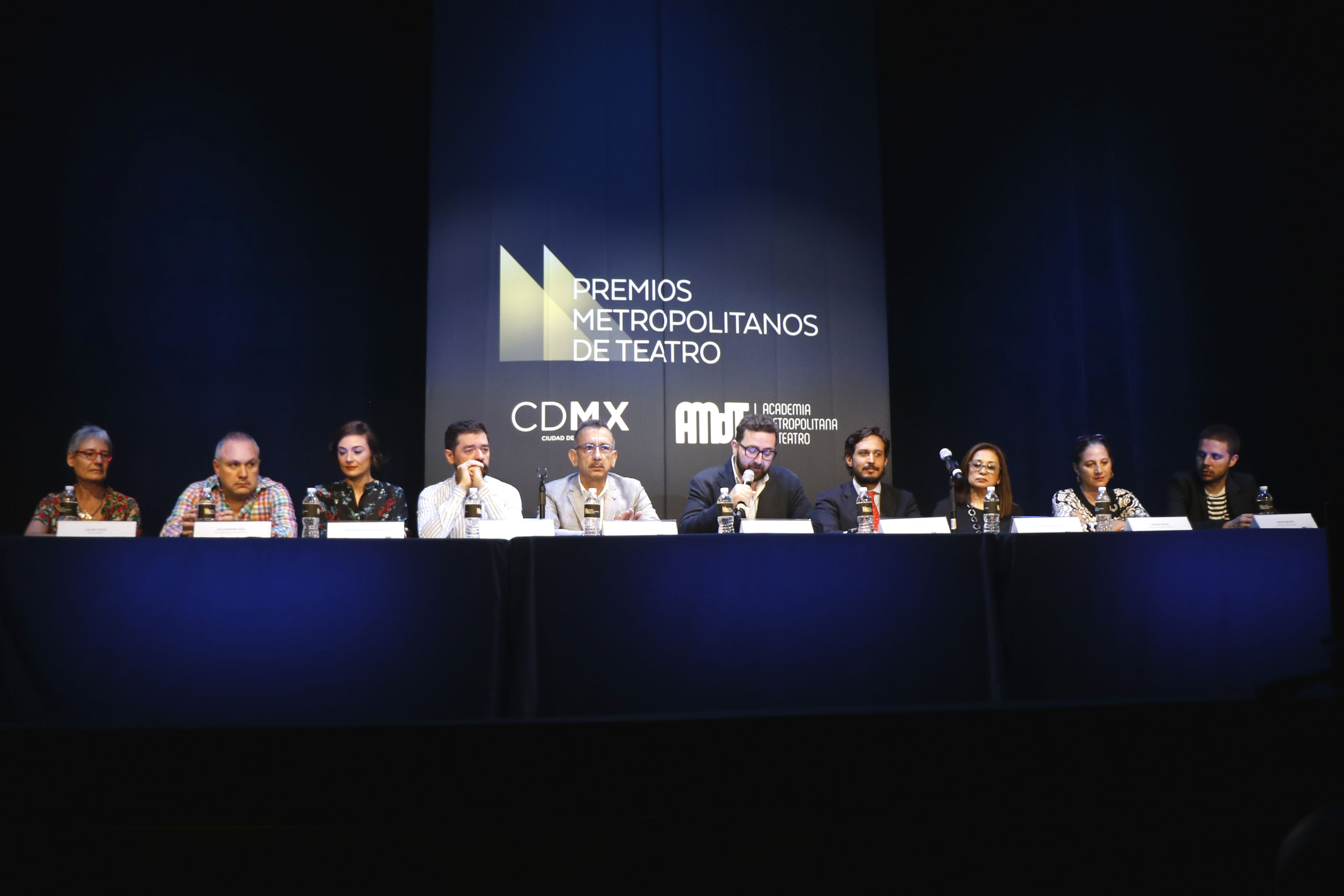
2017 Metropolitan Theatre Awards Press Conference

The Metropolitan Theatre Awards (Spanish: Premios Metropolitanos de Teatro), commonly known as Premios Los Metro or simply Los Metro, is an annual ceremony which honors theatre performers, live productions, digital theatre and stagecraft in Mexico City only. It is important to mention that the productions noted in these awards are only local productions in Mexico City and not Mexico as a country.

Since 2018 there have been four ceremonies held in Mexico City with a television broadcast covered by MVS TV. The awards are also broadcast digitally through YouTube.

== History ==
The awards were established in 2017 by the Academia Metropolitana de Teatro as an annual ceremony with support of the Secretariat of Culture of Mexico and the Secretariat of Tourism of Mexico City, and were first held in 2018. Plans for a ceremony in 2020 were suspended in response to the COVID-19 pandemic. The awards are set to resume in 2021.

Edition	Date	Venue	Host
1st	August 28, 2018	Teatro de la Ciudad	Chumel Torres
2nd	August 21, 2019	Teatro Telcel	Michelle Rodríguez
3rd	November 24, 2021	Teatro Ángel Peralta	Alan Estrada
4th	October 18, 2022		Regina Blandón

== Categories ==
As of 2021, 34 categories are awarded, with different categories for original plays created in Mexico and local adaptations of international productions. A lifetime achievement award is presented as a non-competitive category with the backing of Mexico's Secretariat of Culture.

Nominees are decided by an internal committee, while winners are voted by a jury of a rotating group of theatre professionals.

Winning nominees are awarded a silver-plated trophy designed by Mexican-Peruvian sculptor Aldo Chaparro, with one category offering a monetary prize for independent producers and theatre associations.
