= Dulce (Mexican singer) =

Mexican singer and actress (1955–2024)

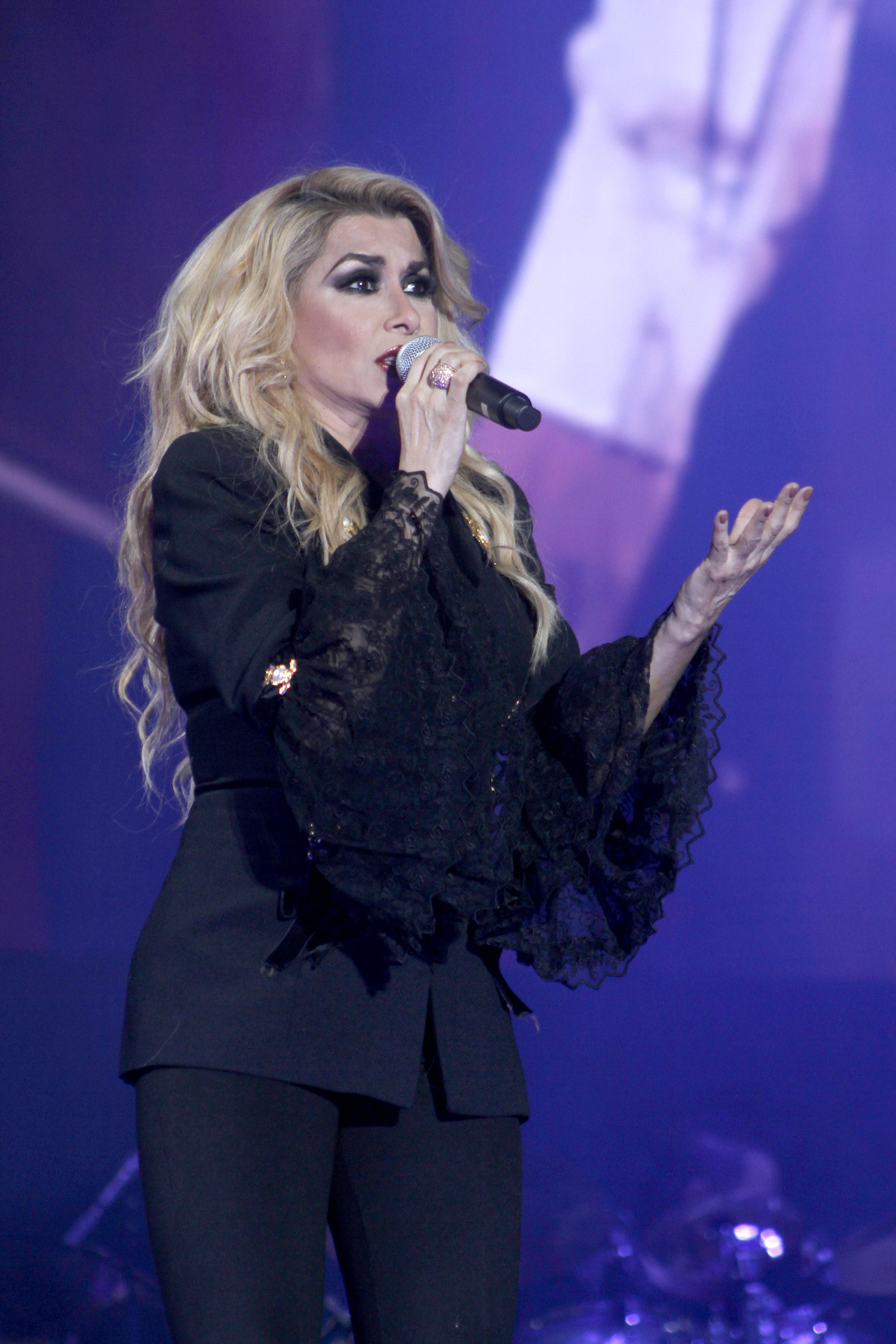
- Dulce in 2019
- Born: July 29, 1955; Matamoros, Tamaulipas, Mexico
- Died: December 25, 2024 (aged 69); Mexico City, Mexico
- Occupations: Singer, actress
- Years active: 1974–2024

Bertha Elisa Noeggerath Cárdenas (July 29, 1955 – December 25, 2024), known professionally as Dulce, was a Mexican singer and actress.

== Life and career ==
At a young age, she moved to Monterrey, Nuevo León to study psychology. She began her musical career there with the band "Toby and His Friends" on September 15, 1974. Later, with the support of the singer José José, she began working as a soloist in Mexico City. She travelled to Spain in 1978, to compete at the Mallorca Festival with the song "Señor Amor".

Dulce died from complications of lung cancer in Mexico City, on December 25, 2024, at the age of 69.

== Discography ==
=== Albums ===
- La voz con alma (1976)
- Aquella edad (1977)
- Triunfadora de Mallorca (1978)
- Dulce (1979)
- Heridas (1982)
- Tu muñeca (1984)
- Lobo (1985)
- Salvaje (1987)
- Invitación al amor (1988)
- Castillos de cristal (1988)
- Ay, amor… (1990)
- Cosas prohibidas (1991)
- Testigo de una noche (1993)
- Homenaje a Camilo Sesto (2006)
