= Saber y ganar =

Spanish television quiz show

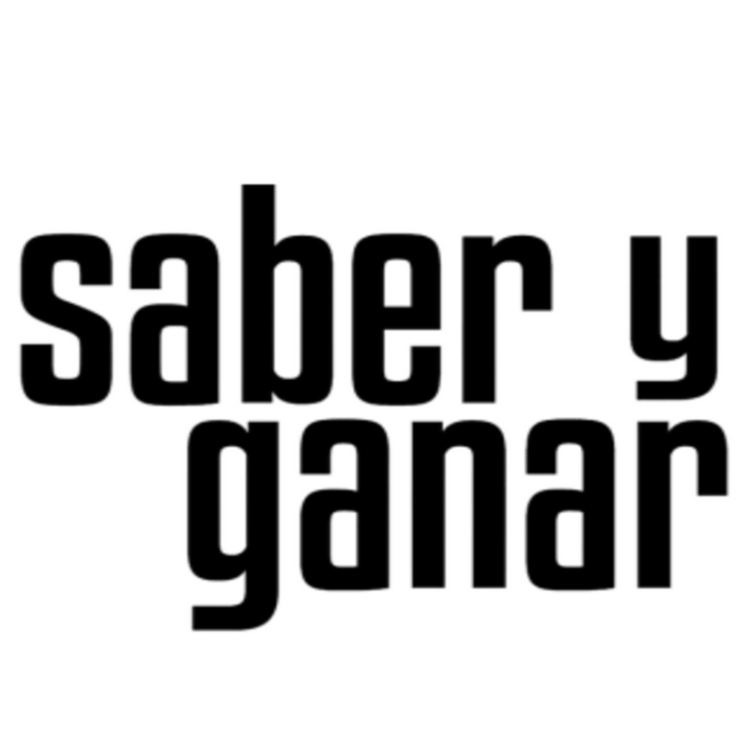
- Genre: Quiz show
- Created by: Sergi Schaaff
- Directed by: Sergi Schaaff (1997–2023); Abigail Schaaff (2023–present)
- Presented by: Jordi Hurtado
- Starring: Pilar Vázquez
- Voices of: Juanjo Cardenal (1997–2021); Elisenda Roca (2021–present)
- Opening theme: "Saber y Ganar"
- Country of origin: Spain
- Original language: Spanish
- No. of seasons: 28 (Daily edition); 14 (Weekend edition)
- No. of episodes: 6,602 (10 January 2025; Daily); 1,256 (12 January 2025; Weekend)

Production
- Running time: 35–40 minutes
- Production companies: RTVE; Producciones Quart S.A.

Original release
- Network: La 2
- Release: 17 February 1997 – present

Saber y ganar ("To Know And To Win"), is a Spanish cultural television quiz show created by Sergi Schaaff and hosted by Jordi Hurtado, which has been broadcast on La 2 of Televisión Española since 1997. It is the longest running daily game show in the history of television in Spain.

== Format ==
During the show's duration, three contestants compete in different tests where they have to answer trivia-like questions, putting their mental, reasoning and memory abilities to the test. Most of the questions have a moderate level of difficulty and are spread over six different games: "Cada sabio con su tema" (literally Each wise man with his subject), where each contestant answers questions about a given topic of their choice; "La pregunta caliente" (The hot question), where contestants must answer random questions and choosing who, of the other two contestants, must answer them; "El duelo" (The Duel), where two contestants answer questions about a topic that changes daily; "La parte por el todo" (The fraction for the Whole), where the contestants must figure out what an image, piece of text or piece of music belongs to; "La calculadora humana" (The human calculator), where the contestant with the second highest score must answer seven basic arithmetic operations in 50 seconds in order to keep his/her earnings for the day; and finally "El reto" (The Challenge), where the contestant with the least score has to figure out seven words from their root and definition in order to remain in the game. If the contestant loses the "El Reto", a new individual will be chosen to replace him/her the next episode.

The contestant with the highest score has the chance to solve "La parte por el todo" ("The fraction for the whole"). The contestant with the second highest score must solve "La calculadora humana" in order to keep the points he earned that day. The contestant with the lowest score must solve "El reto" in order to participate the next day.

At the end of each program, the two contestant that have more points automatically qualify to play the next day. The third contestant only qualifies if he answers correctly all the questions in "El reto". The scores are cumulative but start from zero every day. The maximum number of programs a contestant can stay in a row is one hundred.

== Peruvian version ==
Saber y Ganar is a Peruvian television program. Each episode consisted of two hosts ask questions about a theme previously selected by the participant. 5 questions were asked the first night and the following 6th through 10th questions were asked in 5 additional weeks. When a contestant goes into the 9th question the host gives him or her a present for good participation. Answering the 10th question correctly earned the contestant 20,000 soles.
