= La Academia: Segunda Oportunidad =

- Also known as: Segunda Oportunidad
- Presented by: Rafael Araneda, Betty Monroe and Amelia Vega
- Country of origin: Mexico
- No. of episodes: 11

Production
- Running time: 3 hours

Original release
- Network: TV Azteca
- Release: March 21 – June 6, 2010

Segunda Oportunidad (English: Second Chance) was a Mexican reality show produced by TV Azteca and Azteca América that reunited non-winning contestants from the first seven seasons of La Academia as well as La Academia USA and was hosted by Rafael Araneda, Betty Monroe and Miss Universe 2003 Amelia Vega. The 52 contestants, divided into teams of four members each, spent each week at an isolated location learning and developing their artistic skills, then competed against each other during a weekly concert for TV viewers and a live studio audience and face elimination. Producers stated the composition of each team on March 10, 2010. The 52 contestants lived in Emilio "Indio" Fernandez's home.

Only 2 contestants were not announced for the competition, but instead were left six hopeful contestants were placed on an online vote, where viewers needed to choose between Jolette, Azeneth, Anahí, Gerardo, Luis Armando, or Raúl Sandoval. On March 17, 2010, the voting was closed; Anahí and Gerardo were chosen.

On April 25, 2010, Diana Galindo (La Academia USA) asked if she can take part in the program. She has been given the chance through an open vote by the public, where they would decide whether she joined the contest or not. On May 9, during concert 7, Diana became the 53rd contestant.

Melissa, Israel, and Alejandra were placed on an open vote by the public, for breaking the show's rules. The public would decide if they could stay for a second chance or go. During the 7th concert, all three were voted to stay and became the part of a new, 14th group: gray.

== Contestants ==
Contestants on Segunda Oportunidad
Contestant	Place of Origin	Previous		Original Team	Finish (Team / Status)		Rank
Contestant	Place of Origin	Season	Rank	Original Team	Finish (Team / Status)		Rank
Diego Isael Castro Guerrero	Sahuayo, Michoacán	5	12th	9	—N/a	Eliminated by judges Concert 1	53rd
Julia Hernández E.	Paso del Toro, Veracruz	5	6th	6	12	Switched; Concert 1	50th
Patricia "Paty" Hernández Ahjtung	Veracruz	7	12th	12	12	Voted out Concert 1	50th
Blanca Mariana Vargas Grajeda	Mexico/USA	USA	1st	12	12	Voted out Concert 1	50th
Clara Gisela López García	San Luis Potosí, San Luis Potosí	2	17th	7	—N/a	Disqualified; Concert 2	49th
Gerardo Antonio Castillo Orellana	Guatemala, Guatemala	6	16th	9	9	Eliminated by judges Concert 2	46th
Jaccyve Anaid Álvarez	Veracruz	7	8th	9	9	Eliminated by judges Concert 2	46th
Marco Antonio Silva Hernández	Distrito Federal	4	9th	12	9	Eliminated by judges Concert 2	46th
Azucena Anahí García Castro	Monterrey, Nuevo León	4	17th	2	—N/a	Eliminated by captains Concert 3	45th
Luz Mirella Leguizama	Oakland, California	7	10th	3	—N/a	Eliminated by captains Concert 3	44th
Iván Estrada Quintanar	Coyoacán, Estado de México	6	12th	6	—N/a	Eliminated by judges Concert 3	43rd
Andrea González Romo	Guadalajara, Jalisco	2	9th	4	3	Switched; Concert 3	40th
Esteban Velázquez	Odessa, Texas	6	10th	3	3	Voted out Concert 3	40th
Héctor Agustín Zamorano Guitar	Veracruz, Veracruz	1	14th	3	3	Voted out Concert 3	40th
Ana Lucía Salazar Garza	Monterrey, Nuevo León	2	11th	11	11	Voted out Concert 4	37th
Carlos Pleasent Delgado	Aguascalientes, Aguascalientes	7	17th	2	11	Voted out Concert 4	37th
Cintia Maribel Urtiaga Peña	Puerto Vallarta, Jalisco	6	11th	11	11	Voted out Concert 4	37th
Ada Abyadé Rodríguez Andrade	Guadalajara, Jalisco y Zapopan, Jalisco	4	13th	1	1	Voted out Concert 5	34th
Karla Lizbeth Leyva Tijerina	Ciudad Obregón, Sonora	2	16th	1	1	Voted out Concert 5	34th
Perla Isabel Estrada Hernández	Caborca, Sonora	6	5th	6	1	Voted out Concert 5	34th
Héctor Silva del Castillo	Monterrey, Nuevo León	6	14th	13	13	Voted out Concert 6	30th
José Luis Díaz Solórzano	Guadalajara, Jalisco	4	8th	13	13	Voted out Concert 6	30th
Nohelia María Sosa Guerrero	Honduras/USA	USA	3rd	7	13	Switched; Concert 6	30th
Wilfredo Pineda Gastelum	Culiacán, Sinaloa	6	9th	10	13	Voted out Concert 6	30th
Yadhira Elizabeth Méndez	Aguascalientes	7	16th	7	—N/a	Voted out Concert 7	29th
José Antonio de la O Saldivar	Ciudad Victoria, Tamaulipas	1	11th	10	7	Voted out Concert 8	26th
Norma Irene "Mayrenne" Carvajal	Veracruz	7	16th	2	7	Voted out Concert 8	26th
Rodrigo Eduardo "Rod" Pérez Mendoza	Mérida, Yucatán	7	11th	13	7	Voted out Concert 8	26th
Diana Santos Ugalde	Chihuahua, Chihuahua	5	15th	8	—N/a	Eliminated by opposing captain Concert 9	25th
Manuel Mancillas Dena	Hermosillo, Sonora	2	3rd	1	—N/a	Disqualified; Concert 9	24th
Sandra Wendolee Ayala González	Torreón, Coahuila	1	12th	4	6	Voted out Concert 9	23rd
Alba del Carmen Alcudia Oriano	Nacajuca, Tabasco	6	15th	5	—N/a	Eliminated by opposing captain Concert 10	22nd
Marla Hiromi Hayakawa Salas	Torreón, Coahuila	3	7th	9	8	Voted out Concert 10	20th
Mario Alberto González Sepúlveda	Monterrey, Nuevo León	4	12th	8	8	Voted out Concert 10	20th
Diana Galindo	Mexico/USA	USA	10th	10	10	Fourth runner(s)-up Concert 11	5th
Dulce María López Rodríguez	México, Distrito Federal	3	2nd	1	10	Fourth runner(s)-up Concert 11	5th
Francisco "Frankie" Alvarado Rivera	Puerto Rico/USA	USA	7th	8	10	Fourth runner(s)-up Concert 11	5th
Rogelio "Roy" Rosas Moreno	Nogales, Sonora	7	16th	10	10	Fourth runner(s)-up Concert 11	5th
Daniel "Lingo Lingo" Solís Cruz	Ciudad Obregón, Sonora y Tecate, Baja California	7	14th	5	5	Third runner(s)-up Concert 11	4th
Édgar Guerrero Gastelum	Burley / Boise, Idaho	4	5th	13	5	Third runner(s)-up Concert 11	4th
Miguel Ángel "Mike" Bobadilla	Culiacán, Sinaloa	7	9th	5	5	Third runner(s)-up Concert 11	4th
Alejandra Capellini Blasquez	Jalapa, Veracruz	7	13th	4	14	Second runner(s)-up Concert 11	3rd
Israel Estrada Quintanar	Atizapán, Estado de México	3	5th	8	14	Second runner(s)-up Concert 11	3rd
Ericka Melissa Marta Ibarra Murrieta	Hermosillo, Sonora	3	3rd	12	14	Second runner(s)-up Concert 11	3rd
David Napoleón Robleto	Guatemala	7	2nd	11	14	Second runner(s)-up Concert 11	3rd
Adrián Eduardo Varela Avilés	Culiacán, Sinaloa	4	3rd	7	2	Runner(s)-up; Concert 11	2nd
César Robles Hinojosa	Acayucan, Veracruz	3	6th	11	2	Runner(s)-up; Concert 11	2nd
Laura Isabel Caro Beltrán	Tijuana, Baja California	1	9th	2	2	Runner(s)-up; Concert 11	2nd
Gerardo Matías Aranda García	Córdoba, Argentina	6	8th	10	2	Runner(s)-up; Concert 11	2nd
Agustín Alejandro Argüello	Córdoba, Argentina	7	4th	3	4	Winner(s); Concert 11	1st
Manuel Alejandro "Menny" Carrasco de la O	Chihuahua, Chihuahua	7	5th	4	4	Winner(s); Concert 11	1st
Óscar Jiménez Mejía	Guadalajara, Jalisco	7	6th	5	4	Winner(s); Concert 11	1st
Sebastián Martingaste	Buenos Aires, Argentina	7	2nd	6	4	Winner(s); Concert 11	1st

== Teams ==
=== Members ===
Members of each team
1	2	3	4	5	6	7	8	9	10	11	12	13	14
~~Abyadé~~	~~Anahí~~ ~~Wendolee~~ ^{6} César	Agustín ^{4}	Alejandra ^{10} Matías ^{2} Menny	~~Alba~~	~~Iván~~ César ^{2} ~~Wendolee~~	Adrián ^{2} ~~José Antonio~~	~~Diana S.~~ ~~Mario~~	~~Diego~~ ~~Marco A.~~	~~José Antonio~~ ^{2} ~~Mayrenne~~ ^{7} **Frankie**	~~Ana Lucía~~	Marco A. ^{9}	Édgar ^{7} Yadhira ^{7} Édgar ^{7} ~~Wilfredo~~	Alejandra
Dulce L. ^{4} ~~Wendolee~~ ^{2}	Carlos ^{11} Napoleón ^{14} Menny ^{4} Matías	~~Esteban~~	~~Andrea~~ Agustín	Daniel	~~Julia~~ Melissa ^{8} Israel ^{6} Menny ^{2}	~~Gisela~~ ~~Hiromi~~ ^{8} Frankie ^{10} ~~Mayrenne~~	Frankie ^{7} ~~Hiromi~~	~~Gerardo~~	Matías ^{4} Alejandra ^{14} Dulce L.	César ^{6}	~~Mariana~~	~~Héctor S.~~	**Israel**
~~Karla~~	**Laura**	~~Héctor Z.~~	Menny ^{6} Israel ^{14} Óscar	Mike	~~Perla~~ ^{1} ~~Manuel~~	~~Nohelia~~ ~~Rodrigo~~	Israel ^{6} Melissa ^{14}	~~Hiromi~~ ^{7}	Roy	~~Cintia~~	Melissa ^{6}	~~José Luis~~	Melissa
Manuel ^{6} ~~Perla~~	Mayrenne ^{10} José Antonio ^{7} Adrián	~~Luz~~	~~Wendolee~~ ^{1} Dulce L. ^{8} Mario ^{6} Sebastián	Óscar ^{10} Wilfredo ^{13} **Édgar**	Sebastián ^{4} ~~Mario~~ ^{8}	~~Yadhira~~ ^{13} Édgar ^{13} ~~Yadhira~~	~~Mario~~ ^{4} Dulce L. ^{10}	~~Jaccyve~~	~~Wilfredo~~ ^{5} Óscar ^{4} Diana G.	Napoleón ^{2} ~~Carlos~~	~~Patricia~~	Rodrigo ^{7}	Napoleón

- Italics represent the contestant switched to another team.
- Bold represents the contestant is/was the captain of the team.
- Strikethrough represents the contestant was eliminated.

=== Finale Teams ===
02	04	05	10	14
**Laura**	**Agustin**	**Edgar**	**Frankie**	**Israel**
Adrian	Menny	Daniel	Diana Galindo	Melissa
Matias	Oscar	Mike	Roy	Ale
Cesar	Sebastian		Dulce López	Napoleon

=== Group Members ===
Group 1: Purple...Eliminated

- Dulce López Concert 1-Concert 5
- Karla Concert 1-Concert 5
- Manuel Concert 1-Concert 4
- Abyade Concert 1-Concert 5
- Perla (replacement for Manuel) Concert 5
- Wendolee (replacement for Dulce López) Concert 5

Group 2: Turquoise

- Laura Concert 1-Concert 11
- Mayrenne Concert 1-Concert 6
- Carlos Concert 1-Concert 4
- Anahi Concert 1-Concert 3
- Napoleon (replacement for Carlos) Concert 5-Concert 9
- Wendolee (replacement for Anahi) Concert 6-Concert 8
- Jose Antonio (replacement for Mayrenne) Concert 7
- Adrian (replacement for Jose Antonio) Concert 8-Concert 11
- Cesar (replacement for Wendolee) Concert 9-Concert 11
- Menny (replacement for Napoleon) Concert 10
- Matias (replacement for Menny) Concert 11

Group 3: Red...Eliminated

- Agustin Concert 1-Concert 3
- Hector Concert 1-Concert 3
- Esteban Concert 1-Concert 3
- Luz Concert 1-Concert 3
- Andrea Concert 3 (Switched)

Group 4: Yellow

- Menny Concert 1-Concert 7 and Concert 11
- Andrea Concert 1-Concert 3
- Wendolee Concert 1-Concert 5
- Ale Concert 1-Concert 4
- Agustin (replacement for Andrea) Concert 4-Concert 11
- Matias (replacement for Ale) Concert 5-Concert 10
- Dulce López (replacement for Wendolee) Concert 6-Concert 8
- Oscar (replacement for Menny) Concert 8-Concert 11
- Mario (replacement for Dulce) Concert 9
- Sebastian (replacement for Mario) Concert 10-Concert 11

Group 5: Green Military

- Daniel Concert 1-Concert 11
- Alba Concert 1-Concert 10
- Oscar Concert 1-Concert 5
- Mike Concert 1-Concert 11
- Wilfredo (replacement for Oscar) Concert 6
- Edgar (replacement for Wilfredo) Concert 7-Concert 11

Group 6: Orange...Eliminated

- Sebastian Concert 1-Concert 9
- Perla Concert 1-Concert 4
- Julia Concert 1
- Ivan Concert 1-Concert 3
- Melissa (replacement for Julia) Concert 2-Concert 5
- Manuel (replacement for Perla) Concert 5-Concert 9
- César (replacement for Ivan) Concert 5-Concert 8
- Israel (replacement for Melissa) Concert 6-Concert 7
- Menny (replacement for Israel) Concert 8-Concert 9
- Wendolee (replacement for Cesar) Concert 9
- Mario (replacement for Sebastian) Concert 9

Group 7: Black...Eliminated

- Adrian Concert 1-Concert 7
- Gisela Concert 1-Concert 2
- Yadhira Concert 1-Concert 4 and Concert 6-Concert 7
- Nohelia Concert 1-Concert 6
- Hiromi (replacement for Gisela) Concert 3-Concert 6
- Edgar (replacement for Yadhira) Concert 5
- Frankie (replacement for Hiromi) Concert 7-Concert 8
- Rodrigo (replacement for Nohelia) Concert 7-Concert 8
- José Antonio (replacement for Adrian) Concert 8
- Mayrenne (replacement for Frankie) Concert 8

Group 8: White

- Israel Concert 1-Concert 5
- Diana Concert 1-Concert 9
- Frankie Concert 1-Concert 6
- Mario Concert 1-Concert 8 and Concert 10
- Melissa (replacement for Israel) Concert 6-Concert 7
- Hiromi (replacement for Frankie) Concert 7-Concert 10
- Dulce (replacement for Mario) Concert 9-Concert 10

Group 9: Royal Blue...Eliminated

- Hiromi Concert 1-Concert 2
- Jaccyve Concert 1-Concert 2
- Diego Concert 1
- Gerardo Concert 1-Concert 2
- Marcos (replacement for Diego) Concert 2

Group 10: Lilac

- Jose Antonio Concert 1-Concert 6
- Wilfredo Concert 1-Concert 5
- Roy Concert 1-Concert 11
- Matias Concert 1-Concert 4
- Ale (replacement for Matias) Concert 5-Concert 7
- Oscar (replacement for Wilfredo) Concert 6-Concert 7
- Mayrenne (replacement for Jose Antonio) Concert 7-Concert 8
- Diana Galindo (entered the competition on May 9.) Concert 8-Concert 11
- Frankie (replacement for Mayrenne) Concert 9-Concert 11
- Dulce (replacement for Ale) Concert 11

Group 11: Neon Green...Eliminated

- Napoleon Concert 1-Concert 4
- Cesar Concert 1-Concert 4
- Ana Lucia Concert 1-Concert 4
- Cintia Concert 1-Concert 4
- Carlos (replacement for Napoleon) Concert 4

Group 12: Fuchsia...Eliminated

- Mariana Concert 1
- Patricia Concert 1
- Melissa Concert 1
- Marco Concert 1
- Julia Concert 1

Group 13: Sky Blue...Eliminated

- Edgar Concert 1-Concert 4 and Concert 6
- Hector Concert 1-Concert 6
- Jose Luis Concert 1-Concert 6
- Rodrigo Concert 1-Concert 6
- Yadhira (replacement for Edgar) Concert 5

Group 14

- Israel Concert 8-Concert 11
- Melissa Concert 8-Concert 11
- Alejandra Concert 8-Concert 11
- Napoleon Concert 10-Concert 11

==== Team Progression ====
===== Individual =====
Only primary teams displayed. Contestants ordered by placement and order in which they joined their final team.

Segunda oportunidad Teams
Contestant	Concert										
Contestant	1	2	3	4	5	6	7	8	9	10	11
Menny	4	4	4	4	4	4	6	6	6	2	4
Agustín	3	3	3	4	4	4	4	4	4	4	4
Óscar	5	5	5	5	10	10	10	4	4	4	4
Sebastián	6	6	6	6	6	6	6	6	4	4	4
Laura	2	2	2	2	2	2	2	2	2	2	2
Adrián	7	7	7	7	7	7	2	2	2	2	2
César	11	11	11	11	6	6	6	2	2	2	2
Matías	10	10	10	4	4	4	4	4	4	4	2
Alejandra	4	4	4	10	10	10	10 (Note: This member did not sing with their team because of their behavior.)	14	14	14	14
Israel	8	8	8	8	6	6	4	14	14	14	14
Melissa	12	6	6	6	8	8	8	14	14	14	14
Napoleón	11	11	11	2	2	2	2	2	2	14	14
Daniel	5	5	5	5	5	5	5	~~5~~ (Note: This contestant was individually eliminated from their team at the beginning of the concert.)	5	5	5
Mike	5	5	5	5	5	5	5	5	5	5	5
Édgar	13	13	13	7	13	5	5	5	5	5	5
Roy	10	10	10	10	10	10	10	10	~~10~~	10	10
Frankie	8	8	8	8	8	7	7	10	10	10	10
Diana G.								10	10	10	10
Dulce L.	1	1	1	1	4	4	4	8	8	8	10
Mario	8	8	8	8	8	8	8	4	6	8	
Hiromi	9	9	7	7	7	8	8	8	8	8	
Alba	5	5	5	5	5	5	5	5	5	~~5~~	
Wendolee	4	4	4	4	1	2	2	6	6		
Manuel	1	1	1	6	6	6	6	6	6		
Diana S.	8	8	8	8	8	8	8	8	~~8~~		
Rodrigo	13	13	13	13	13	13	7	7			
José Antonio	10	10	10	10	10	2	7	7			
Mayrenne	2	2	2	2	2	10	10	7			
Yadhira	7	7	7	13	7	7	7				
Héctor S.	13	13	13	13	13	13					
José Luis	13	13	13	13	13	13					
Wilfredo	10	10	10	10	5	13					
Nohelia	7	7	7	7	7	7					
Abyadé	1	1	1	1	1						
Karla	1	1	1	1	1						
Perla	6	6	6	1	1						
Ana Lucía	11	11	11	11							
Cintia	11	11	11	11							
Carlos	2	2	2	11							
Esteban	3	3	3								
Héctor Z.	3	3	3								
Andrea	4	4	4								
Iván	6	6	6								
Luz	3	3	~~3~~								
Anahí	2	2	~~2~~								
Gerardo	9	9									
Jaccyve	9	9									
Marco Antonio	12	9									
Gisela	7	7									
Mariana	12										
Paty	12										
Julia	6										
Diego	9										

===== Team =====
Segunda oportunidad Teams
Team	Concert										
Team	1	2	3	4	5	6	7	8	9	10	11
4	Alejandra			Matías							Menny
4	Andrea			Agustín							
4	Menny						Israel	Óscar			
4	Wendolee				Dulce			Mario	Sebastián		
2	Anahí		—N/a			Wendolee		César			
2	Carlos			Napoleón					Napoleón	Menny	Matías
2	Laura										
2	Mayrenne					José Antonio	Adrián				
14								Alejandra			
14								Israel			
14								Melissa			
14										Napoleón	
5	Alba									—N/a	
5	Daniel							—N/a	Daniel		
5	Mike										
5	Óscar				Wilfredo	Édgar					
10	José Antonio					Mayrenne		Frankie			
10	Matías			Alejandra			Alejandra	—N/a			Dulce
10	Roy								—N/a	Roy	
10	Wilfredo				Óscar			Diana G.			
8	Diana S.									—N/a	
8	Frankie					Hiromi					Hiromi
8	Israel				Melissa		Melissa	—N/a		Mario	Mario
8	Mario							Dulce			
6	Iván			—N/a	César			Wendolee		Wendolee	
6	Julia	Melissa				Israel		Menny			
6	Perla			Manuel					Manuel		
6	Sebastián								Mario		
7	Adrián						José Antonio		José Antonio		
7	Gisela		Hiromi			Frankie		Mayrenne	Mayrenne		
7	Nohelia						Rodrigo		Rodrigo		
7	Yadhira			Édgar	Yadhira			—N/a			
13	Édgar			Yadhira	Édgar	Wilfredo	Wilfredo				
13	Héctor S.						Héctor S.				
13	José Luis						José Luis				
13	Rodrigo						Nohelia				
1	Abyadé					Abyadé					
1	Dulce L.				Wendolee						
1	Karla					Karla					
1	Manuel			Perla		Perla					
11	Ana Lucía				Ana Lucía						
11	César										
11	Cintia				Cintia						
11	Napoleón			Carlos	Carlos						
3	Agustín			Andrea							
3	Esteban			Esteban							
3	Héctor Z.			Héctor Z.							
3	Luz		—N/a								
9	Diego	Marco	Marco								
9	Gerardo		Gerardo								
9	Hiromi										
9	Jaccyve		Jaccyve								
12	Marco										
12	Mariana	Mariana									
12	Melissa	Julia									
12	Paty	Paty									

== Song list ==
Contestant	Concert										
Contestant	1	2	3	4	5	6	7	8	9	10	11
Agustín	Homage to Buki	A quien tú decidiste amar Y todo para qué	Maldita luna Te vi venir	Mientes	La fuerza del corazón	Suelta mi mano El sol no regresa	Lloraré las penas Me nace del corazón	Estuve	Yo no sé mañana	Yo soy aquel Volveré Provócame	Qué nivel de mujer Regresa a mí No soy el aire No sé olvidar Aquí estoy yo
Menny	Ni rosas ni juguetes Todo es posible	Cásate conmigo	Todo cambió	Mientes	La fuerza del corazón	Suelta mi mano El sol no regresa	Lloraré las penas	Pedro Navajas Mujeres divinas	Amor amor Quién piensa en ti Al final	Puedes llegar Dígale Provócame	Qué nivel de mujer Regresa a mí No soy el aire No sé olvidar Aquí estoy yo
Óscar	Adoro	Por tu amor Y todo para qué	El final	La negra Tomasa	Nunca voy a olvidarte	Fuerte no soy Cinco minutos Matador	Otra vez Caray Brindis de soledad	Estuve	Yo no sé mañana	Yo soy aquel Volveré Provocame	Qué nivel de mujer Regresa a mí No soy el aire No sé olvidar Aquí estoy yo
Sebastián	Colgando en tus manos Todo es posible	Se me va la voz	Guapa	Un montón de estrellas	La cima del cielo El aventurero Mientes tan bien	Tú de qué vas Por amarte así	Bulería	Pedro Navajas Mujeres divinas	Amor, amor	Yo soy aquel Volveré Provocame	Qué nivel de mujer Regresa a mí No soy el aire No sé olvidar Aquí estoy yo
Adrián	Para amarnos más	La puerta de Alcalá Y todo para qué	Inolvidable	Irremediable	A labio dulce Estos celos	A quién le importa Ahora te puedes marchar	Coleccionista de canciones	Vivir así es morir de amor	Se me olvidó otra vez	Puedes llegar Dígale Sueños La bomba	Pégate Sola otra vez Procuro olvidarte Cucurucucú paloma Ves
César	Es por ti	Rumores	Lluvia	Mujeres Aquí estoy yo	La cima del cielo El aventurero Mientes tan bien	Tú de qué vas Por amarte así	Bulería	Pedro Navajas	Se me olvidó otra vez	Puedes llegar Dígale Sueños La bomba	Pégate Sola otra vez Procuro olvidarte Cucurucucú paloma Ves
Laura	Homage to Dulce	El triste Y todo para qué	Tú y yo somos uno mismo Oye	Mudanzas	Sin miedo a nada Te quedó grande la yegua	Quién eres tú	Hoy ya me voy	Vivir así es morir de amor	Se me olvidó otra vez	Puedes llegar Dígale Sueños La bomba	Pégate Sola otra vez Procuro olvidarte Cucurucucú paloma Ves
Matías	Esclavos de tus besos	Sentirme vivo	Lo dejaría todo	Si la ves	La fuerza del corazón	Suelta mi mano El sol no regresa	Lloraré las penas Me nace del corazón	Estuve	Yo no sé mañana	Yo soy aquel Volveré Sueños La bomba	Pégate Sola otra vez Procuro olvidarte Cucurucucú paloma Ves
Alejandra	Ni rosas ni juguetes	Cásate conmigo	Todo cambió	Mientes	La bilirrubina	Mala hierba Cinco minutos Matador	Perdóname	Me va a extrañar	Nena Viviendo de noche	No te pido flores El aprendiz	«Fame» Vivo por ella Me muero
Israel	La tortura	Estuve a punto de	Mi bombón Color esperanza	Mis ojos lloran por ti	Me cuesta tanto olvidarte El aventurero Mientes tan bien	Tú de que vas Por amarte así	Perdóname	Me va a extrañar	Nena Viviendo de noche	No te pido flores El aprendiz	«Fame» Vivo por ella Me muero
Melissa	Homage to Juan Gabriel Todo es posible	Se me va la voz	Guapa	Un montón de estrellas	La cima del cielo	Espacio sideral	Perdóname	Me va a extrañar	Nena Viviendo de noche	No te pido flores El aprendiz	«Fame» Vivo por ella Me muero
Napoleón	Es por ti	Rumores	Lluvia	Mujeres	Sin miedo a nada La media vuelta	Eres	Hoy ya me voy	Vivir así es morir de amor	Se me olvidó otra vez México	No te pido flores El aprendiz	«Fame» Vivo por ella Me muero
Daniel	Adoro	Por tu amor	El final El sinaloense	La negra Tomasa	Nunca voy a olvidarte Sin tantita pena	Pero te vas a arrepentir	Cómo te voy a olvidar	Muriendo lento	Que no quede huella La ladrona	La vida es un carnaval Te he prometido La María	Las mulas de moreno Ya lo pasado pasado
Édgar	El amor Todo es posible	Livin' la vida loca	Aire	Mi vida eres tú	A labio dulce	Valió la pena Ámame hasta con los dientes Las piedras rodantes	Cómo te voy a olvidar	Muriendo lento Ella	Que no quede huella La ladrona	La vida es un carnaval Te he prometido La María	Las mulas de moreno Ya lo pasado pasado
Mike	Adoro	Por tu amor	El final	La negra Tomasa	Nunca voy a olvidarte Sin tantita pena	Pero te vas a arrepentir	Cómo te voy a olvidar	Muriendo lento Ella	Que no quede huella La ladrona	La vida es un carnaval Te he prometido La María	Las mulas de moreno Ya lo pasado pasado
Diana G.						Mírame	¿Es ella más que yo?	Callados	¿Ahora quién? A esa Al final	Como yo nadie te ha amado A Dios le pido	Que te quería
Dulce L.	Olvídame y pega la vuelta	Amor de tres	Te amo	En los puritos huesos	Sin él	Suelta mi mano El sol no regresa	Lloraré las penas Me nace del corazón	Estuve La diferencia	Inevitable Yo no te pido la luna Al final	Jamás Y llegaste tú A Dios le pido	Que te quería
Frankie	La tortura	Estuve a punto de	Mi bombón	Mis ojos lloran por ti	Me cuesta tanto olvidarte	Espacio sideral Ahora te puedes marchar	Coleccionista de canciones Me gustas mucho Brindis de soledad	Corazón espinado	¿Ahora quién? A esa Al final	Como yo nadie te ha amado A Dios le pido	Que te quería
Roy	Esclavos de tus besos	Sentirme vivo Y todo para qué	Lo dejaría todo	Si la ves	La bilirrubina	Fuerte no soy Cinco minutos Matador	Otra vez Caray Brindis de soledad	Callados	¿Ahora quién? A esa	Como yo nadie te ha amado A Dios le pido	Que te quería
Hiromi	Como la flor	Celos	Inolvidable	Irremediable	A labio dulce Estos celos	A quién le importa	Solo por un beso Me gusta estar contigo	Hoy no me puedo levantar La diferencia	Inevitable Yo no te pido la luna Al final	Jamás Y llegaste tú Sueños	
Mario	La tortura	Estuve a punto de	Mi bombón	Mis ojos lloran por ti	Me cuesta tanto olvidarte	Espacio sideral	Solo por un beso Me gusta estar contigo	Hoy no me puedo levantar	Yo no sé mañana Quién piensa en ti Al final	Jamás Y llegaste tú Sueños	
Alba	Adoro	Por tu amor	El final	La negra Tomasa	Nunca voy a olvidarte Sin tantita pena	Pero te vas a arrepentir	Cómo te voy a olvidar	Muriendo lento Ella	Que no quede huella La ladrona	La vida es un carnaval Te he prometido	
Wendolee	Ni rosas ni juguetes	Cásate conmigo	Todo cambió	Mientes	La fuerza del corazón El último adiós No te pido flores	Yo sin tu amor	Hoy ya me voy	Vivir así es morir de amor Mujeres divinas	Amor, amor Quién piensa en ti Al final		
Manuel	Olvídame y pega la vuelta	Amor de tres	Te amo	En los puritos huesos	La cima del cielo El aventurero Mientes tan bien	Tú de qué vas Por amarte así	Bulería	Pedro Navajas Mujeres divinas	Amor, amor A mi manera		
Diana S.	La tortura	Estuve a punto de	Mi bombón	Mis ojos lloran por ti	Me cuesta tanto olvidarte	Espacio sideral	Solo por un beso Me gusta estar contigo	Hoy no me puedo levantar La diferencia	Inevitable		
José Antonio	Esclavos de tus besos	Sentirme vivo	Lo dejaría todo Como quien pierde una estrella	Si la ves	La bilirrubina	Soy un desastre	Hoy ya me voy Me gustas mucho Brindis de soledad	Corazón espinado Y			
Mayrenne	Homage to Dulce	El triste	Tú y yo somos uno mismo	Mudanzas	Sin miedo a nada Te quedó grande la yegua	El hombre de mi vida Cinco minutos Matador	Otra vez Caray Brindis de soledad	Callados Y			
Rodrigo	El amor	Livin' la vida loca	Aire	Mi vida eres tú Me estoy enamorando	Mi gran noche	Valió la pena Ámame hasta con los dientes Las piedras rodantes	Coleccionista de canciones Me gustas mucho Brindis de soledad	Corazón espinado Y			
Yadhira	Para amarnos más	La puerta de Alcalá	Inolvidable	Irremediable Me estoy enamorando	Mi gran noche Estos celos	A quién le importa Ahora te puedes marchar	Coleccionista de canciones Me gustas mucho Brindis de soledad				
Héctor S.	El amor	Livin' la vida loca	Aire	Mi vida eres tú Me estoy enamorando	Mi gran noche	Valió la pena Ámame hasta con los dientes Las piedras rodantes					
José Luis	El amor	Livin' la vida loca	Aire	Mi vida eres tú Me estoy enamorando	Mi gran noche	Valió la pena Ámame hasta con los dientes Las piedras rodantes					
Nohelia	Para amarnos más	La puerta de Alcalá	Inolvidable	Irremediable	A labio dulce Estos celos	A quién le importa Ahora te puedes marchar					
Wilfredo	Esclavos de tus besos	Sentirme vivo	Lo dejaría todo	Si la ves	La bilirrubina Sin tantita pena	Pero te vas a arrepentir Ámame hasta con los dientes Las piedras rodantes					
Abyadé	Olvídame y pega la vuelta	Amor de tres	Te amo Color esperanza	En los puritos huesos	Sin él El último adiós No te pido flores						
Karla	Olvídame y pega la vuelta	Amor de tres	Te amo	En los puritos huesos	Sin él El último adiós No te pido flores						
Perla	Colgando en tus manos	Se me va la voz	Guapa	Un montón de estrellas	Sin él El último adiós No te pido flores						
Ana Lucía	Es por ti	Rumores	Lluvia	Mujeres Aquí estoy yo							
Carlos	Homage to Dulce	El triste	Tú y yo somos uno mismo	Mudanzas Aquí estoy yo							
Cintia	Es por ti	Rumores	Lluvia	Mujeres Aquí estoy yo							
Andrea	Ni rosas ni juguetes	Cásate conmigo	Todo cambió								
Esteban	Homage to Buki	A quien tú decidiste amar	Maldita luna								
Héctor Z.	Homage to Buki	A quien tú decidiste amar	Maldita luna Color esperanza								
Iván	Colgando en tus manos	Se me va la voz	Guapa Color esperanza								
Anahí	Homage to Dulce	El triste	~~Tú y yo somos uno mismo~~								
Luz	Homage to Buki	A quien tú decidiste amar	~~Maldita luna~~								
Gerardo	Como la flor	Celos									
Jaccyve	Como la flor	Celos Y todo para qué									
Marco	Homage to Juan Gabriel	Celos									
Gisela	Para amarnos más	La puerta de Alcalá									
Julia	Colgando en tus manos										
Mariana	Homage to Juan Gabriel										
Patricia	Homage to Juan Gabriel										
Diego	Como la flor Todo es posible										

== Elimination Table ==
Contestant	Starting Team	Concert											Final Team
Contestant	Starting Team	1	2–3	3	4	5	6	7	8	9	10	11	Final Team
Agustín	3	SAFE	LOW	SAVED	SAFE	SAFE	SAFE	SAFE	SAFE	SAFE	SAFE	WINNER	4
Menny	4	SAFE	SAFE	WIN	SAFE	SAFE	SAFE	SAFE	SAFE	SAVED	SAFE	WINNER	4
Óscar	5	SAFE	LOW	SAFE	SAFE	SAFE	LOW	SAVED	SAFE	SAFE	SAFE	WINNER	4
Sebastián	6	WIN	SAFE	SAFE	WIN	LOW	SAFE	SAFE	SAFE	SAFE	SAFE	WINNER	4
Adrián	7	LOW	SAFE	SAFE	SAFE	SAFE	WIN	SAFE	SAFE	WIN	LOW	RUNNER-UP	2
César	11	SAFE	SAFE	SAFE	SAVED	LOW	SAFE	SAFE	SAFE	WIN	LOW	RUNNER-UP	2
Laura	2	SAFE	LOW	SAFE	SAFE	WIN	SAFE	SAFE	SAFE	WIN	LOW	RUNNER-UP	2
Matías	10	SAFE	LOW	SAFE	SAFE	SAFE	SAFE	SAFE	SAFE	SAFE	LOW	RUNNER-UP	2
Alejandra	4	SAFE	SAFE	WIN	SAFE	SAFE	LOW	—N/a	SAFE	SAFE	SAFE	THIRD	14
Israel	8	SAFE	SAFE	SAFE	SAFE	LOW	SAFE	—N/a	SAFE	SAFE	SAFE	THIRD	14
Melissa	12	SAVED	SAFE	SAFE	WIN	SAFE	SAFE	—N/a	SAFE	SAFE	SAFE	THIRD	14
Napoleón	11	SAFE	SAFE	SAFE	SAFE	WIN	SAFE	SAFE	SAFE	—N/a	SAFE	THIRD	14
Daniel	5	SAFE	LOW	SAFE	SAFE	SAFE	SAFE	SAFE	SAVED	SAFE	SAFE	FOURTH	5
Édgar	13	SAFE	SAFE	SAFE	SAFE	SAFE	SAFE	SAFE	WIN	SAFE	SAFE	FOURTH	5
Mike	5	SAFE	LOW	SAFE	SAFE	SAFE	SAFE	SAFE	WIN	SAFE	SAFE	FOURTH	5
Diana G.	—N/a								SAFE	SAFE	SAFE	FIFTH	10
Dulce L.	1	SAFE	SAFE	LOW	SAFE	SAFE	SAFE	SAFE	LOW	SAFE	SAFE	FIFTH	10
Frankie	8	SAFE	SAFE	SAFE	SAFE	SAFE	WIN	LOW	SAFE	SAFE	SAFE	FIFTH	10
Roy	10	SAFE	LOW	SAFE	SAFE	SAFE	LOW	LOW	SAFE	SAVED	SAFE	FIFTH	10
Hiromi	9	SAFE	SAVED	SAFE	SAFE	SAFE	SAFE	SAFE	LOW	SAFE	OUT		8
Mario	8	SAFE	SAFE	SAFE	SAFE	SAFE	SAFE	SAFE	SAFE	SAVED	OUT		8
Alba	5	SAFE	LOW	SAFE	SAFE	SAFE	SAFE	SAFE	WIN	SAFE	ELIM.		—N/a
Wendolee	4	SAFE	SAFE	WIN	SAFE	SAVED	SAFE	SAFE	SAFE	OUT			6
Manuel	1	SAFE	SAFE	LOW	WIN	LOW	SAFE	SAFE	SAFE	DQ			—N/a
Diana S.	8	SAFE	SAFE	SAFE	SAFE	SAFE	SAFE	SAFE	LOW	ELIM.			—N/a
José Antonio	10	SAFE	LOW	SAFE	SAFE	SAFE	SAFE	LOW	OUT				7
Rodrigo	13	SAFE	SAFE	SAFE	LOW	SAFE	SAVED	LOW	OUT				7
Mayrenne	2	SAFE	LOW	SAFE	SAFE	WIN	LOW	LOW	OUT				7
Yadhira	7	LOW	SAFE	SAFE	LOW	SAFE	WIN	ELIM.					—N/a
Héctor S.	13	SAFE	SAFE	SAFE	LOW	SAFE	OUT						13
José Luis	13	SAFE	SAFE	SAFE	LOW	SAFE	OUT						13
Nohelia	7	LOW	SAFE	SAFE	SAFE	SAFE	OUT						13
Wilfredo	10	SAFE	LOW	SAFE	SAFE	SAFE	OUT						13
Abyadé	1	SAFE	SAFE	LOW	SAFE	OUT							1
Karla	1	SAFE	SAFE	LOW	SAFE	OUT							1
Perla	6	WIN	SAFE	SAFE	SAFE	OUT							1
Ana Lucía	11	SAFE	SAFE	SAFE	OUT								11
Carlos	2	SAFE	LOW	SAFE	OUT								11
Cintia	11	SAFE	SAFE	SAFE	OUT								11
Andrea	4	SAFE	SAFE	OUT									3
Esteban	3	SAFE	LOW	OUT									3
Héctor Z.	3	SAFE	LOW	OUT									3
Iván	6	WIN	SAFE	ELIM.									—N/a
Luz	3	SAFE	ELIM.										—N/a
Anahí	2	SAFE	ELIM.										—N/a
Gerardo	9	SAFE	OUT										9
Jaccyve	9	SAFE	OUT										9
Marco	12	SAVED	OUT										9
Gisela	7	LOW	DQ										—N/a
Julia	6	OUT											12
Mariana	12	OUT											12
Patricia	12	OUT											12
Diego	9	ELIM.											—N/a
