= List of awards and nominations received by Meryl Streep =

Meryl Streep awards and nominations
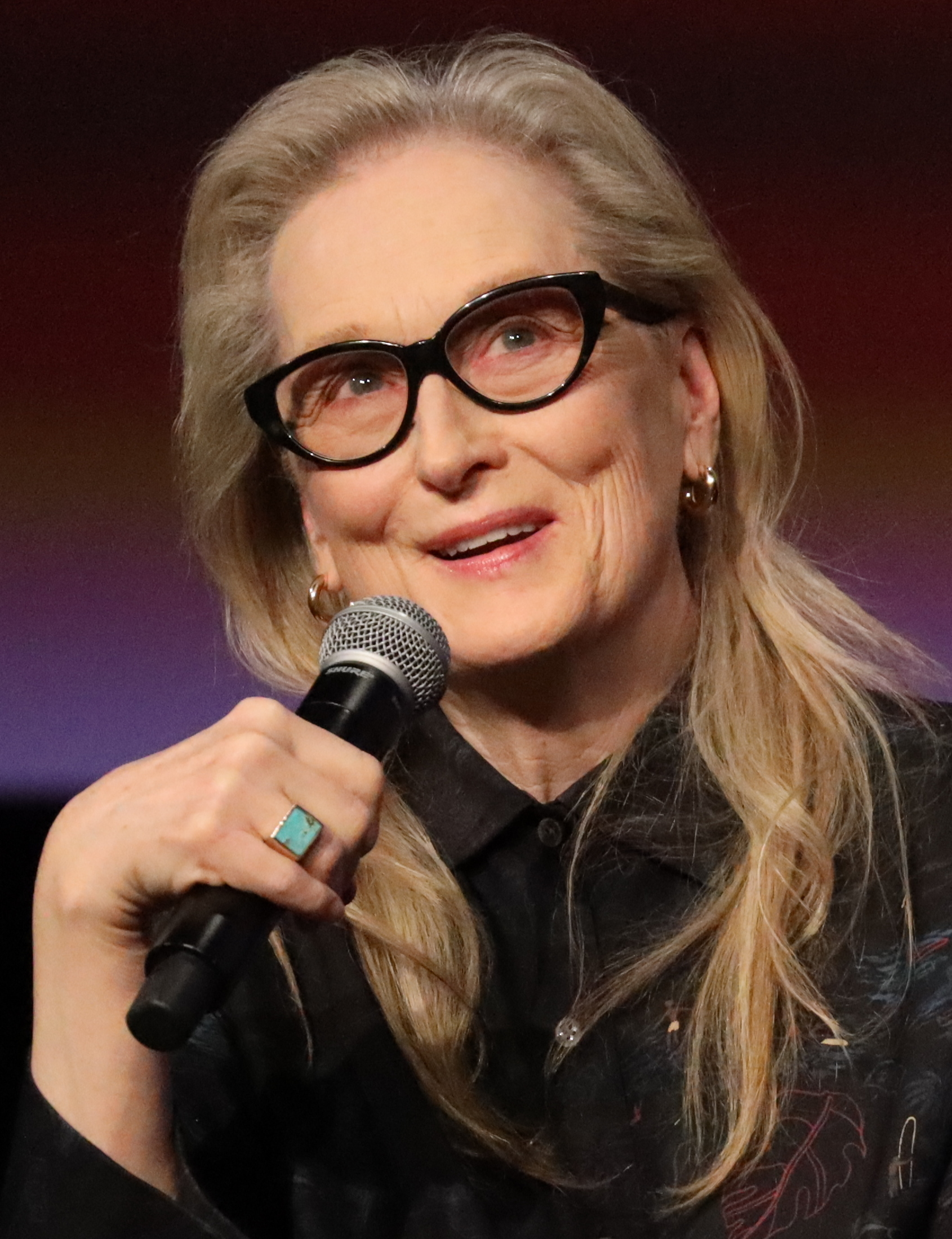
- Streep at the 2024 Cannes Film Festival
Awards and nominations
Award	Wins	Nominations
Academy Awards	3	21
Actor Awards	2	20
BAFTA Awards	2	15
Critics' Choice Awards	4	10
Emmy Awards	4	7
Golden Globes	9	34
Grammy Awards	0	7
Tony Awards	0	1

Totals (Note: Certain award groups do not simply award one winner. They acknowledge several different recipients, have runners-up, and have third place. Since this is a specific recognition and is different from losing an award, runner-up mentions are considered wins in this award tally. For simplification and to avoid errors, each award in this list has been presumed to have had a prior nomination.)
- Wins: 205
- Nominations: 408

Meryl Streep is an American actress who has been recognized with numerous accolades for her work on screen and stage having been one of few individuals to be nominated for both the Triple Crown of Acting and EGOT. Streep has won three Academy Awards, two BAFTA Awards, nine Golden Globe Awards, four Emmy Awards, and two Actor Awards as well as nominations for seven Grammy Awards and a Tony Award. She received numerous honorary accolades including an Honorary César in 2003, a star on the Hollywood Walk of Fame in 2004, the AFI Life Achievement Award in 2004, the Kennedy Center Honor in 2011, the Honorary Golden Bear in 2012, and the Cecil B. DeMille Award in 2017. She was presented with the National Medal of Arts in 2010 and the Presidential Medal of Freedom in 2014 from Barack Obama.

She holds the record for the most Academy Award nominations of any actor, having been nominated 21 times—17 for Best Actress, and four for Best Supporting Actress—since the first nomination in 1978 for her performance in The Deer Hunter. She has won three times for her work in Kramer vs. Kramer (1980), Sophie's Choice (1983), and The Iron Lady (2012), making her the fifth actor to win three competitive acting Academy Awards. (Note: Streep was only after Katharine Hepburn (who has four in total), Walter Brennan, Ingrid Bergman, and Jack Nicholson.) In 2009, Streep became the most-nominated performer in the Golden Globe Awards history when her Best Actress nominations for Doubt and Mamma Mia! gave her 23 in total, surpassing Jack Lemmon’s previous record of 22. Three years later, she garnered her eighth win for The Iron Lady, more than any actors. She received a record-breaking 30th nomination for Florence Foster Jenkins (2017).

With her fifteenth nomination for Florence Foster Jenkins in 2017, Streep tied with Judi Dench for the most-nominated actor at the BAFTA Awards. She has won the award for Best Actress twice for her roles in The French Lieutenant's Woman (1982) and The Iron Lady (2012). For her work in The Hours, Streep received a Silver Bear for Best Actress at the 53rd Berlin International Film Festival, who later recognized her with an Honorary Golden Bear at their 62nd ceremony. Her portrayal as Lindy Chamberlain in Evil Angels (Note: The film was released worldwide as A Cry in the Dark, except in Australia and New Zealand, where it was released under the title Evil Angels.) earned her a Cannes Film Festival Award.

In 1976, Streep won the Outer Critics Circle Award for Outstanding Performance for her stage debut in Trelawny of the 'Wells' and Tennessee Williams' 27 Wagons Full of Cotton. The latter work also earned her nominations for Best Actress at the Drama Desk and Tony Award. The following year, she was a double nominee at the Drama Desk Award for the featured role in The Cherry Orchard and starred in the musical Happy End. Streep won the Primetime Emmy Award for Outstanding Lead Actress – Miniseries or a Movie for her roles in the miniseries Holocaust (1978) and Angels in America (2003). She also won Primetime Emmy Award for Outstanding Narrator for her work on documentary Five Came Back (2017).

In 1983, Yale University, from which Streep graduated in 1975, awarded her an Honorary Degree, a Doctorate of Fine Arts. The first university to award her an Honorary Degree was Dartmouth College, where she spent time as a transfer student in 1970, in 1981. In 1998, Women in Film awarded Streep with the Crystal Award. In 1999, she was awarded a George Eastman Award, given by George Eastman House for distinguished contribution to the art of film. In 2004, at the Moscow International Film Festival, she was honored with the Stanislavsky Award for the outstanding achievement in the career of acting and devotion to the principles of Stanislavsky's school. In 2008, Streep was inducted into the New Jersey Hall of Fame. In 2009, she was awarded an honorary Doctorate of Fine Arts by Princeton University. In 2010 she elected to the American Academy of Arts and Letters, and was awarded an honorary Doctor of Arts degree by Harvard University.

Key
†	Indicates non-competitive categories

== Major awards ==
=== Academy Awards ===
Year	Category	Work	Result	Received by	Ref.
1979	Best Supporting Actress	The Deer Hunter	Nominated	Maggie Smith (California Suite)	
1980	Best Supporting Actress	Kramer vs. Kramer	Won	—	
1982	Best Actress	The French Lieutenant's Woman	Nominated	Katharine Hepburn (On Golden Pond)	
1983	Best Actress	Sophie's Choice	Won	—	
1984	Best Actress	Silkwood	Nominated	Shirley MacLaine (Terms of Endearment)	
1986	Best Actress	Out of Africa	Nominated	Geraldine Page (The Trip to Bountiful)	
1988	Best Actress	Ironweed	Nominated	Cher (Moonstruck)	
1989	Best Actress	A Cry in the Dark	Nominated	Jodie Foster (The Accused)	
1991	Best Actress	Postcards from the Edge	Nominated	Kathy Bates (Misery)	
1996	Best Actress	The Bridges of Madison County	Nominated	Susan Sarandon (Dead Man Walking)	
1999	Best Actress	One True Thing	Nominated	Gwyneth Paltrow (Shakespeare in Love)	
2000	Best Actress	Music of the Heart	Nominated	Hilary Swank (Boys Don't Cry)	
2003	Best Supporting Actress	Adaptation	Nominated	Catherine Zeta-Jones (Chicago)	
2007	Best Actress	The Devil Wears Prada	Nominated	Helen Mirren (The Queen)	
2009	Best Actress	Doubt	Nominated	Kate Winslet (The Reader)	
2010	Best Actress	Julie & Julia	Nominated	Sandra Bullock (The Blind Side)	
2012	Best Actress	The Iron Lady	Won	—	
2014	Best Actress	August: Osage County	Nominated	Cate Blanchett (Blue Jasmine)	
2015	Best Supporting Actress	Into the Woods	Nominated	Patricia Arquette (Boyhood)	
2017	Best Actress	Florence Foster Jenkins	Nominated	Emma Stone (La La Land)	
2018	Best Actress	The Post	Nominated	Frances McDormand (Three Billboards Outside Ebbing, Missouri)	

=== Actor Awards ===
Year	Category	Work	Result	Ref.
1995	Outstanding Female Actor in a Leading Role	The River Wild	Nominated	
1996	Outstanding Female Actor in a Leading Role	The Bridges of Madison County	Nominated	
1997	Outstanding Cast in a Motion Picture	Marvin's Room	Nominated	
1999	Outstanding Female Actor in a Leading Role	One True Thing	Nominated	
2000	Outstanding Female Actor in a Leading Role	Music of the Heart	Nominated	
2003	Outstanding Cast in a Motion Picture	Adaptation	Nominated	
2003	Outstanding Cast in a Motion Picture	The Hours	Nominated	
2004	Outstanding Female Actor in a Miniseries or Television Movie	Angels in America	Won	
2007	Outstanding Female Actor in a Leading Role	The Devil Wears Prada	Nominated	
2009	Outstanding Female Actor in a Leading Role	Doubt	Won	
2009	Outstanding Cast in a Motion Picture	Doubt	Nominated	
2010	Outstanding Female Actor in a Leading Role	Julie & Julia	Nominated	
2012	Outstanding Female Actor in a Leading Role	The Iron Lady	Nominated	
2014	Outstanding Female Actor in a Leading Role	August: Osage County	Nominated	
2014	Outstanding Cast in a Motion Picture	August: Osage County	Nominated	
2015	Outstanding Female Actor in a Supporting Role	Into the Woods	Nominated	
2017	Outstanding Female Actor in a Leading Role	Florence Foster Jenkins	Nominated	
2020	Outstanding Ensemble in a Drama Series	Big Little Lies	Nominated	
2022	Outstanding Cast in a Motion Picture	Don't Look Up	Nominated	
2024	Outstanding Ensemble in a Comedy Series	Only Murders in the Building	Nominated	

=== BAFTA Awards ===
British Academy Film Awards
Year	Category	Work	Result	Ref.
1980	Best Actress in a Supporting Role	Manhattan	Nominated	
1980	Best Actress in a Leading Role	The Deer Hunter	Nominated	
1981	Best Actress in a Leading Role	Kramer vs. Kramer	Nominated	
1982	Best Actress in a Leading Role	The French Lieutenant's Woman	Won	
1984	Best Actress in a Leading Role	Sophie's Choice	Nominated	
1985	Best Actress in a Leading Role	Silkwood	Nominated	
1987	Best Actress in a Leading Role	Out of Africa	Nominated	
2003	Best Actress in a Leading Role	The Hours	Nominated	
2003	Best Actress in a Supporting Role	Adaptation	Nominated	
2005	Best Actress in a Supporting Role	The Manchurian Candidate	Nominated	
2007	Best Actress in a Leading Role	The Devil Wears Prada	Nominated	
2009	Best Actress in a Leading Role	Doubt	Nominated	
2010	Best Actress in a Leading Role	Julie & Julia	Nominated	
2012	Best Actress in a Leading Role	The Iron Lady	Won	
2017	Best Actress in a Leading Role	Florence Foster Jenkins	Nominated	

=== Critics' Choice Awards ===
Year	Category	Work	Result	Ref.
Film
2003	Best Supporting Actress	Adaptation	Nominated	
2007	Best Actress	The Devil Wears Prada	Nominated	
2009	Best Actress	Doubt	Won (Note: Tied with Anne Hathaway for Rachel Getting Married.)	
2010	Best Actress	Julie & Julia	Won (Note: Tied with Sandra Bullock for The Blind Side.)	
2012	Best Actress	The Iron Lady	Nominated	
2014	Best Actress	August: Osage County	Nominated	
2015	Best Supporting Actress	Into The Woods	Nominated	
2017	Best Comedy Actress	Florence Foster Jenkins	Won	
2018	Best Actress	The Post	Nominated	
Television
2024	Best Supporting Actress in a Comedy Series	Only Murders in the Building	Won	

=== Emmy Awards ===
Primetime Emmy Awards
Year	Category	Work	Result	Ref.
1978	Outstanding Lead Actress in a Limited Series or Movie	Holocaust	Won	
1997	Outstanding Lead Actress in a Limited Series or Movie	...First Do No Harm	Nominated	
2003	Outstanding Lead Actress in a Limited Series or Movie	Angels in America	Won	
2017	Outstanding Narrator	Five Came Back (episode: "The Price of Victory")	Won	
2020	Outstanding Supporting Actress in a Drama Series	Big Little Lies (episode: "I Want to Know")	Nominated	
2024	Outstanding Supporting Actress in a Comedy Series	Only Murders in the Building (episode: "Grab Your Hankies")	Nominated	
Children's and Family Emmy Awards
2025	Outstanding Children's Personality	Storyline Online: The Three Questions	Won	

=== Golden Globe Awards ===
Year	Category	Work	Result	Ref.
1979	Best Supporting Actress – Motion Picture	The Deer Hunter	Nominated	
1980	Best Supporting Actress – Motion Picture	Kramer vs. Kramer	Won	
1982	Best Actress in a Motion Picture – Drama	The French Lieutenant's Woman	Won	
1983	Best Actress in a Motion Picture – Drama	Sophie's Choice	Won	
1984	Best Actress in a Motion Picture – Drama	Silkwood	Nominated	
1986	Best Actress in a Motion Picture – Drama	Out of Africa	Nominated	
1989	Best Actress in a Motion Picture – Drama	A Cry in the Dark	Nominated	
1990	Best Actress in a Motion Picture – Musical or Comedy	She-Devil	Nominated	
1991	Best Actress in a Motion Picture – Musical or Comedy	Postcards from the Edge	Nominated	
1993	Best Actress in a Motion Picture – Musical or Comedy	Death Becomes Her	Nominated	
1995	Best Actress in a Motion Picture – Drama	The River Wild	Nominated	
1996	Best Actress in a Motion Picture – Drama	The Bridges of Madison County	Nominated	
1997	Best Actress in a Motion Picture – Drama	Marvin's Room	Nominated	
1998	Best Actress - Miniseries or Television Film	...First Do No Harm	Nominated	
1999	Best Actress in a Motion Picture – Drama	One True Thing	Nominated	
2000	Best Actress in a Motion Picture – Drama	Music of the Heart	Nominated	
2003	Best Actress in a Motion Picture – Drama	The Hours	Nominated	
2003	Best Supporting Actress – Motion Picture	Adaptation	Won	
2004	Best Actress - Miniseries or Television Film	Angels in America	Won	
2005	Best Supporting Actress – Motion Picture	The Manchurian Candidate	Nominated	
2007	Best Actress in a Motion Picture – Musical or Comedy	The Devil Wears Prada	Won	
2009	Best Actress in a Motion Picture – Drama	Doubt	Nominated	
2009	Best Actress in a Motion Picture – Musical or Comedy	Mamma Mia!	Nominated	
2010	Best Actress in a Motion Picture – Musical or Comedy	It's Complicated	Nominated	
2010	Best Actress in a Motion Picture – Musical or Comedy	Julie & Julia	Won	
2012	Best Actress in a Motion Picture – Drama	The Iron Lady	Won	
2013	Best Actress in a Motion Picture – Musical or Comedy	Hope Springs	Nominated	
2014	Best Actress in a Motion Picture – Musical or Comedy	August: Osage County	Nominated	
2015	Best Supporting Actress – Motion Picture	Into the Woods	Nominated	
2017	Best Actress in a Motion Picture – Musical or Comedy	Florence Foster Jenkins	Nominated	
2017	Cecil B. DeMille Award †		Won	
2018	Best Actress in a Motion Picture – Drama	The Post	Nominated	
2020	Best Supporting Actress – Series, Miniseries or TV Movie	Big Little Lies	Nominated	
2024	Best Supporting Actress – Series, Miniseries or TV Movie	Only Murders in the Building	Nominated	

=== Grammy Awards ===
Year	Category	Work	Result	Ref.
1987	Best Album for Children	The Velveteen Rabbit	Nominated	
1990	Best Album for Children	The Tailor of Gloucester	Nominated	
1990	Best Album for Children	The Tale of Peter Rabbit	Nominated	
2007	Best Spoken Word Album for Children	The One and Only Shrek! (Note: Shared with Stanley Tucci for their work on the same audiobook.)	Nominated	
2008	Best Compilation Soundtrack for Visual Media	Mamma Mia!	Nominated	
2020	Best Spoken Word Album	Charlotte's Web (E. B. White)	Nominated	
2024	Best Spoken Word Album	Big Tree	Nominated	

=== Tony Awards ===
Year	Category	Work	Result	Ref.
1976	Best Featured Actress in a Play	27 Wagons Full of Cotton	Nominated	

== Miscellaneous awards ==
Organizations	Year (Note: Indicates the year of the ceremony.)	Category	Work	Result	Ref.
AACTA Awards	1989	Best Actress in a Leading Role	Evil Angels	Won	
AACTA International Awards	2012	Best Actress	The Iron Lady	Won	
AACTA International Awards	2014	Best Actress	August: Osage County	Nominated	
AACTA International Awards	2015	Best Supporting Actress	Into the Woods	Nominated	
AARP Movies for Grownups Awards	2003	Best Actress	Adaptation	Won	
AARP Movies for Grownups Awards	2005	Best Actress	The Manchurian Candidate	Runner-up	
AARP Movies for Grownups Awards	2005	Breakaway Performance	Stuck on You	Runner-up	
AARP Movies for Grownups Awards	2007	Best Actress	The Devil Wears Prada	Runner-up	
AARP Movies for Grownups Awards	2008	Best Actress	Lions for Lambs	Runner-up	
AARP Movies for Grownups Awards	2009	Best Actress	Doubt	Won	
AARP Movies for Grownups Awards	2009	Best Grown-Up Love Story	Meryl Streep and Pierce Brosnan for Mamma Mia!	Runner-up	
AARP Movies for Grownups Awards	2010	Best Grown-Up Love Story	Meryl Streep and Stanley Tucci for Julie & Julia	Won	
AARP Movies for Grownups Awards	2010	Best Grown-Up Love Story	Meryl Streep, Alec Baldwin, and Steve Martin for It's Complicated	Runner-up	
AARP Movies for Grownups Awards	2010	Best Actress	Julie & Julia	Runner-up	
AARP Movies for Grownups Awards	2010	Best Actress	It's Complicated	Runner-up	
AARP Movies for Grownups Awards	2012	Best Actress	The Iron Lady	Runner-up	
AARP Movies for Grownups Awards	2012	Best Grown-Up Love Story	Meryl Streep and Jim Broadbent for The Iron Lady	Won	
AARP Movies for Grownups Awards	2013	Best Grown-Up Love Story	Meryl Streep and Tommy Lee Jones for Hope Springs	Runner-up	
AARP Movies for Grownups Awards	2013	Best Actress	Hope Springs	Runner-up	
AARP Movies for Grownups Awards	2014	Best Actress	August: Osage County	Runner-up	
AARP Movies for Grownups Awards	2017	Best Actress	Florence Foster Jenkins	Runner-up	
AARP Movies for Grownups Awards	2017	Best Grown-Up Love Story	Meryl Streep and Hugh Grant for Florence Foster Jenkins	Runner-up	
AARP Movies for Grownups Awards	2018	Best Actress	The Post	Runner-up	
Aftonbladet TV Prize	1986	Female Foreign TV Personality of the Year	Meryl Streep	Won	
Alliance of Women Film Journalists	2006	Best Actress in a Comedic Performance	The Devil Wears Prada	Won	
Alliance of Women Film Journalists	2007	Actress Defying Age and Ageism	Meryl Streep	Nominated	
Alliance of Women Film Journalists	2008	Best Actress	Doubt	Nominated	
Alliance of Women Film Journalists	2008	Actress Defying Age and Ageism	Mamma Mia!	Nominated	
Alliance of Women Film Journalists	2008	Lifetime Achievement Award	Meryl Streep	Nominated	
Alliance of Women Film Journalists	2008	Women's Image Award	Meryl Streep	Nominated	
Alliance of Women Film Journalists	2009	Best Animated Female	Fantastic Mr. Fox	Nominated	
Alliance of Women Film Journalists	2009	Best Depiction of Nudity, Sexuality, or Seduction	Meryl Streep and Alec Baldwin for It's Complicated	Won (Note: Tied with Carey Mulligan and Peter Sarsgaard for An Education.)	
Alliance of Women Film Journalists	2009	Actress Defying Age and Ageism	It's Complicated Julie & Julia	Won	
Alliance of Women Film Journalists	2009	Outstanding Achievement by a Woman in the Film Industry	It's Complicated Julie & Julia	Nominated	
Alliance of Women Film Journalists	2009	Best Actress	Julie & Julia	Nominated	
Alliance of Women Film Journalists	2009	Lifetime Achievement Award	Meryl Streep	Nominated	
Alliance of Women Film Journalists	2009	Women's Image Award	Meryl Streep	Nominated	
Alliance of Women Film Journalists	2012	Best Actress	The Iron Lady	Nominated	
Alliance of Women Film Journalists	2012	Female Icon Award	The Iron Lady	Nominated	
Alliance of Women Film Journalists	2012	Actress Defying Age and Ageism	The Iron Lady	Nominated	
Alliance of Women Film Journalists	2013	Actress Defying Age and Ageism	August: Osage County	Nominated	
Alliance of Women Film Journalists	2015	Actress Defying Age and Ageism	Into the Woods	Nominated	
American Academy of Arts and Letters	2010	Honorary Member †	Meryl Streep	Won	
American Comedy Awards	1991	Funniest Actress in a Motion Picture	Postcards from the Edge	Won	
American Comedy Awards	1993	Funniest Actress in a Motion Picture	Death Becomes Her	Nominated	
American Film Institute	2004	AFI Life Achievement Award †	Meryl Streep	Won	
Audie Awards	2008	Children's Title for Ages Up to Eight	The One and Only Shrek!	Nominated	
Audie Awards	2009	Audiobook Adaptation	English Majors: A Comedy Collection for the Highly Literate	Won	
Audie Awards	2020	Audiobook of the Year	Charlotte's Web	Nominated	
Audie Awards	2020	Middle Grade Title	Charlotte's Web	Won	
Austin Film Critics Association	2019	Best Ensemble	Little Women	Nominated	
Berlin International Film Festival	1999	Berlinale Camera †	Meryl Streep	Won	
Berlin International Film Festival	2003	Silver Bear for Best Actress	The Hours (Note: Tie with Nicole Kidman and Julianne Moore for their performances in the same film.)	Won	
Berlin International Film Festival	2012	Honorary Golden Bear †	Meryl Streep	Won	
Blockbuster Entertainment Awards	1996	Favorite Actress – Drama (Theatrical)	The Bridges of Madison County	Nominated	
Boston Online Film Critics Association Awards	2020	Best Ensemble	Little Women	Won	
Boston Society of Film Critics	1982	Best Actress	Sophie's Choice	Won	
Boston Society of Film Critics	2006	Best Supporting Actress	The Devil Wears Prada	Runner-up	
Boston Society of Film Critics	2009	Best Actress	Julie & Julia	Won	
Boston Society of Film Critics	2011	Best Actress	The Iron Lady	Runner-up	
Boston Society of Film Critics	2019	Best Cast	Little Women	Won	
Britannia Awards	2015	Stanley Kubrick Britannia Award for Excellence in Film †	Meryl Streep	Won	
British Independent Film Awards	2012	Best Performance by an Actress in a British Independent Film	The Iron Lady	Nominated	
Cannes Film Festival	1989	Best Actress	A Cry in the Dark	Won	
Cannes Film Festival	2024	Honorary Palme d'Or †	Meryl Streep	Won	
Capri Hollywood International Film Festival	2013	Best Actress	August: Osage County	Won	
Capri Hollywood International Film Festival	2013	Best Ensemble Cast	August: Osage County	Won	
César Awards	2003	Honorary César Award †	Meryl Streep	Won	
Chicago Film Critics Association	1996	Best Actress	The Bridges of Madison County	Nominated	
Chicago Film Critics Association	2003	Best Supporting Actress	Adaptation	Won	
Chicago Film Critics Association	2006	Best Actress	The Devil Wears Prada	Nominated	
Chicago Film Critics Association	2008	Best Actress	Doubt	Nominated	
Chicago Film Critics Association	2009	Best Actress	Julie & Julia	Nominated	
Chicago Film Critics Association	2011	Best Actress	The Iron Lady	Nominated	
Chicago Film Critics Association	2013	Best Actress	August: Osage County	Nominated	
Chlotrudis Society for Independent Film	1997	Best Supporting Actress	Marvin's Room	Nominated	
Costume Designers Guild	2017	Distinguished Collaborator Award †	Meryl Streep	Won	
Dallas–Fort Worth Film Critics Association	2003	Best Supporting Actress	Adaptation	Runner-up	
Dallas–Fort Worth Film Critics Association	2005	Best Supporting Actress	The Manchurian Candidate	5th place	
Dallas–Fort Worth Film Critics Association	2006	Best Actress	The Devil Wears Prada	3rd place	
Dallas–Fort Worth Film Critics Association	2008	Best Actress	Doubt	Runner-up	
Dallas–Fort Worth Film Critics Association	2009	Best Actress	Julie & Julia	Runner-up	
Dallas–Fort Worth Film Critics Association	2011	Best Actress	The Iron Lady	3rd place	
Dallas–Fort Worth Film Critics Association	2013	Best Actress	August: Osage County	4th place	
Dallas–Fort Worth Film Critics Association	2017	Best Actress	The Post	5th place	
David di Donatello	1982	Best Foreign Actress	The French Lieutenant's Woman	Nominated	
David di Donatello	1984	Best Foreign Actress	Sophie's Choice	Nominated	
David di Donatello	1985	Best Foreign Actress	Falling in Love	Won	
David di Donatello	1986	Best Foreign Actress	Out of Africa	Won	
Detroit Film Critics Society	2008	Best Actress	Doubt	Nominated	
Detroit Film Critics Society	2009	Best Actress	Julie & Julia	Nominated	
Detroit Film Critics Society	2011	Best Actress	The Iron Lady	Nominated	
Detroit Film Critics Society	2013	Best Actress	August: Osage County	Nominated	
Detroit Film Critics Society	2013	Best Ensemble	August: Osage County	Nominated	
Detroit Film Critics Society	2014	Best Ensemble	Into the Woods	Nominated	
Detroit Film Critics Society	2017	Best Ensemble	The Post	Won	
Dorian Awards	2012	Film Performance of the Year	The Iron Lady	Won	
Dorian Awards	2018	Timeless Star †	Meryl Streep	Won	
Drama Desk Awards	1976	Outstanding Actress in a Play	Secret Service; A Memory of Two Mondays 27 Wagons Full of Cotton; Trelawny of the "Wells"	Nominated	
Drama Desk Awards	1977	Outstanding Actress in a Musical	Happy End	Nominated	
Drama Desk Awards	1977	Outstanding Featured Actress in a Play	The Cherry Orchard	Nominated	
Drama Desk Awards	2002	Outstanding Actress in a Play	The Seagull	Nominated	
Drama Desk Awards	2007	Outstanding Actress in a Play	Mother Courage and Her Children	Nominated	
Dublin Film Critics' Circle	2006	Best Supporting Actress	The Devil Wears Prada	3rd place	
Dublin Film Critics' Circle	2009	Best Actress	Doubt	5th place	
Empire Awards	2012	Best Actress	The Iron Lady	Nominated	
Entertainment Industries Council	2014	Performance in a Feature Film	August: Osage County	Nominated	
Eugene O'Neill Theater Center	2014	Monte Cristo Award †	Meryl Streep	Won	
Film Society of Lincoln Center	2008	Chaplin Award Gala Tribute †	Meryl Streep	Won	
Florida Film Critics Circle	2002	Best Supporting Actress	Adaptation	Won	
Florida Film Critics Circle	2019	Best Cast	Little Women	Won	
George Eastman Museum	1999	George Eastman Award †	Meryl Streep	Won	
Georgia Film Critics Association	2018	Best Ensemble	The Post	Nominated	
Georgia Film Critics Association	2020	Best Ensemble	Little Women	Won	
Giffoni Film Festival	2014	Fellowship Award †	Meryl Streep	Won	
Golden Schmoes Awards	2002	Best Supporting Actress of the Year	Adaptation	Nominated	
Golden Schmoes Awards	2008	Best Actress of the Year	Doubt	Nominated	
Golden Schmoes Awards	2009	Best Actress of the Year	Julie & Julia	Nominated	
Goldene Kamera	2009	Best Actress – International	Meryl Streep	Won	
Gotham Awards	1999	Career Tribute †	Meryl Streep	Won	
Gotham Awards	2006	Best Ensemble Cast	A Prairie Home Companion	Nominated	
Gracie Awards	2005	Individual Achievement Award – Outstanding Female Lead in a Drama Special	Angels in America	Won	
Guinness World Records	2017	Most Golden Globes Won by an Actress †	Meryl Streep	Won	
Guinness World Records	2017	Most Golden Globes †	Meryl Streep	Won	
Guinness World Records	2018	Most Golden Globes Nominations for an Actress †	Meryl Streep	Won	
Guinness World Records	2018	Most Oscar Nominations for an Actress †	Meryl Streep	Won	
Hasty Pudding Theatricals	1980	Woman of the Year †	Meryl Streep	Won	
Hollywood Film Awards	2013	Hollywood Ensemble Award	August: Osage County	Won	
Houston Film Critics Society	2008	Best Actress	Doubt	Nominated	
Houston Film Critics Society	2008	Best Ensemble Cast	Doubt	Won	
Houston Film Critics Society	2009	Best Actress	Julie & Julia	Nominated	
Houston Film Critics Society	2011	Best Actress	The Iron Lady	Nominated	
Houston Film Critics Society	2013	Best Actress	August: Osage County	Nominated	
IGN Movie Awards	2014	Best Movie Supporting Actress	Into the Woods	Nominated	
IndieWire Critics Poll	2006	Best Supporting Performance	A Prairie Home Companion	8th place	
IndieWire Critics Poll	2006	Best Lead Performance	The Devil Wears Prada	7th place	
IndieWire Critics Poll	2009	Best Lead Performance	Julie & Julia	8th place (Note: Tied with Jeff Bridges for Crazy Heart and Nicolas Cage for Bad Lieutenant: Port of Call New Orleans.)	
International Cinephile Society	2007	Best Supporting Actress	A Prairie Home Companion	Runner-up	
International Cinephile Society	2010	Best Actress	Julie & Julia	Nominated	
Iowa Film Critics Association	2009	Best Actress	Doubt	Won	
Irish Film & Television Academy Awards	1999	Best Actress	Dancing at Lughnasa	Nominated	
Irish Film & Television Academy Awards	2009	Best International Actress	Mamma Mia!	Won	
Irish Film & Television Academy Awards	2010	Best International Actress	It's Complicated	Won	
Irish Film & Television Academy Awards	2012	Best International Actress	The Iron Lady	Nominated	
Italian Online Movie Awards	2012	Best Actress	The Iron Lady	Won	
Italian Online Movie Awards	2007	Best Supporting Actress	The Devil Wears Prada	Won	
Jupiter Award	2013	Best International Actress	Hope Springs	Nominated	
Jupiter Award	2015	Best International Actress	August: Osage County	Nominated	
Jupiter Award	2016	Best International Actress	Into the Woods	Nominated	
Jupiter Award	2017	Best International Actress	Florence Foster Jenkins	Nominated	
Kansas City Film Critics Circle	2009	Best Actress	Julie & Julia	Won	
Kansas City Film Critics Circle	2008	Best Actress	Doubt	Won	
Kansas City Film Critics Circle	1985	Best Actress	Out of Africa	Won	
Kansas City Film Critics Circle	1983	Best Actress	Silkwood	Won	
Kansas City Film Critics Circle	1982	Best Actress	Sophie's Choice	Won	
Kansas City Film Critics Circle	1979	Best Supporting Actress	Kramer vs Kramer	Won	
L.A Outfest	2003	Best Performance by an Actress in a Leading Role	The Hours	Won	
London Film Critics' Circle	2004	Actress of the Year	Adaptation	Nominated	
London Film Critics' Circle	2007	Actress of the Year	The Devil Wears Prada	Won	
London Film Critics' Circle	2009	Actress of the Year	Doubt	Nominated	
London Film Critics' Circle	2010	Actress of the Year	Julie & Julia	Nominated	
London Film Critics' Circle	2012	Actress of the Year	The Iron Lady	Won (Note: Tied with Anna Paquin for Margaret.)	
Los Angeles Film Critics Association	1979	Best Supporting Actress	Kramer vs. Kramer; Manhattan; The Seduction of Joe Tynan	Won	
Los Angeles Film Critics Association	1981	Best Actress	The French Lieutenant's Woman	Won	
Los Angeles Film Critics Association	1982	Best Actress	Sophie's Choice	Won	
Los Angeles Film Critics Association	1985	Best Actress	Out of Africa	Won	
Made in NY Awards	2012	Honoree	Meryl Streep	Won	
Moscow International Film Festival	2004	Stanislavsky Award †	Meryl Streep	Won	
MTV Movie Awards	2007	Best Villain	The Devil Wears Prada	Nominated	
MTV Movie Awards	2015	Best Villain	Into the Woods	Won	
Nastro d'Argento	1984	Best Foreign Actress	Silkwood	Nominated	
Nastro d'Argento	1986	Best Foreign Actress	Out of Africa	Nominated	
National Board of Review	1979	Best Supporting Actress	Kramer vs. Kramer; Manhattan; The Seduction of Joe Tynan	Won	
National Board of Review	1982	Best Actress	Sophie's Choice	Won	
National Board of Review	2008	Best Acting by an Ensemble	Doubt	Won	
National Board of Review	2009	Best Acting by an Ensemble	It's Complicated	Won	
National Board of Review	2017	Best Actress	The Post	Won	
National Movie Awards	2008	Best Performance – Female	Mamma Mia!	Won	
National Society of Film Critics	1978	Best Supporting Actress	The Deer Hunter	Won	
National Society of Film Critics	1979	Best Supporting Actress	Kramer vs. Kramer; Manhattan; The Seduction of Joe Tynan	Won	
National Society of Film Critics	1982	Best Actress	Sophie's Choice	Won	
National Society of Film Critics	1995	Best Actress	The Bridges of Madison County	3rd place	
National Society of Film Critics	2006	Best Supporting Actress	The Devil Wears Prada; A Prairie Home Companion	Won	
National Society of Film Critics	2009	Best Actress	Julie & Julia; Fantastic Mr. Fox	Runner-up	
National Society of Film Critics	2011	Best Actress	The Iron Lady	3rd place	
New York Film Critics Circle	1978	Best Supporting Actress	The Deer Hunter	3rd place	
New York Film Critics Circle	1979	Best Supporting Actress	Kramer vs. Kramer; The Seduction of Joe Tynan	Won	
New York Film Critics Circle	1982	Best Actress	Sophie's Choice	Won	
New York Film Critics Circle	1983	Best Actress	Silkwood	3rd Place	
New York Film Critics Circle	1985	Best Actress	Out of Africa; Plenty	Runner-up	
New York Film Critics Circle	1988	Best Actress	A Cry in the Dark	Won	
New York Film Critics Circle	2006	Best Actress	The Devil Wears Prada	Runner-up	
New York Film Critics Circle	2009	Best Actress	Julie & Julia	Won	
New York Film Critics Circle	2011	Best Actress	The Iron Lady	Won	
New York Film Critics Online	2009	Best Actress	Julie & Julia	Won	
New York Film Critics Online	2011	Best Actress	The Iron Lady	Won	
New York Women in Film & Television	1983	Muse Award †	Meryl Streep	Won	
Nickelodeon Kids' Choice Awards	2015	Favorite Villain	Into the Woods	Nominated	
Obie Award	1981	Distinguished Performance by an Actress	Alice in Concert	Won	
Online Film Critics Society	2002	Best Supporting Actress	Adaptation	Nominated	
Online Film Critics Society	2002	Best Ensemble	Adaptation	Nominated	
Online Film Critics Society	2006	Best Actress	The Devil Wears Prada	Nominated	
Online Film Critics Society	2008	Best Actress	Doubt	Nominated	
Online Film Critics Society	2009	Best Actress	Julie & Julia	Nominated	
Online Film Critics Society	2011	Best Actress	The Iron Lady	Nominated	
Online Film Critics Society	2017	Best Ensemble	The Post	Nominated	
Online Film & Television Association (OFTA) Awards	1997	Film Hall of Fame	Meryl Streep	Won	
Online Film & Television Association (OFTA) Awards	2002	Best Supporting Actress	Adaptation	Won	
Online Film & Television Association (OFTA) Awards	2003	Best Actress in a Motion Picture or Miniseries	Angels in America	Won	
Online Film & Television Association (OFTA) Awards	2003	Best Ensemble in a Motion Picture or Miniseries	Angels in America	Won	
Online Film & Television Association (OFTA) Awards	2008	Best Actress	Doubt	Won	
Outer Critics Circle Award	1976	Outstanding Performance	A Memory of Two Mondays; 27 Wagons Full of Cotton	Won	
Outfest	2003	Screen Idol Awards	The Hours	Won	
Palm Springs International Film Festival	2014	Icon Award †	Meryl Streep	Won	
Palm Springs International Film Festival	2019	Ensemble Cast Award	Mary Poppins Returns	Won	
People's Choice Awards	1984	Favorite Motion Picture Actress	Meryl Streep	Won	
People's Choice Awards	1985	Favorite Motion Picture Actress	Meryl Streep	Won	
People's Choice Awards	1986	Favorite Motion Picture Actress	Meryl Streep	Won	
People's Choice Awards	1986	Favorite All-Around Female Entertainer	Meryl Streep	Won	
People's Choice Awards	1987	Favorite Motion Picture Actress	Meryl Streep	Won	
People's Choice Awards	1989	Favorite Actress in a Dramatic Motion Picture	Meryl Streep	Won	
People's Choice Awards	1990	World-Favorite Motion Picture Actress	Meryl Streep	Won	
People's Choice Awards	1990	Favorite Motion Picture Actress	Meryl Streep	Won	
People's Choice Awards	2009	Favorite Cast	Mamma Mia!	Nominated	
People's Choice Awards	2009	Favorite Song from a Soundtrack	"Mamma Mia"	Won	
People's Choice Awards	2013	Favorite Movie Icon	Meryl Streep	Won	
People's Choice Awards	2013	Favorite Dramatic Movie Actress	Meryl Streep	Nominated	
People's Choice Awards	2015	Favorite Dramatic Movie Actress	Meryl Streep	Nominated	
People's Choice Awards	2016	Favorite Movie Actress	Meryl Streep	Nominated	
People's Choice Awards	2024	TV Performance of the Year	Only Murders in the Building	Nominated	
Rembrandt Award	2007	Best Foreign Actress	The Devil Wears Prada	Won	
Rembrandt Award	2009	Best Foreign Actress	Mamma Mia!	Won	
Rembrandt Award	2013	Best Foreign Actress	The Iron Lady	Won	
Rome Film Festival	2009	Golden Marc'Aurelio Acting Award†	Meryl Streep	Won	
Rungstedlund Foundation	1993	Rungstedlund Award †	Out of Africa, based on a memoir written by Karen Blixen	Won	
Russian National Movie Awards	2007	Best Foreign Actress	The Ant Bully; The Devil Wears Prada; A Prairie Home Companion	Won	
Russian National Movie Awards	2009	Best Foreign Actress	Mamma Mia!	Won	
Russian National Movie Awards	2010	Best Foreign Actress	Doubt; Julie & Julia	Nominated	
Russian National Movie Awards	2014	Best Foreign Actress of the Decade	Meryl Streep	Nominated	
San Diego Film Critics Society	2017	Best Ensemble	The Post	Nominated	
San Francisco Film Critics Circle	2009	Best Actress	Julie & Julia	Won	
San Francisco Film Critics Circle	2013	Best Actress	August: Osage County	Nominated	
San Sebastián International Film Festival	2008	Donostia Award †	Meryl Streep	Won	
Satellite Awards	1998	Best Actress in a Mini-Series or Motion Picture Made for TV	...First Do No Harm	Nominated	
Satellite Awards	1999	Best Actress in a Motion Picture – Drama	One True Thing	Nominated	
Satellite Awards	2003	Best Actress in a Motion Picture – Drama	The Hours	Nominated	
Satellite Awards	2003	Best Supporting Actress in a Motion Picture – Comedy or Musical	Adaptation	Nominated	
Satellite Awards	2004	Best Actress in a Mini-Series or Motion Picture Made for TV	Angels in America	Won	
Satellite Awards	2007	Best Actress in a Motion Picture – Comedy or Musical	The Devil Wears Prada	Won	
Satellite Awards	2008	Best Actress in a Motion Picture – Comedy or Musical	Mamma Mia!	Nominated	
Satellite Awards	2008	Best Actress in a Motion Picture – Drama	Doubt	Nominated	
Satellite Awards	2009	Best Actress in a Motion Picture – Comedy or Musical	Julie & Julia	Won	
Satellite Awards	2011	Best Actress in a Motion Picture	The Iron Lady	Nominated	
Satellite Awards	2013	Best Actress in a Motion Picture	August: Osage County	Nominated	
Satellite Awards	2014	Best Ensemble – Motion Picture	Into the Woods	Won	
Satellite Awards	2016	Best Actress in a Motion Picture	Florence Foster Jenkins	Nominated	
Satellite Awards	2020	Best Supporting Actress – Series, Mini-Series, or TV Film	Big Little Lies	Nominated	
Satellite Awards	2021	Best Actress in a Motion Picture – Comedy or Musical	The Prom	Nominated	
Saturn Awards	1992	Best Actress	Defending Your Life	Nominated	
Saturn Awards	1993	Best Actress	Death Becomes Her	Nominated	
Saturn Awards	2005	Best Supporting Actress	The Manchurian Candidate	Nominated	
Saturn Awards	2015	Best Supporting Actress	Into the Woods	Nominated	
Seattle Film Critics Society	2017	Best Actress	The Post	Nominated	
Seattle Film Critics Society	2017	Best Ensemble Cast	The Post	Nominated	
Seattle Film Critics Society	2019	Best Ensemble Cast	Little Women	Nominated	
Society of Operating Cameramen	2018	President's Award †	Meryl Streep	Won	
St. Louis Gateway Film Critics Association	2011	Best Actress	The Iron Lady	Runner-up	
St. Louis Gateway Film Critics Association	2013	Best Actress	August: Osage County	Runner-up	
St. Louis Gateway Film Critics Association	2017	Best Actress	The Post	Nominated	
Teen Choice Awards	2006	Choice Movie: Chemistry	Meryl Streep and Anne Hathaway for The Devil Wears Prada	Nominated	
Teen Choice Awards	2006	Choice Movie: Sleazebag	The Devil Wears Prada	Nominated	
Telluride Film Festival	1998	Silver Medallion †	Meryl Streep	Won	
Theatre World Award	1976	Outstanding Broadway or Off-Broadway Debuts	27 Wagons Full of Cotton	Won	
Toronto Film Critics Association	2008	Best Actress	Doubt	Nominated	
Toronto Film Critics Association	2009	Best Actress	Julie & Julia	Nominated	
Toronto Film Critics Association	2011	Best Actress	The Iron Lady	Nominated	
Toronto International Film Festival	2019	TIFF Tribute Actor Award †	Meryl Streep	Won	
Valladolid International Film Festival	1986	Best Actress	Heartburn	Won	
Vancouver Film Critics Circle	2008	Best Actress	Doubt	Nominated	
Vancouver Film Critics Circle	2009	Best Actress	Julie & Julia	Nominated	
Vancouver Film Critics Circle	2011	Best Actress	The Iron Lady	Nominated	
Village Voice Film Poll	2009	Best Actress	Julie & Julia	5th place	
Village Voice Film Poll	2011	Best Actress	The Iron Lady	8th place	
Village Voice Film Poll	2017	Best Actress	The Post	18th place	
Washington DC Area Film Critics Association	2008	Best Acting Ensemble	Doubt	Won	
Washington DC Area Film Critics Association	2008	Best Actress	Doubt	Won	
Washington DC Area Film Critics Association	2009	Best Actress	Julie & Julia	Nominated	
Washington DC Area Film Critics Association	2011	Best Actress	The Iron Lady	Nominated	
Washington DC Area Film Critics Association	2013	Best Actress	August: Osage County	Nominated	
Washington DC Area Film Critics Association	2013	Best Acting Ensemble	August: Osage County	Nominated	
Washington DC Area Film Critics Association	2014	Best Acting Ensemble	Into the Woods	Nominated	
Washington DC Area Film Critics Association	2017	Best Acting Ensemble	The Post	Nominated	
Washington DC Area Film Critics Association	2017	Best Actress	The Post	Nominated	
Washington DC Area Film Critics Association	2019	Best Acting Ensemble	Little Women	Nominated	
Women Film Critics Circle	2006	Best Comedic Performance	The Devil Wears Prada	Won	
Women Film Critics Circle	2008	Lifetime Achievement Award †	Meryl Streep	Won	
Women Film Critics Circle	2008	Best Comedic Actress	Mamma Mia!	Won	
Women Film Critics Circle	2009	Best Comedic Actress	Julie & Julia	Won	
Women Film Critics Circle	2011	Best Actress	The Iron Lady	Nominated	
Women Film Critics Circle	2011	Best Screen Couple	Meryl Streep and Jim Broadbent for The Iron Lady	Nominated	
Women Film Critics Circle	2013	Woman's Work / Best Ensemble	August: Osage County	Runner-up (Note: Tied with cast of Winnie Mandela.)	
Women Film Critics Circle	2014	Woman's Work / Best Ensemble	The Homesman	Won	
Women Film Critics Circle	2015	Woman's Work / Best Ensemble	Suffragette	Won	
Women in Film and Television International	1998	Crystal Awards †	Meryl Streep	Won	
Women's Image Network Awards	2008	Outstanding Actress Feature Film	Mamma Mia!	Won	
Women's Image Network Awards	2009	Outstanding Actress Feature Film	Julie & Julia	Nominated	
Women's Image Network Awards	2018	Outstanding Actress Feature Film	The Post	Nominated	

== State and academic honours ==
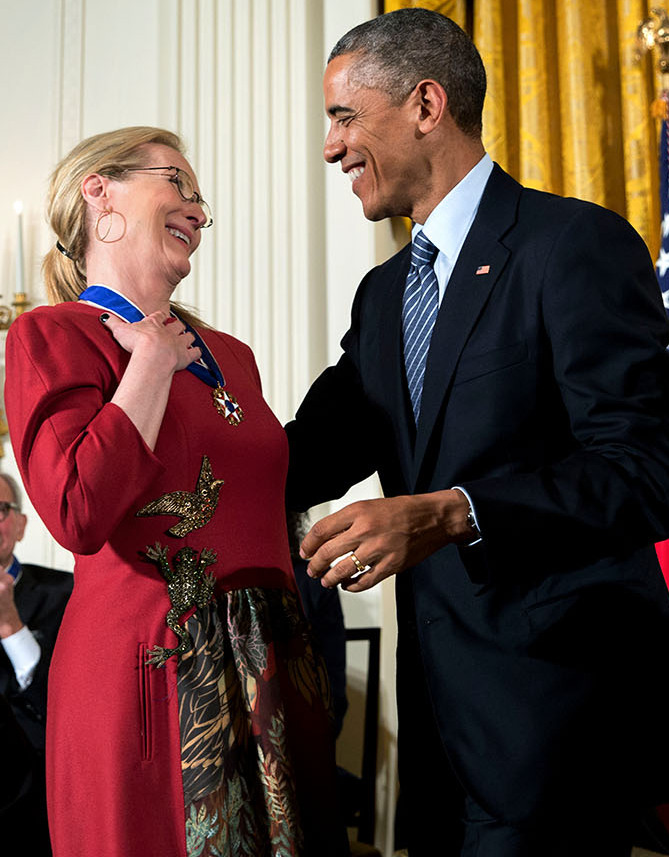
President Barack Obama presents the Presidential Medal of Freedom to Streep

State and academic honours for Streep
Country or organization	Year	Award	Ref(s)
Barnard College of Columbia University	2010	Medal of Distinction	
Dartmouth College	1981	Honorary Degree	
France	2003	Ordre des Arts et des Lettres	
Harvard University	2010	Honorary Doctor of Arts	
Hollywood Chamber of Commerce	1998	Hollywood Walk of Fame	
Indiana University Bloomington	2014	Doctor of Humane Letters	
John F. Kennedy Center for the Performing Arts	2011	Kennedy Center Honors	
Middlebury College	2004	Honorary Doctor of Arts	
New Jersey Hall of Fame	2008 (Note: Despite being one of the inaugural class of inductees in 2008, Streep has yet to be properly inducted to the New Jersey Hall of Fame.)	Arts & Entertainment	
New York City	2012	Made in NY	
Princeton University	2009	Honorary Doctor of Fine Arts	
Spain	2023	Princess of Asturias Award for the Arts	
United States	2010	National Medal of Arts	
United States	2014	Presidential Medal of Freedom	
University of New Hampshire	2003	Doctor of Humane Letters	
Yale University	1983	Honorary Doctor of Fine Arts	

== See also ==
- Meryl Streep on screen and stage
- List of Academy Award records
- List of actors with two or more Academy Awards in acting categories
- List of actors with two or more Academy Award nominations in acting categories
- List of actors with Academy Award nominations
- List of stars on the Hollywood Walk of Fame
- List of actors with Hollywood Walk of Fame motion picture stars
- List of Yale University people
- Triple Crown of Acting
- List of EGOT winners
