= Meryl Streep on screen and stage =

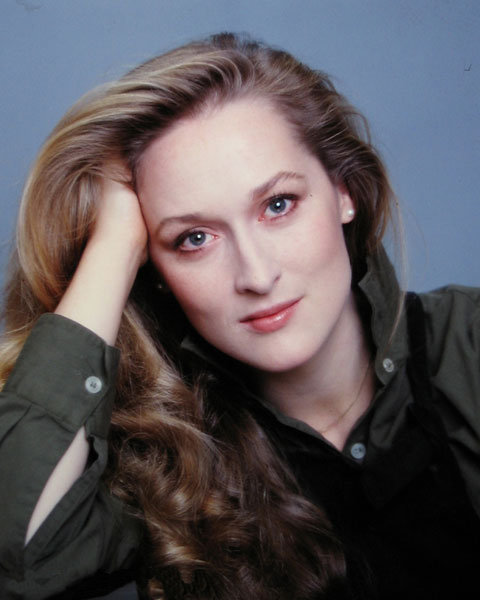
Streep in 1979

Meryl Streep is an American actress who has had an extensive career in film, television, and stage. She made her broadway stage debut in 1975 with The Public Theater production of Trelawny of the 'Wells'. She went on to perform several roles on stage in the 1970s, gaining a Tony Award nomination for her role in 27 Wagons Full of Cotton (1976). In 1977, Streep made her film debut with a brief role alongside Jane Fonda in Julia. A supporting role in the war drama The Deer Hunter (1978) proved to be a breakthrough for Streep; she received her first Academy Award nomination for it. She won the award the following year for playing a troubled wife in the top-grossing drama Kramer vs. Kramer (1979). In 1978, Streep played a German, "Aryan" woman married to a Jewish man in Nazi Germany in the television miniseries Holocaust, which earned her a Primetime Emmy Award.

Streep established herself as a leading Hollywood actress in the 1980s. She played dual roles in the period drama The French Lieutenant's Woman (1981), and starred as a Polish Holocaust survivor in Sophie's Choice (1982). She was awarded the Best Actress Oscar for the latter. Streep portrayed the real-life character of Karen Silkwood in Mike Nichols' drama Silkwood (1983), before starring in her most financially successful release of the decade, the romantic drama Out of Africa (1985), in which she played the Danish writer Karen Blixen. With intermittent successes, Streep's career went through a period of relative decline post-1985, with several commentators criticizing her inclination towards melodramatic roles, despite her attempt at playing against-type in the comedies She-Devil (1989) and Death Becomes Her (1992).

In 1995, Streep starred opposite Clint Eastwood as an unhappily married woman in The Bridges of Madison County, her biggest critical and commercial success of the decade. Although her dramas of the late 1990s received a mixed reception overall, she was praised for her role as a cancer patient in One True Thing (1998). She had acclaimed roles in the 2002 films Adaptation. and The Hours, and won a second Emmy Award for the television miniseries Angels in America a year later. Greater success returned to Streep in 2006, with an Academy Award-nominated role as a ruthless fashion magazine editor in the comedy-drama The Devil Wears Prada. This led to starring roles in several high-profile films, including the US$609 million-grossing romantic comedy Mamma Mia! (2008), her highest-grossing release, and the comedy-drama Julie & Julia (2009), in which she played Julia Child. These roles re-established Streep's stardom. Her portrayal of Margaret Thatcher in the biopic The Iron Lady (2011) earned her another Academy Award for Best Actress. Further Oscar nominations came for her starring roles in August: Osage County (2013), Into the Woods (2014), Florence Foster Jenkins (2016), and The Post (2017), setting a record for more nominations than any actor or actress in history.

== Filmography ==
=== Film ===
Year	Title	Role	Notes	Ref.
1977	Julia	Anne Marie		
1978	The Deer Hunter	Linda	Academy Award nomination for Best Supporting Actress	
1979	Manhattan	Jill Davis		
1979	The Seduction of Joe Tynan	Karen Traynor		
1979	Kramer vs. Kramer	Joanna Kramer	Academy Award win for Best Supporting Actress	
1981	The French Lieutenant's Woman	Sarah Woodruff / Anna (Note: Streep played dual roles in the film.)	Academy Award nomination for Best Actress	
1982	Still of the Night	Brooke Reynolds		
1982	Sophie's Choice	Sophie Zawistowski	Academy Award win for Best Actress	
1983	Silkwood	Karen Silkwood	Academy Award nomination for Best Actress	
1984	Falling in Love	Molly Gilmore		
1985	Plenty	Susan Traherne		
1985	Out of Africa	Karen Blixen	Academy Award nomination for Best Actress	
1986	Heartburn	Rachel Samstat		
1987	Ironweed	Helen Archer	Academy Award nomination for Best Actress	
1988	Evil Angels	Lindy Chamberlain	aka A Cry in the Dark; Academy Award nomination for Best Actress	
1989	She-Devil	Mary Fisher		
1990	Postcards from the Edge	Suzanne Vale	Academy Award nomination for Best Actress	
1991	Defending Your Life	Julia		
1991	Age 7 in America	Narrator	Documentary	
1992	Death Becomes Her	Madeline Ashton		
1993	The House of the Spirits	Clara del Valle Trueba		
1994	The River Wild	Gail Hartman		
1995	The Living Sea	Narrator	Documentary	
1995	The Bridges of Madison County	Francesca Johnson	Academy Award nomination for Best Actress	
1996	Before and After	Dr. Carolyn Ryan		
1996	Marvin's Room	Lee		
1998	One True Thing	Kate Gulden	Academy Award nomination for Best Actress	
1998	Dancing at Lughnasa	Kate Mundy		
1999	Music of the Heart	Roberta Guaspari	Academy Award nomination for Best Actress	
1999	Ginevra's Story	Narrator	Documentary	
2001	A.I. Artificial Intelligence	Blue Mecha	Voice	
2002	Adaptation.	Susan Orlean	Academy Award nomination for Best Supporting Actress	
2002	The Hours	Clarissa Vaughan		
2003	Stuck on You	Herself	Uncredited cameo	
2004	The Manchurian Candidate	Sen. Eleanor Prentiss Shaw		
2004	Lemony Snicket's A Series of Unfortunate Events	Aunt Josephine		
2005	Prime	Lisa Metzger		
2005	Stolen Childhoods	Narrator	Documentary	
2006	A Prairie Home Companion	Yolanda Johnson		
2006	The Music of Regret	The Woman	Short film	
2006	Hurricane on the Bayou	Narrator	Documentary short film	
2006	The Devil Wears Prada	Miranda Priestly	Academy Award nomination for Best Actress	
2006	The Ant Bully	Queen Ant		
2007	Dark Matter	Joanna Silver		
2007	Evening	Lila Ross		
2007	Rendition	Corrine Whitman		
2007	Lions for Lambs	Janine Roth		
2008	Mamma Mia!	Donna Sheridan		
2008	Doubt	Sister Aloysius Beauvier	Academy Award nomination for Best Actress	
2009	Julie & Julia	Julia Child	Academy Award nomination for Best Actress	
2009	Fantastic Mr. Fox	Felicity Fox	Voice; animated film	
2009	It's Complicated	Jane Adler		
2010	Higglety Pigglety Pop! or There Must Be More to Life	Jennie	Voice; short film	
2011	The Iron Lady	Margaret Thatcher	Academy Award win for Best Actress	
2012	To the Arctic 3D	Narrator	Documentary	
2012	Hope Springs	Kay Soames		
2013	Wings of Life	Narrator	Documentary	
2013	Girl Rising	Narrator	Documentary	
2013	A Fierce Green Fire	Narrator	Documentary	
2013	Out of Print	Narrator	Documentary	
2013	August: Osage County	Violet Weston	Academy Award nomination for Best Actress	
2014	The Giver	Chief Elder		
2014	The Homesman	Altha Carter		
2014	Into the Woods	The Witch	Academy Award nomination for Best Supporting Actress	
2015	Ricki and the Flash	Ricki Rendazzo		
2015	Suffragette	Emmeline Pankhurst		
2015	Shout Gladi Gladi	Narrator	Documentary	
2016	Florence Foster Jenkins	Florence Foster Jenkins	Academy Award nomination for Best Actress	
2017	We Rise	Narrator	Documentary	
2017	Little Door Gods	Narrator	Voice (English dub); animated film; aka The Guardian Brothers	
2017	The Post	Katharine Graham	Academy Award nomination for Best Actress	
2018	Mamma Mia! Here We Go Again	Donna Sheridan		
2018	This Changes Everything	Herself	Documentary	
2018	Mary Poppins Returns	Topsy		
2019	The Laundromat	Ellen Martin / Elena / Herself		
2019	Little Women	Aunt March		
2020	Here We Are: Notes for Living on Planet Earth	Narrator	Voice; animated short film	
2020	Let Them All Talk	Alice Hughes		
2020	The Prom	Dee Dee Allen		
2021	Don't Look Up	President Janie Orlean		
2022	Sell/Buy/Date	—N/a	Executive producer	
2024	Schindler Space Architect	Narrator	Documentary	
2026	Hoppers	The Insect Queen	Voice cameo	
2026	Project Hail Mary	Rocky	Voice cameo	
2026	The Devil Wears Prada 2	Miranda Priestly		
2026	My Undesirable Friends: Part II – Exile	—N/a	Executive producer	
2027	Narnia: The Magician's Nephew †	Aslan	Post-production; Voice	
TBA	Lincoln in the Bardo †	Abigail Blass / Elizabeth Crawford / Angel / Demon	In production; Voice	

=== Television ===
Year	Title	Role	Notes	Ref.
1976	Everybody Rides the Carousel	Lover	Voice; television film	
1977	The Deadliest Season	Sharon Miller	Television film	
1977–1979	Great Performances	Edith Varney	Episode: "Secret Service"	
1977–1979	Great Performances	Leilah	Episode: "Uncommon Women and Others"	
1978	Holocaust	Inga Helms Weiss	Miniseries; 4 episodes	
1981	Kiss Me, Petruchio	Katherine	Documentary	
1982	Alice at the Palace	Alice	Television film	
1990	The Earth Day Special	Concerned Citizen	Television special	
1994	The Simpsons	Jessica Lovejoy	Voice; Episode: "Bart's Girlfriend"	
1997	...First Do No Harm	Lori Reimuller	Television film; also producer	
1999	King of the Hill	Aunt Esme Dauterive	Voice; Episode: "A Beer Can Named Desire"	
2003	Angels in America	Hannah Pitt / Ethel Rosenberg / The Rabbi / The Angel Australia (Note: Streep played quadruple roles in the miniseries.)	Miniseries; 6 episodes	
2003	Freedom: A History of US	Abigail Adams / Mary Eastey / Mother Jones / Margaret Chase Smith (Note: Streep played separate characters in each episode.)	Voice; documentary; 4 episodes	
2007	Ocean Voyagers	Narrator	Documentary	
2010–2012	Web Therapy	Camilla Bowner	Guest star; 5 episodes	
2013	Makers: Women Who Make America	Narrator	Documentary; 3 episodes	
2014	The Roosevelts	Eleanor Roosevelt	Voice; documentary; 7 episodes	
2017	Five Came Back	Narrator	Documentary; 3 episodes	
2019	Big Little Lies	Mary Louise Wright	Main role (season 2); 7 episodes	
2023	Extrapolations	Eve Shearer	Episode: "2046: Whale Fall"	
2023–2025	Only Murders in the Building	Loretta Durkin	Special guest (seasons 3–5); 11 episodes	
2024	Corridors of Power: Should America Police the World?	Narrator	Documentary; 8 episodes	
2025	Saturday Night Live 50th Anniversary Special	Herself / Colleen Rafferty Sr.	Television special	
2025	The American Revolution	Mercy Otis Warren	Voice; documentary; 3 episodes	
2026	Henry David Thoreau	Lidian Emerson / Margaret Fuller / Mary Merrick Brooks / Maria Thoreau	Voice; documentary	

Key
†	Denotes television productions that have not yet been released

== Stage ==
Year	Title	Role	Venue	Ref.
1971	The Playboy of Seville	Tisbea	Cubiculo Theatre; Off-Broadway debut	
1974	The Frogs	singer	Yale Repertory Theatre	
1974	The Possessed	Lisa Drozdov	Yale Repertory Theatre	
1974	The Idiots Karamazov	Constance Garnett	Yale Repertory Theatre	
1975	The Shaft of Love	Jean	Yale Repertory Theatre	
1975	Trelawny of the 'Wells'	Miss Imogen Parrott	Vivian Beaumont Theater; Broadway debut	
1976	A Memory of Two Mondays 27 Wagons Full of Cotton (Note: The two plays were part of a double-bill production.)	Patricia / Flora Meighan	Playhouse Theatre	
1976	Secret Service	Edith Varney	Playhouse Theatre	
1976	Henry V	Catherine	Delacorte Theater	
1976	Measure for Measure	Isabella	Delacorte Theater	
1977	The Cherry Orchard	Dunyasha	Vivian Beaumont Theater	
1977	Happy End	Lt. Lillian Holiday	Martin Beck Theatre	
1978	The Taming of the Shrew	Katharina Minola	Delacorte Theater	
1979	Taken in Marriage	Andrea	Joseph Papp Public Theater & Newman Theater	
1980–1981	Alice in Concert	Alice	Joseph Papp Public Theater & Anspacher Theater	
2001	The Seagull	Irina Arkadina	Delacorte Theater	
2004	Bridge and Tunnel	—N/a	Producer; Theatres at 45 Bleecker & Bleecker Street Theatre	
2006	Mother Courage and Her Children	Mother Courage	Delacorte Theater	

== See also ==
- List of awards and nominations received by Meryl Streep

== Bibliography ==
- Allen, David (January 4, 2002). Performing Chekhov. Routledge. ISBN 978-1-134-65796-4.
- Beck, Jerry (October 28, 2005). The Animated Movie Guide. Chicago Review Press. p. 329. ISBN 978-1-56976-222-6.
- Bergman, Paul; Asimow, Michael (April 1, 2006). Reel Justice: The Courtroom Goes to the Movies. Andrews McMeel Publishing. ISBN 978-0-7407-5460-9.
- Bigsby, Christopher (March 20, 2014). Remembering Arthur Miller. A&C Black. ISBN 978-1-4081-5016-0.
- Corliss, Richard (April 8, 2014). Mom in the Movies: The Iconic Screen Mothers You Love (and a Few You Love to Hate). Simon and Schuster. ISBN 978-1-4767-3828-4.
- Darren, Alison (February 17, 2000). Lesbian Film Guide. Bloomsbury Publishing. ISBN 978-1-4411-8364-4.
- Denby, David (August 4, 1986). "Marriage A La Mode". New York. ISSN 0028-7369.
- Dick, Bernard F. (1982). Hellman in Hollywood. Fairleigh Dickinson Univ Press. ISBN 978-0-8386-3140-9.
- Dunaway, Finis (2015). Seeing Green: The Use and Abuse of American Environmental Images. University of Chicago Press. ISBN 978-0-2261-6990-3.
- Ebert, Roger (June 15, 2009). Roger Ebert's Four Star Reviews—1967–2007. Andrews McMeel Publishing. ISBN 978-0-7407-9217-5.
- Funnell, Lisa; Yip, Man-Fung (September 19, 2014). American and Chinese-Language Cinemas: Examining Cultural Flows. Taylor & Francis. ISBN 978-1-317-91024-4.
- Grossman, Lawrence K.; Minow, Newton N. (2001). A Digital Gift to the Nation: Fulfilling the Promise of the Digital and Internet Age. Century Foundation Press. ISBN 978-0-87078-466-8.
- Hischak, Thomas S. (June 21, 2012). American Literature on Stage and Screen: 525 Works and Their Adaptations. McFarland. ISBN 978-0-7864-9279-4.
- Hollinger, Karen (2006). The Actress: Hollywood Acting and the Female Star. Routledge. ISBN 978-1-1352-0588-1.
- Insdorf, Annette (2003). Indelible Shadows: Film and the Holocaust. Cambridge University Press. ISBN 978-0-521-01630-8.
- Kachmar, Diane C. (January 1, 2002). Roy Scheider: A Film Biography. McFarland. ISBN 978-0-7864-1201-3.
- Longworth, Karina (2013). Meryl Streep: Anatomy of an Actor. Phaidon Press. ISBN 978-0-7148-6669-7.
- Montalbano, Dave (December 22, 2010). The Adventures of Cinema Dave in the Florida Motion Picture World. Xlibris Corporation. ISBN 978-1-4628-3673-4.
- Müller, Jürgen (2002). Movies of the 80s. Taschen. ISBN 978-3-8228-1737-7.
- Rice, Dona Herweck (August 1, 1999). The 20th Century Series: The Eighties. Teacher Created Resources. ISBN 978-1-57690-030-7.
- Santas, Constantine (2002). Responding to Film. Rowman & Littlefield. ISBN 978-0-8304-1580-9.
- Wolcott, James (October 1981). "Smitten Kittens". Texas Monthly. Emmis Communications. ISSN 0148-7736.
