= Pinocchio (1940 film) =

Disney animated film

- Theatrical release poster
- Directed by: Supervising Directors: Ben Sharpsteen; Hamilton Luske; Sequence Directors: Bill Roberts; Norman Ferguson; Jack Kinney; Wilfred Jackson; T. Hee
- Story by: Ted Sears; Otto Englander; Webb Smith; William Cottrell; Joseph Sabo; Erdman Penner; Aurelius Battaglia
- Based on: The Adventures of Pinocchio by Carlo Collodi
- Produced by: Walt Disney
- Music by: Leigh Harline; Paul J. Smith
- Production company: Walt Disney Productions
- Distributed by: RKO Radio Pictures
- Release dates: February 7, 1940 (Center Theatre); February 23, 1940 (United States)
- Running time: 88 minutes
- Country: United States
- Language: English
- Budget: $2.6 million
- Box office: $164 million

Pinocchio is a 1940 American animated musical fantasy film loosely based on Carlo Collodi's 1883 novel The Adventures of Pinocchio, produced by Walt Disney and released by RKO Radio Pictures. The production was supervised by Ben Sharpsteen and Hamilton Luske, and the film's sequences were directed by Bill Roberts, Norman Ferguson, Jack Kinney, Wilfred Jackson and T. Hee.

With the voices of Cliff Edwards, Dickie Jones, Christian Rub, Walter Catlett, Charles Judels, Evelyn Venable, Frankie Darro, Mel Blanc and Clarence Nash, the film follows a wooden puppet, Pinocchio, who is created by an old woodcarver, Geppetto, and brought to life by a blue fairy. Wishing to become a real boy, Pinocchio must prove himself to be "brave, truthful, and unselfish." Along his journey, Pinocchio encounters several characters representing the temptations and consequences of wrongdoing, as a cricket named Jiminy, who takes the role of Pinocchio's conscience, attempts to guide him in matters of right and wrong.

Pinocchio was a groundbreaking achievement in the area of effects animation, giving realistic movement to vehicles and machinery as well as natural elements such as rain, water, lightning, smoke, and shadow. After premiering at the Center Theatre in New York City on February 7, 1940, Pinocchio was released in theatres on February 23, 1940.

Although it received critical acclaim and became the first animated feature to win a competitive Academy Award — winning two for Best Music, Original Score and for Best Music, Original Song for "When You Wish Upon a Star" (the latter would later serve as the Walt Disney Company's signature song) — it was initially a commercial failure, mainly due to World War II cutting off the European and Asian markets. It eventually made a profit after its 1945 rerelease, and is considered one of the greatest animated films ever made, with a 100% rating on the website Rotten Tomatoes. The film and characters are still prevalent in popular culture, featuring at various Disney parks and other forms of entertainment. In 1994, Pinocchio was selected for preservation in the United States National Film Registry for being deemed "culturally, historically, or aesthetically significant."

== Plot ==
In a sleepy village in Italy, Jiminy Cricket arrives at the shop of a woodworker and toymaker named Geppetto, who lives with his pet cat Figaro and fish Cleo. He creates a puppet that he names Pinocchio. As he falls asleep, Geppetto wishes upon a star for Pinocchio to be a real boy. Late that night, the Blue Fairy visits the workshop and brings Pinocchio to life, although he remains a puppet. She informs him that if he proves himself to be brave, truthful, and unselfish, he will become a real boy. When Jiminy reveals himself, the Blue Fairy assigns him to be Pinocchio's conscience. Geppetto awakens upon hearing the commotion from Pinocchio falling, and is overjoyed to discover that he is alive and will become a real boy.

The next morning, while walking to school, Pinocchio is led astray by con artist Honest John the Fox and his sidekick Gideon the Cat. Honest John convinces him to join Stromboli's puppet show, despite Jiminy's protestations. Pinocchio becomes Stromboli's star attraction, but when he tries to go home, Stromboli locks him in a bird cage and leaves to tour the world with Pinocchio. After Jiminy unsuccessfully tries to free his friend, the Blue Fairy appears, and an anxious Pinocchio lies about what happened, causing his nose to grow and become a tree branch with a bird's nest. The Blue Fairy restores his nose and frees Pinocchio when he promises to make amends, but warns him that she can offer no further help.

Meanwhile, a mysterious Coachman hires Honest John to find disobedient and naughty boys for him to take to Pleasure Island, a notorious and infamous place. Honest John, despite the legal risks and the Coachman's implication of what happens to the boys, accepts the job out of fear, and finds Pinocchio, persuading him to take a vacation on Pleasure Island. On the way to the island, Pinocchio befriends Lampwick, a delinquent boy. At Pleasure Island, without rules or authority to enforce their activity, Pinocchio, Lampwick, and many other boys soon engage in vices such as vandalism, fighting, smoking and drinking. Jiminy eventually finds Pinocchio in a bar smoking and playing pool with Lampwick, and the two have a falling out after Pinocchio defends Lampwick for his actions. As Jiminy tries leaving Pleasure Island, he discovers that the island hides a horrible curse that transforms the boys into donkeys after making "jackasses" of themselves, and they are sold by the Coachman into slave labor. A terrified Pinocchio witnesses Lampwick transform into a donkey, and with Jiminy's help, he flees before he fully transforms, though he still grows a donkey's ears and tail.

Upon returning home, Pinocchio and Jiminy find Geppetto's workshop deserted, and obtain a letter from the Blue Fairy in the form of a dove, stating that Geppetto had set out to sea in search for Pinocchio on Pleasure Island, but got swallowed by a gigantic and vicious sperm whale called Monstro and is now trapped in its belly. Determined to rescue his father, Pinocchio jumps into the Mediterranean Sea with Jiminy and is soon swallowed by Monstro, where he reunites with Geppetto. Pinocchio devises a scheme to make Monstro sneeze and allow them to escape, but the whale chases them and destroys their raft with his tail. Pinocchio selflessly pulls Geppetto to safety in a cove just as Monstro crashes into it, and both the whale and Pinocchio are seemingly killed in the process.

Back at home, Geppetto, Jiminy, Figaro, and Cleo mourn the lifeless Pinocchio. However, having succeeded in proving himself brave, truthful, and unselfish, Pinocchio is revived and turned into a real human boy by the Blue Fairy, much to everyone's joy. As the group celebrates, Jiminy steps outside to thank the Fairy and is rewarded with a solid gold badge that certifies him as an official conscience.

== Voice cast ==
- Dickie Jones as Pinocchio, a wooden puppet carved by Geppetto and brought to life by the Blue Fairy.
  - Jones also voiced Alexander, a boy who is turned into a donkey at Pleasure Island, but still talks.
- Cliff Edwards as Jiminy Cricket, a cricket who acts as Pinocchio's "conscience" and is the partial narrator of the story.
- Christian Rub as Geppetto, an elderly wood-carver and Pinocchio's creator, who wishes for him to become a real boy.
- Clarence Nash as Figaro, Geppetto's pet cat who is prone to sulk. Cleo, Geppetto's pet goldfish with a habit of being Figaro's counselor, is unvoiced. Figaro and Cleo were original characters not present in the original story, and were added to the script by the Disney team. Nash also voices the rough house statue and makes the braying sounds for the donkeys on Pleasure Island, after the boys have been transformed into them.
- Walter Catlett as "Honest" John Worthington Foulfellow, an anthropomorphic red fox con artist who swindles Pinocchio.
- Mel Blanc as Gideon the Cat, Honest John's mute anthropomorphic feline partner and sidekick who serves as comic relief. He was originally intended to be voiced by Blanc, in his last work for Disney until his final work in Who Framed Roger Rabbit, but the filmmakers instead went with a mute performance for the character. However, Gideon's hiccups were provided by Blanc.
- Charles Judels as Stromboli, a puppeteer who buys Pinocchio for a miserable amount of money from Honest John and Gideon, and intends to force Pinocchio to perform onstage to make money and use as "firewood" once he gets "too old" to perform. He speaks English with an Italian accent, and curses in Italian gibberish when angry. He is called a "gypsy" by Honest John, likely due to his theatre and caravan always travelling, as well as other names like "rascal" and "faker".
  - Judels also voiced the Coachman, the owner and operator of Pleasure Island with a Cockney accent.
- Evelyn Venable as the Blue Fairy, who brings Pinocchio to life and promises to turn him into a real boy if he proves himself brave, truthful, and selfless. Live-action references for the Blue Fairy were provided by Marge Champion, who also served as the live-action reference for the titular heroine in Snow White and the Seven Dwarfs.
- Frankie Darro as Lampwick, a boy whom Pinocchio befriends on his way to Pleasure Island and is turned into a donkey for his mischief.
- Stuart Buchanan as the Carnival Barker, the announcer at Pleasure Island. In a book adaptation of the film, "Barker" is the Coachman's name or alias.
- Thurl Ravenscroft as Monstro, the sperm whale. He swallows Pinocchio, Geppetto, Figaro, and Cleo, then tries to kill them after they escape from his belly by making him sneeze.

== Production ==
=== Development ===
In September 1937, during the production of Snow White and the Seven Dwarfs, animator Norman Ferguson brought a translated version of Carlo Collodi's 1883 Italian children's novel The Adventures of Pinocchio to the attention of Walt Disney. After reading the book, "Walt was busting his guts with enthusiasm," as Ferguson later recalled. Disney then commissioned storyboard artist Bianca Majolie to write a new story outline for the book, but after reading it, he felt her outline was too faithful. Pinocchio was intended to be the studio's third feature, after Bambi (1942). However, due to difficulties with Bambi (adapting the story and animating the animals realistically), Disney announced that Bambi would be postponed while Pinocchio would move ahead in production. Ben Sharpsteen was then reassigned to supervise the production while Jack Kinney was given directional reins.

=== Writing and design ===
Unlike Snow White, which was a short story that the writers could expand and experiment with, Pinocchio was based on a novel with a very fixed, although episodic, story. Therefore, the story went through drastic changes before reaching its final incarnation. In the original novel, Pinocchio is a cold, rude, ungrateful, inhuman brat that often repels sympathy and only learns his lessons the hard way. The writers decided to modernize the character and depict him as similar to Edgar Bergen's dummy Charlie McCarthy, but just as rambunctious as the puppet in the book. The story was still being developed in the early stages of animation.

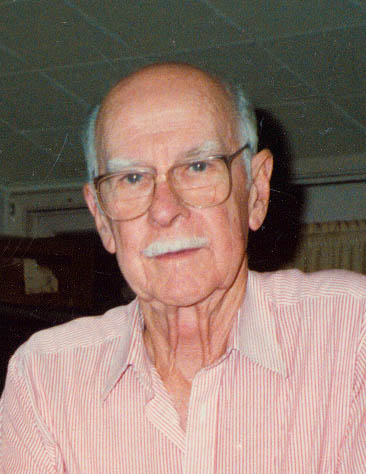
Ollie Johnston

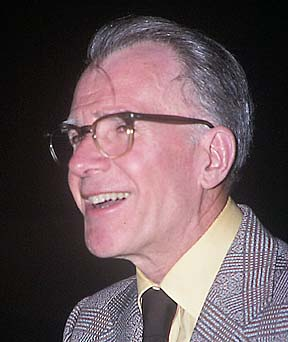
Frank Thomas

Early scenes animated by Ollie Johnston and Frank Thomas show that Pinocchio's design was exactly like that of a real wooden puppet with a long pointed nose, a peaked cap and bare wooden hands.

Early scenes animated by Frank Thomas and Ollie Johnston show that Pinocchio's design was exactly like a real wooden puppet with a long pointed nose, a peaked cap, and bare wooden hands. Disney, however, was not impressed with the work that was being done on the film. He felt that no one could really sympathize with such a character and called for an immediate halt in production. Fred Moore redesigned the character slightly to make him more appealing, but the design still retained a wooden feel.

Young and upcoming animator Milt Kahl felt that Thomas, Johnston, and Moore were "rather obsessed with the idea of this boy being a wooden puppet" and felt that they should "forget that he was a puppet and get a cute little boy; you can always draw the wooden joints and make him a wooden puppet afterwards." Co-supervising director Hamilton Luske suggested to Kahl that he should demonstrate his beliefs by animating a test sequence.

Kahl then showed Disney an animation test scene in which Pinocchio is underwater looking for his father. From this scene, Kahl re-envisioned the character by making him look more like a real boy, with a child's Tyrolean hat and standard cartoon character four-fingered (or three and a thumb) hands with Mickey Mouse-type gloves. The only parts of Pinocchio that still looked more or less like a puppet were his arms, legs, and little button wooden nose. Disney embraced Kahl's scene and immediately urged the writers to evolve Pinocchio into a more innocent, naïve, somewhat coy personality reflecting Kahl's design.

However, Disney discovered that the new Pinocchio was too helpless and was far too often led astray by deceiving characters. Therefore, in the summer of 1938, Disney and his story team established the character of the cricket. Originally, the talking cricket was only a minor character whom Pinocchio abruptly killed by squashing with a mallet and who later returned as a ghost. Disney dubbed the cricket "Jiminy", and made him a character who would try to guide Pinocchio into the right decisions. Once the character was expanded, he was depicted as a realistic cricket with toothed legs and waving antennae, but Disney wanted something more likable. Ward Kimball had spent several months animating two sequences—a soup-eating musical number and a bed-building sequence—in Snow White, which was cut from the film for pacing reasons. Kimball was about to quit when Disney rewarded him for his work by promoting him to the supervising animator of Jiminy Cricket. Kimball then conjured up the design for Jiminy Cricket, whom he described as a little man with an egg head and no ears. Jiminy "was a cricket because we called him a cricket," Kimball later joked.

=== Casting ===
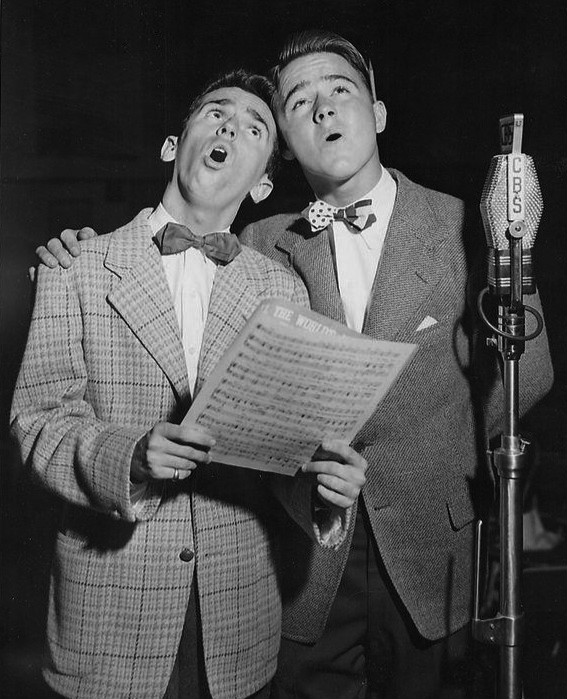
Dickie Jones (right, as a teenager) voices Pinocchio in the film.

Due to the huge success of Snow White, Walt Disney wanted more famous voices for Pinocchio, which marked the first time an animated film had used celebrities as voice actors. He cast popular singer Cliff Edwards, also known as "Ukulele Ike", as Jiminy Cricket. Disney rejected the idea of having an adult play Pinocchio and insisted that the character be voiced by a real child. He cast 12-year-old child actor Dickie Jones, who had previously been in Frank Capra's Mr. Smith Goes to Washington (1939). He also cast Frankie Darro as Lampwick, Walter Catlett as "Honest" John Foulfellow the Fox, Evelyn Venable as the Blue Fairy, Charles Judels as both the villainous Stromboli and the Coachman, and Christian Rub as Geppetto, whose design was already a caricature of Rub. Another actor voiced Geppetto originally, but Disney recast him with Rub after feeling that his voice was "too harsh".

Another voice actor recruited was Mel Blanc, best remembered for voicing many of the characters in Warner Bros. cartoon shorts, including Looney Tunes and Merrie Melodies. Blanc recorded the voice of Gideon the Cat in sixteen days. However, it was eventually decided that Gideon would be mute, so all of Blanc's recorded dialogue was subsequently deleted except for a solitary hiccup, which was heard three times in the finished film.

=== Animation ===
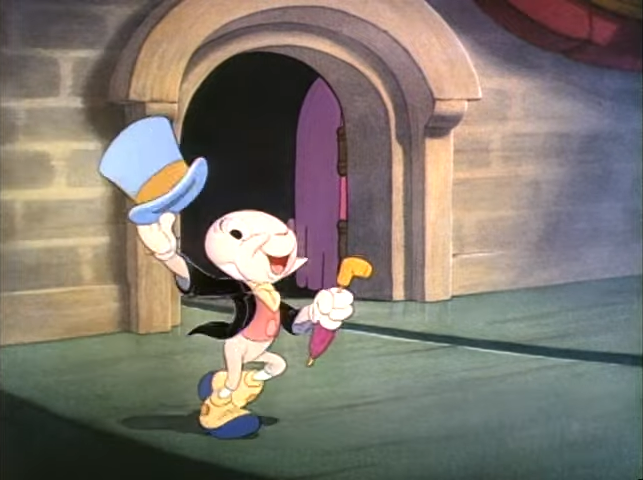
Jiminy Cricket

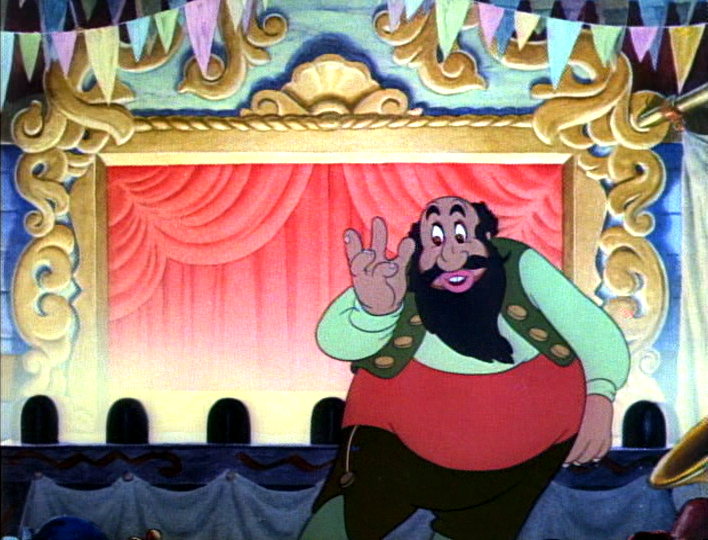
Stromboli, primarily animated by Bill Tytla

Animation on the film began in January 1938, but work on Pinocchio's animation was discontinued as the writers sought to re-work his characterization and the film's narrative structure. However, animation on the film's supporting characters started in April 1938. Animation would not resume again with the revised story until September.

During the production of the film, story artist Joe Grant formed a character model department, which would be responsible for building three-dimensional clay models of the characters in the film, known as maquettes. These models were then given to the staff to observe how a character should be drawn from any given angle desired by the artists. The model makers also built working models of Geppetto's elaborate cuckoo clocks designed by Albert Hurter, as well as Stromboli's gypsy wagon and wooden cage, and the Coachman's carriage. However, owing to the difficulty of animating a realistic moving vehicle, the artists filmed the carriage maquettes on a miniature set using stop motion animation. Then, each frame of the animation was transferred onto animation cels using an early version of a Xerox. The cels were then painted on the back and overlaid on top of background images with the cels of the characters to create the completed shot on the rostrum camera. Like Snow White, live-action footage was shot for Pinocchio with the actors playing the scenes in pantomime, supervised by Luske. Rather than tracing, which would result in stiff unnatural movement, the animators used the footage as a guide for animation by studying human movement and then incorporating some poses into the animation (though slightly exaggerated).

Pinocchio was a ground-breaking achievement in the area of effects animation, led by Joshua Meador. In contrast to the character animators who concentrate on the acting of the characters, effects animators create everything that moves other than the characters—vehicles, machinery, and natural effects such as rain, lightning, snow, smoke, shadows and water, as well as the fantasy or science-fiction type effects like the pixie dust of Peter Pan (1953). The influential abstract animator Oskar Fischinger, who mainly worked on Fantasia (1940), contributed to the effects animation of the Blue Fairy's wand. Effects animator Sandy Strother kept a diary about his year-long animation of the water effects, which included splashes, ripples, bubbles, waves, and the illusion of being underwater. To help give depth to the ocean, the animators put more detail into the waves on the water surface in the foreground, and put in less detail as the surface moved further back. After the animation was traced onto cels, the assistant animators would trace it once more with blue and black pencil leads to give the waves a sculptured look. To save time and money, the splashes were kept impressionistic. These techniques enabled Pinocchio to be one of the first animated films to have highly realistic effects animation. Ollie Johnston called it "one of the finest things the studio's ever done, as Frank Thomas said, 'The water looks so real a person can drown in it, and they do.'"

== Music ==
The songs in Pinocchio were composed by Leigh Harline with lyrics by Ned Washington. Harline and Paul J. Smith composed the incidental music score. The climactic Whale Chase was co-composed by Edward H. Plumb. The soundtrack was first released on February 9, 1940. Jiminy Cricket's song, "When You Wish Upon A Star", became a major hit and is still identified with the film, and later as the theme song of The Walt Disney Company itself. The soundtrack won an Academy Award for Best Original Score.

== Themes ==
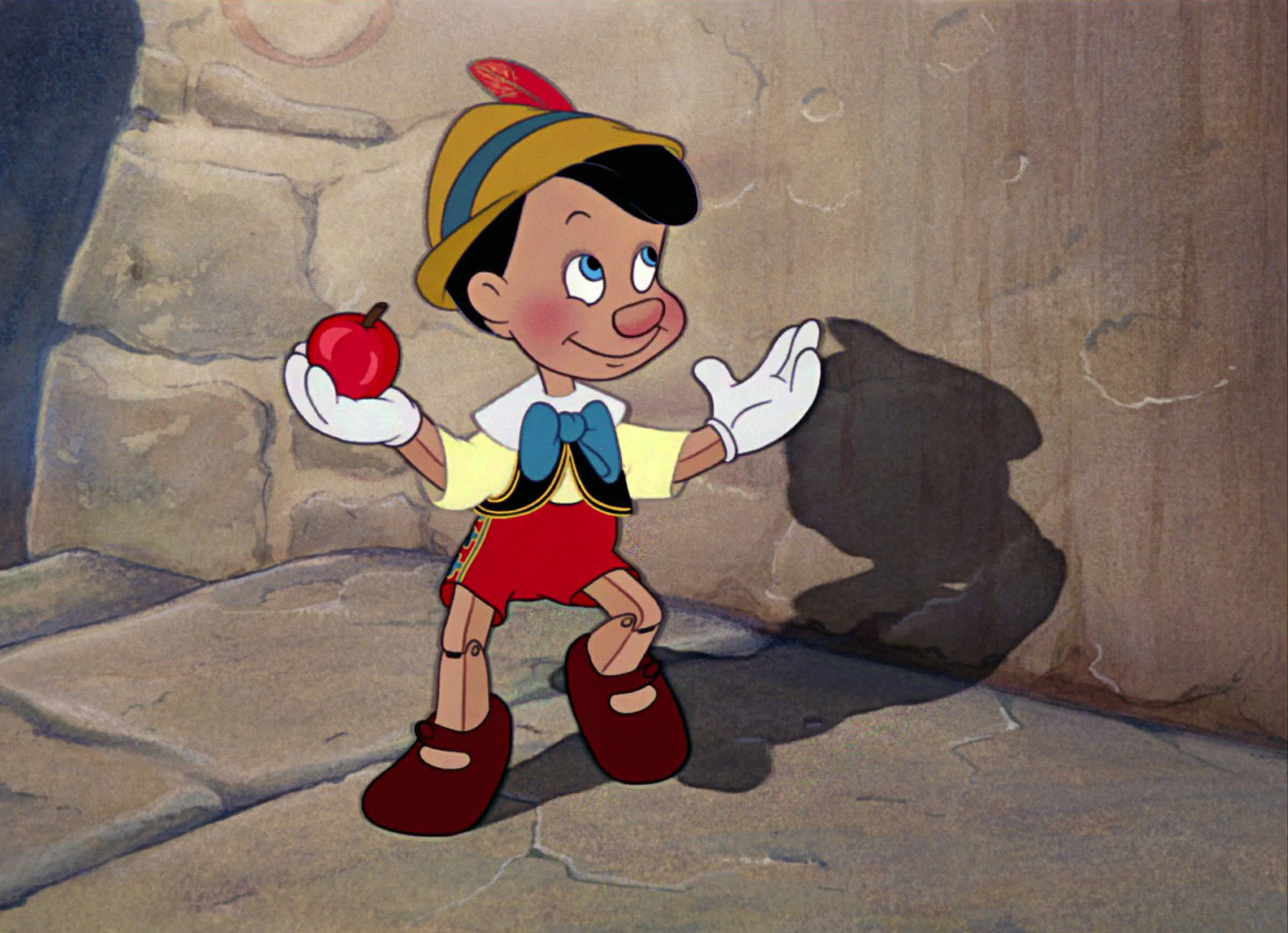
Commentator Nicholas Sammond considers Pinocchio to be a metaphor for American child-rearing in the mid-20th century.

M. Keith Booker considers the film to be the most down-to-earth of the Disney animated films despite its theme song and magic, noting that the film's protagonist has to work to prove his worth, which he remarked seemed "more in line with the ethos of capitalism" than most of the Disney films. Claudia Mitchell and Jacqueline Reid-Walsh believe that the male protagonists of films like Pinocchio and Bambi (1942) were purposefully constructed by Disney to appeal to both boys and girls. Mark I. Pinsky said that it is "a simple morality tale—cautionary and schematic—ideal for moral instruction, save for some of its darker moments" and noted that the film is a favorite of parents of young children.

Nicolas Sammond argues that the film is "an apt metaphor for the metaphysics of midcentury American child-rearing" and is "ultimately an assimilationist fable". He considered it to be the central Disney film and the most strongly middle class, intended to relay the message that indulging in "the pleasures of the working class, of vaudeville, or of pool halls and amusement parks, led to a life as a beast of burden". For Sammond, the purpose of Pinocchio is to help convey to children the "middle-class virtues of deferred gratification, self-denial, thrift, and perseverance, naturalized as the experience of the most average American".

Author and illustrator Maurice Sendak, who saw the film in theaters in 1940, called it superior to Collodi's novel in its depiction of children and growing up. "The Pinocchio in the film is not the unruly, sulking, vicious, devious (albeit still charming) marionette that Collodi created. Neither is he an innately evil, doomed-to-calamity child of sin. He is, rather, both lovable and loved. Therein lies Disney's triumph. His Pinocchio is a mischievous, innocent, and very naive little wooden boy. What makes our anxiety over his fate endurable is a reassuring sense that Pinocchio is loved for himself – and not for what he should or shouldn't be. Disney has corrected a terrible wrong. Pinocchio, he says, is good; his 'badness' is only a matter of inexperience," and also that "Pinocchio's wish to be a real boy remains the film's underlying theme, but 'becoming a real boy' now signifies the wish to grow up, not the wish to be good."

Canadian psychologist Jordan Peterson has spoken about the film extensively in his lectures, citing it as an example of "the manner in which great mythological and archetypal themes inform and permeate narrative".

== Home media ==
On July 16, 1985, it was released on VHS, Betamax, CED, and LaserDisc in North America for the first time as part of the Walt Disney Classics label, the second title with the Classics label after Robin Hood (1973) which was released the previous December. It would become the best-selling home video title of the year selling 130–150,000 units at $80 each. It was re-issued on October 14, 1986 to advertise the home video debut of Sleeping Beauty (1959), this release also helped leave out the preview of The Black Cauldron from the original 1985 VHS release due to the preview being too dark and scary for kids. Then, for the first time, it was released on VHS in the UK in 1988, 1995, and 2000. The digital restoration that was completed for the 1992 cinema re-issue was released on VHS and Laserdisc on March 26, 1993 and sold 13.5 million copies. Its fourth VHS release and first release on Disney DVD was the 60th Anniversary Edition released on October 26, 1999. For this version, both releases would now be THX certified.

The film was re-issued on DVD and one final time on VHS as part of the Walt Disney Gold Classic Collection release on March 7, 2000. Along the film, the VHS edition also contained a making-of documentary while the DVD had the film's original theatrical trailer as supplemental features. The Gold Classic Collection release was returned to the Disney Vault on January 31, 2002.

A special edition VHS and DVD of the film was released in the United Kingdom on March 3, 2003. The fourth DVD release and first Blu-ray Disc release (the second Blu-ray in the Walt Disney Platinum Editions series) was the 70th Anniversary Edition released on March 10, 2009. Like the 2008 Sleeping Beauty Blu-ray release, the Pinocchio Blu-ray package featured a new restoration by Lowry Digital in a two-disc Blu-ray set, with a bonus DVD version of the film also included. This set returned to the Disney Vault on April 30, 2011. A Signature Edition was released on Digital HD on January 10, 2017 and was followed by a Blu-ray/DVD combo pack on January 31, 2017.

== Reception ==
=== Initial release ===
The film's 1940 theatrical trailer.

Upon its release, Pinocchio received widespread critical acclaim. Frank S. Nugent of The New York Times gave the film five out of five stars, saying "Pinocchio is here at last, is every bit as fine as we had prayed it would be—if not finer—and ... it is as gay and clever and delightful a fantasy as any well-behaved youngster or jaded oldster could hope to see." Time magazine gave the film a positive review, stating "In craftsmanship and delicacy of drawing and coloring, in the articulation of its dozens of characters, in the greater variety and depth of its photographic effects, it tops the high standard Snow White set. The charm, humor and loving care with which it treats its inanimate characters puts it in a class by itself."

Variety praised the animation as superior to Snow White's writing the "[a]nimation is so smooth that cartoon figures carry impression of real persons and settings rather than drawings to onlooker." In summary, they felt Pinocchio "will stand on [its] own as a substantial piece of entertainment for young and old, providing attention through its perfection in animation and photographic effects. The Hollywood Reporter wrote "Pinocchio is entertainment for every one of every age, so completely charming and delightful that there is profound regret when it reaches the final fade-out. Since comparisons will be inevitable, it may as well be said at once that, from a technical standpoint, conception and production, this picture is infinitely superior to Snow White."

=== Box office ===
At first, Pinocchio was not a box-office success. The box office returns from the film's initial release were both below Snow White's unprecedented success and below studio expectations. Of the film's $2.6 million negative cost—twice the cost of Snow White—Disney only recouped $1 million by late 1940, with studio reports of the film's final original box office take varying between $1.4 million and $1.9 million. Animation historian Michael Barrier notes that Pinocchio returned rentals of less than one million by September 1940, and in its first public annual report, Walt Disney Productions charged off a $1 million loss to the film. Barrier relays that a 1947 Pinocchio balance sheet listed total receipts to the studio of $1.4 million. This was primarily due to the fact that World War II and its aftermath had cut off the European and Asian markets overseas, and hindered the international success of Pinocchio and other Disney releases during the early and mid-1940s. Joe Grant recalled Walt Disney being "very, very depressed" about Pinocchio's initial returns at the box office. The distributor RKO recorded a loss of $94,000 for the film from worldwide rentals of $3,238,000.

=== Accolades ===
The film was nominated and won two Academy Awards in 1940 for Best Original Score and Best Original Song (for "When You Wish Upon a Star"), the first Disney film to win either category.
To date, only six other Disney films have made this achievement: Mary Poppins (1964), The Little Mermaid (1989), Beauty and the Beast (1991), Aladdin (1992), The Lion King (1994), and Pocahontas (1995).

| Award | Category | Nominee(s) | Result | Ref. |
|---|---|---|---|---|
| Academy Awards | Best Original Score | Leigh Harline, Paul Smith, and Ned Washington | Won | |
| Academy Awards | Best Original Song | "When You Wish Upon a Star"; Music by Leigh Harline; Lyrics by Ned Washington | Won | |
| ASCAP Film and Television Music Awards | Most Performed Feature Film Standards | "When You Wish Upon a Star"; Leigh Harline and Ned Washington | Won | |
| Hugo Awards | Best Dramatic Presentation – Short Form | Ted Sears, Ben Sharpsteen, and Hamilton Luske | Won | |
| National Film Preservation Board | National Film Registry | | Inducted | |
| Online Film & Television Association Awards | Film Hall of Fame: Productions | | Inducted | |
| Online Film & Television Association Awards | Film Hall of Fame: Songs | "When You Wish Upon a Star" | Inducted | |

=== Reissues ===
With the re-release of Snow White and the Seven Dwarfs in 1944 came the tradition of re-releasing Disney films every seven to ten years. Pinocchio was theatrically re-released in 1945, 1954, 1962, 1971, 1978, 1984, and 1992. RKO handled the first two reissues in 1945 and 1954, while Disney itself reissued the film from 1962 on through its Buena Vista Distribution division. The 1992 re-issue was digitally restored by cleaning and removing scratches from the original negatives one frame at a time, eliminating soundtrack distortions, and revitalizing the color.

Despite its initial struggles at the box office, a series of reissues in the years after World War II proved more successful and allowed the film to turn a profit. By 1973, the film had earned rentals of $13 million in the United States and Canada from the initial 1940 release and four reissues. After the 1978 reissue, the rentals had increased to $19.9 million from a total gross of $39 million. The 1984 reissue grossed $26.4 million in the U.S. and Canada, bringing its total gross there to $65.4 million and $145 million worldwide. The 1992 reissue grossed $18.9 million in the U.S. and Canada bringing Pinocchio's lifetime gross to $84.3 million at the U.S. and Canadian box office.

=== Modern acclaim ===
On the review aggregator website Rotten Tomatoes, the film has a rating of 100% based on 61 reviews, with an average rating of 9.3/10. The general consensus of the film on the site reads, "Ambitious, adventurous, and sometimes frightening, Pinocchio arguably represents the pinnacle of Disney's collected works – it's beautifully crafted and emotionally resonant." Metacritic, which uses a weighted average, assigned the film a score of 99 out of 100, based on 17 critics, indicating "universal acclaim". It is currently the highest-rated animated film on the site, as well as the highest-rated Disney animated film.

Many film historians consider this to be the film that most closely approaches technical perfection of all the Disney animated features. Film critic Leonard Maltin said, "with Pinocchio, Disney reached not only the height of his powers, but the apex of what many critics consider to be the realm of the animated cartoon."

Roger Ebert of the Chicago Sun-Times awarded the film 4 stars out of 4, and said, "Pinocchio" is a parable for children, and generations have grown up remembering the words "Let your conscience be your guide" and "A lie keeps growing and growing until it's as plain as the nose on your face." The power of the film is generated, I think, because it is really about something. It isn't just a concocted fable or a silly fairy tale, but a narrative with deep archetypal reverberations." Alan Morrison of Empire Magazine gave the film 4 stars out of 5 and said, "Not up there with the very top echelon of Disney classics, but Pinocchio will still work its magic on younger viewers."

In 1994, Pinocchio was added to the United States National Film Registry as being deemed "culturally, historically, or aesthetically significant". Filmmaker Terry Gilliam selected it as one of the ten best animated films of all time in a 2001 article written for The Guardian and in 2005, Time magazine named it one of the 100 best films of the last 80 years, and then in June 2011 named it the best animated movie of "The 25 All-TIME Best Animated Films".

In June 2008, the American Film Institute revealed its "Ten top Ten"—the best ten films in ten "classic" American film genres—after polling over 1,500 people from the creative community. Pinocchio was acknowledged as the second best film in the medium of animation, after Snow White. It was nominated for the AFI's 100 Years...100 Movies, and received further nominations for their Thrills and Heroes and Villains (Stromboli in the villains category) lists. The song "When You Wish Upon A Star" ranked number 7 on their 100 Songs list, and the film ranked 38th in the 100 Cheers list. The quote "A lie keeps growing and growing until it's as plain as the nose on your face" was nominated for the Movie Quotes list, and the film received further nomination in the AFI's Greatest Movie Musicals list.

On June 29, 2018, Pinocchio was named the 13th best Disney animated film by IGN. Film critic Roger Ebert, adding it to his list of "Great Movies", wrote that the movie "isn't just a concocted fable or a silly fairy tale, but a narrative with deep archetypal reverberations." In November 2024, IndieWire listed it first in its ranking of every Walt Disney Animation Studios film. Writer Christian Blauvelt elaborated: "This is not a film you'll ever fully wrap your head around, never 'solve', never stop finding things to wonder at. It's a singular work of depth and ambition, the kind that all artists would aspire to from the core of their being."

== Legacy ==
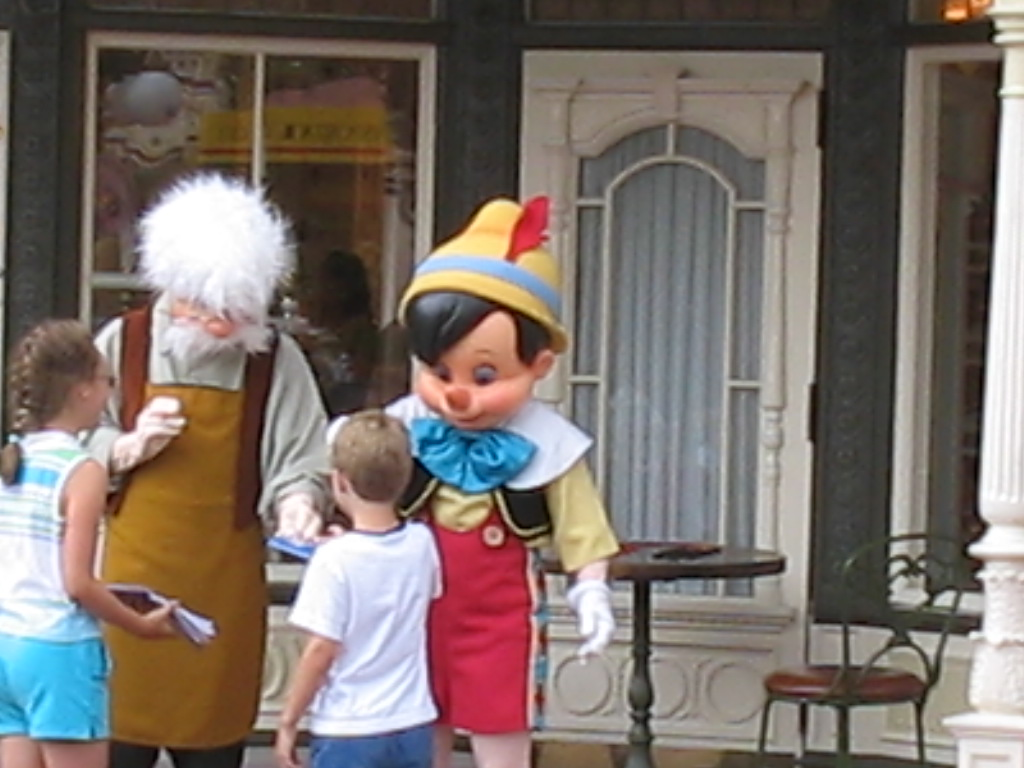
Geppetto and Pinocchio at Magic Kingdom

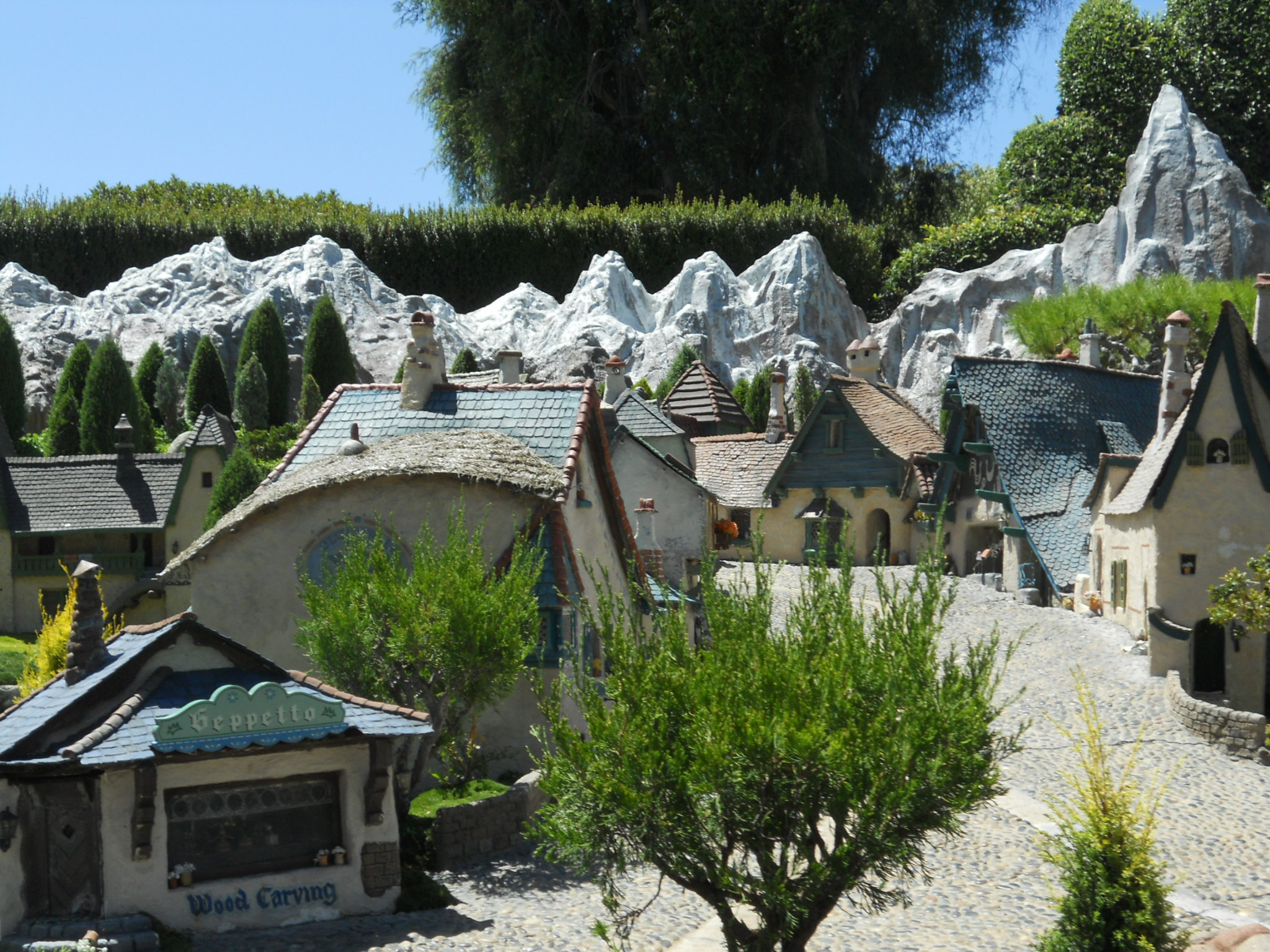
Pinocchio's village, Disneyland, inspired by Gustaf Tenggren paintings

After the film, Jiminy Cricket became an iconic Disney character, making numerous other appearances in a major role, including the film Fun and Fancy Free (1947), educational serials from The Mickey Mouse Club (1955–1977), the featurette Mickey's Christmas Carol (1983), and the video game Disney's Villains' Revenge (1999).

Figaro, Geppetto's kitten, primarily animated by Eric Larson, has been described as a "hit with the audiences", which resulted in him making appearances in several subsequent Disney short films in the 1940s. He continues to appear in multiple media, mostly as the pet of Minnie Mouse.

The Blue Fairy is the main character in the prequel novel When You Wish Upon a Star which is mostly set 40 years prior to the events of the film. It was written by Elizabeth Lim and published on April 4, 2023 as part of Disney's A Twisted Tale anthology series. The story details her origins as Chiara Belmagio, a baker's eldest daughter and philanthropist in the small Italian town of Pariva, her complex relationship with her narcissistic younger sister Ilaria and her eventual transformation into a fairy.

Many of Pinocchio's characters are costumed characters at Disney parks. Pinocchio's Daring Journey is a popular ride at the original Disneyland, Tokyo Disneyland, and Disneyland Park in Paris. Pinocchio Village Haus is a quick service restaurant at Walt Disney World that serves pizza and macaroni and cheese. There are similar quick-service restaurants at the Disneyland parks in Anaheim and Paris as well, with almost identical names.

Disney on Ice starring Pinocchio, toured internationally from 1987 to 1992. A shorter version of the story is also presented in the current Disney on Ice production "One Hundred Years of Magic".

Pinocchio, Geppetto, Jiminy Cricket and the Blue Fairy appear in Once Upon a Time, played by Eion Bailey, Jakob Davies, Tony Amendola, Raphael Sbarge, and Keegan Connor Tracy, respectively.

Like other Walt Disney Animation Studios characters, the characters from Pinocchio have cameo appearances in the short film Once Upon a Studio (2023).

=== Cancelled sequel ===
In the mid-2000s, Disneytoon Studios began development on a direct-to-video sequel to Pinocchio. Robert Reece co-wrote the film's screenplay, which saw Pinocchio on a "strange journey" for the sake of something dear to him. "It's a story that leads Pinocchio to question why life appears unfair sometimes," said Reece. John Lasseter cancelled Pinocchio II soon after being named Chief Creative Officer of Walt Disney Animation Studios in 2006.

=== Live-action adaptations ===
==== Geppetto ====
A Disney television movie titled Geppetto was released in 2000 that retold the original 1883 Pinocchio book from Geppetto's perspective. A few elements from the 1940 animated film were incorporated, such as the character of Figaro, the song "I've Got No Strings", and Pleasure Island. It stars Drew Carey as Geppetto and Seth Adkins as Pinocchio, and features music and lyrics by Stephen Schwartz.

The movie was in turn adapted into a musical, Disney's My Son Pinocchio: Geppetto's Musical Tale, which premiered at The Coterie Theatre, Kansas City, Missouri in 2006.

==== 2022 remake ====
A live-action adaptation directed by Robert Zemeckis who also co-produced and co-written with Chris Weitz, and stars Tom Hanks as Geppetto, Benjamin Evan Ainsworth as Pinocchio, Joseph Gordon-Levitt as Jiminy Cricket, Cynthia Erivo as the Blue Fairy, Keegan-Michael Key as Honest John, Luke Evans as the Coachman and Lorraine Bracco as a new character named Sofia the Seagull. The film was released to the streaming service Disney+ on September 8, 2022.

== In other media ==
=== Comics ===
The Silly Symphony Sunday comic strip published an adaptation of Pinocchio from December 24, 1939 to April 7, 1940. The sequences were scripted by Merrill De Maris and drawn by Hank Porter.

=== Video games ===
Aside from the Sega Genesis/Mega Drive, Game Boy, and SNES games based on the animated film, characters from Pinocchio appear in several Disney video games.

Jiminy Cricket acts as the player's guide in Disney's Villains' Revenge.

In the Kingdom Hearts series, Jiminy Cricket accompanies Sora and records player progress and game events in his journal for Kingdom Hearts, Kingdom Hearts: Chain of Memories, Kingdom Hearts II, and Kingdom Hearts III. Pinocchio, Geppetto, Cleo, and Monstro also appear as characters in Kingdom Hearts and the inside of Monstro is featured as one of the worlds. Pinocchio's home world was slated to appear in Kingdom Hearts 358/2 Days, but was omitted due to time restrictions, although talk-sprites of Pinocchio, Geppetto, Honest John and Gideon have been revealed. This world did appear in Kingdom Hearts 3D: Dream Drop Distance under the name "Prankster's Paradise", with Dream world versions of Pinocchio, Jiminy Cricket, Geppetto, Monstro and the Blue Fairy appearing.

Pinocchio, Jiminy Cricket, Geppetto, Figaro, the Blue Fairy, Honest John and Stromboli appear as playable characters in the video game Disney Magic Kingdoms, along with some attractions based on locations in the film. Monstro also appears as a Boss Battle during the limited time "Pinocchio Event", in which the characters and material related to the film were included. In the game, the characters are involved in new storylines that serve as a continuation of the film.

== See also ==
- 1940 in film
- List of American films of 1940
- List of Walt Disney Pictures films
- List of Disney theatrical animated feature films
- List of animated feature films of the 1940s
- List of highest-grossing animated films
- List of Disney animated films based on fairy tales
- List of films with a 100% rating on Rotten Tomatoes, a film review aggregator website
- List of films voted the best

== Bibliography ==
- Barrier, Michael (1999). Hollywood Cartoons : American Animation in Its Golden Age: American Animation in Its Golden Age. Oxford University Press. ISBN 978-0-19-802079-0.
- Barrier, Michael (2008). The Animated Man: A Life of Walt Disney. University of California Press. ISBN 978-0-52-025619-4.
- Beck, Jerry (2005). The Animated Movie Guide. Chicago Review Press. ISBN 978-1-56976-222-6.
- Booker, M. Keith (2010). Disney, Pixar, and the Hidden Messages of Children's Films. ABC-CLIO. ISBN 978-0-313-37672-6.
- Canemaker, John (2001). Walt Disney's Nine Old Men and the Art of Animation. Disney Editions. ISBN 978-0786864966.
- Gabler, Neal (2006). Walt Disney: The Triumph of the American Imagination. Vintage Books. ISBN 978-0-679-75747-4.
- Honeyman, Susan (2013). Consuming Agency in Fairy Tales, Childlore, and Folkliterature. Routledge. ISBN 978-1-136-60395-2.
- Mitchell, Claudia; Reid-Walsh, Jacqueline (2008). Girl Culture: Studying girl culture : a readers' guide. ABC-CLIO. ISBN 978-0-313-33909-7.
- Moritz, William (2004). Optical Poetry: The Life and Work of Oskar Fischinger. Indiana University Press. ISBN 0-253-34348-8.
- Pinsky, Mark I. (2004). "4". The Gospel According to Disney: Faith, Trust, and Pixie Dust. Westminster John Knox Press. ISBN 978-0-664-23467-6.
- Roberts, David (2006). British Hit Singles and Albums. Guinness World Records Limited. ISBN 978-1-904994-10-7.
- Thomas, Bob (1994) [1976]. Walt Disney: An American Original. New York: Hyperion. ISBN 978-0-7857-5515-9.
- Wasko, Janet (2013). Understanding Disney: The Manufacture of Fantasy. John Wiley & Sons. ISBN 978-0-7456-6904-5.
- Williams, Pat; Denney, James (2004). How to Be Like Walt: Capturing the Disney Magic Every Day of Your Life. Health Communications Inc. ISBN 978-0-7573-0231-2.
