= Disney's My Son Pinocchio: Geppetto's Musical Tale =

Musical

- Original logo
- Music: Stephen Schwartz
- Lyrics: Stephen Schwartz
- Book: David Stern
- Basis: 2000 made-for-television movie Geppetto

Disney's My Son Pinocchio: Geppetto's Musical Tale is a musical based on Disney's 2000 made-for-television movie Geppetto. Gepetto was written by David Stern, and Stern also wrote the book for the musical, with music and lyrics by Stephen Schwartz. As in the TV film, when Pinocchio runs away to become a star in Stromboli's puppet show, Geppetto must negotiate through a maze of adventures and comic encounters to find him.

The musical premiered under its former name, Disney's Geppetto & Son, at The Coterie Theatre, Kansas City, Missouri in 2006.

== Background ==
David Stern and Stephen Schwartz completed the made-for-TV film Disney's Geppetto in 2000. Several years later, the idea for a child-appropriate stage musical adaptation came up. Schwartz said in production notes for Disney's Geppetto & Son that he believes that the show "is entertaining while at the same time dealing with such important themes as individuality, self-esteem and the relation of parents and children. I am pleased that the Coterie Theatre feels this is an important work. I have written several other shows and films that I believe have had a positive impact on young audiences, such as Disney's Pocahontas, Godspell, Children of Eden, and the current Broadway show Wicked. I believe Disney's Geppetto & Son is a strong addition to this group." MTI currently licenses the show to groups, in addition to creating a Junior version of the show to be performed by children.

== Synopsis ==
=== Act 1 ===
The Blue Fairy greets the audience and explains that they will celebrate the story of one of her perfectly granted wishes — bringing Pinocchio to life at the request of his creator, Geppetto ("When You Wish Upon a Star"). However, Geppetto arrives and asks the Fairy to take Pinocchio back, explaining that he is defective. The Fairy, outraged at this request, takes Geppetto back in time to learn the truth. They arrive at Geppetto's toy shop the morning before the wish was made where Geppetto encounters a stream of children eager to buy his new toys ("Toys"). He is saddened because he is not a father since all the other parents have children. Once the children have gone home for the night, he puts the finishing touches on Pinocchio and wishes for his heart to be filled ("Empty Heart"). After he goes to sleep, the Blue Fairy appears and brings Pinocchio to life, telling him to prove himself brave, truthful, and unselfish, and someday, he will become a real boy.

Geppetto insists that Pinocchio was not a success at all, and the Fairy jumps ahead in time to learn more of the story ("Rise and Shine"). Geppetto teaches Pinocchio a song ("Geppetto and Son"), and a series of flashbacks are shown. After the flashbacks, they meet an unsuccessful puppeteer named Stromboli who immediately becomes interested in Pinocchio, thinking he would be worth a fortune to him in his puppet show, but the Blue Fairy frightens Stromboli away. Pinocchio becomes upset upon overhearing Geppetto telling the Fairy that he does not want him and runs away. The Fairy informs Geppetto that the problem is not Pinocchio; it is Geppetto himself. He angrily dismisses her, but she assures that these things have a way of working themselves out ("When You Wish Upon a Star (Reprise)").

Geppetto returns home later that night to apologize to Pinocchio, only to find a note from him, stating he is going to sing and dance in Stromboli's puppet show. Geppetto convinces himself that Pinocchio will be happier living with Stromboli. Pinocchio performs with Stromboli's marionettes ("I've Got No Strings"). The performance is a success, but Stromboli is abusive toward Pinocchio. Geppetto arrives after the show, hoping to say goodbye, but Stromboli says Pinocchio left. Pinocchio escapes and Stromboli rages among his marionettes and vows to recapture Pinocchio ("Bravo Stromboli"). Meanwhile, as Geppetto searches for Pinocchio, he meets up again with the Blue Fairy, who observes that Geppetto does seem to care for Pinocchio after all. Geppetto denies this, and the Fairy finally agrees to take Pinocchio back if Geppetto can find him. Geppetto demands that the Fairy use her magic to find Pinocchio, but she demurs, explaining that magic is not the answer to everything ("Just Because It's Magic").

=== Act 2 ===
After intermission, the Blue Fairy expresses aloud her regret at having granted a wish to a moron. Geppetto overhears this and the two argue until they are interrupted by a pair of well-behaved children, whom Geppetto is immediately impressed with. The children introduce Geppetto and the Fairy to a couple who are waiting to see Professor Buonragazzo and his son, who make perfect children that will always be obedient to their parents. The professor makes the couple a daughter, and offers a number of other children as replacements for Pinocchio ("Satisfaction Guaranteed"), but a horrified Geppetto rejects them and runs away to find Pinocchio.

Geppetto and the Blue Fairy meet a series of talking animals who are something they are not, due to the misguided expectations of their parents. Geppetto reflects that parents should allow their children to grow up to be themselves. The Fairy interjects to secretly inform us that she is responsible for the talking animals. After Geppetto leaves, Stromboli arrives, wishing he had Pinocchio back. The Fairy notes that at least Stromboli wants Pinocchio, unlike Geppetto. She tells Stromboli to leave and she will bring Pinocchio to him. ("Bravo Stromboli - Reprise").

A ringmaster and his roustabouts welcomes Pinocchio and other runaway boys to Pleasure Island ("Pleasure Island") and they all have fun, creating chaos everywhere they go. Geppetto arrives to take Pinocchio home, but Pinocchio accuses Geppetto of not wanting him. He states that Pleasure Island is his new home. At that moment, Pinocchio and the other delinquents turn into donkeys. The Ringmaster orders them hauled away and Geppetto pursues a ship containing the transformed Pinocchio and the other donkeys leaving Pleasure Island ("Pleasure Island (Reprise)").

A huge whale swallows Geppetto and his rowboat whole. Inside the whale, Pinocchio explains that when he jumped in the water to save Geppetto after he got swallowed by the whale, the donkey curse washed away and he became a puppet again. Geppetto promises Pinocchio that their relationship will be different from now on ("Geppetto and Son (Whale Reprise)"). They get out of the whale when Pinocchio has Geppetto make him tell as many lies as he can, causing his nose to grow so it can tickle the whale's uvula to get it to throw them up. They return to the toy shop, only to find Stromboli and the Blue Fairy waiting for them. Geppetto offers Stromboli his whole workshop in exchange for letting him keep Pinocchio ("Since I Gave My Heart Away"). Stromboli refuses to cooperate, but the Fairy intercedes, transforming Pinocchio into a real boy, and therefore rendering him worthless to Stromboli. The Blue Fairy, satisfied that Geppetto and Pinocchio are now a real father and a real son, notes that her perfect wish record is still intact.

== Musical Numbers ==
The majority of the songs in this musical are from the movie soundtrack, but the musical does add a few new songs.

Act 1

- "When You Wish Upon a Star" (from the motion picture Disney's Pinocchio, with rights arranged for My Son Pinocchio) - Blue Fairy
- "Toys" - Townspeople, Geppetto
- "Empty Heart" - Geppetto
- "Rise and Shine" - Automatons
- "Geppetto and Son" - Geppetto, Pinocchio
- "When You Wish Upon a Star (Reprise)" - Blue Fairy
- "I've Got No Strings" - Pinocchio, Stromboli (also based on the motion picture Pinocchio)
- "Bravo Stromboli" - Stromboli
- "Just Because It's Magic" - Blue Fairy, Geppetto

Act 2

- "Satisfaction Guaranteed" - Professor Buonragazzo, residents of Idylia
- "Bravo Stromboli (Reprise)" - Stromboli
- "Pleasure Island" - Pleasure Island Ringmaster, Roustabouts, Delinquents
- "Pleasure Island (Reprise)" - Pleasure Island Ringmaster
- "Geppetto and Son (Whale Reprise)" - Pinocchio, Geppetto
- "Since I Gave My Heart Away" - Geppetto
- "Since I Gave My Heart Away/When You Wish Upon a Star (Finale)" - Company
