= Funky Monkey =

Funky Monkey may refer to:

- "Funky Monkey", an episode of Class of 3000, an animated series
- Funky Monkey (film), a 2004 film starring Matthew Modine and Roma Downey
