= Public Academy for Performing Arts =

High School in Albuquerque, New Mexico

Coordinates: 35°7′6.0″N 106°35′37.2″W

- 11800 Princess Jeanne Ave NE; Albuquerque, New Mexico, United States

Information
- Type: Charter, Grades 6-12
- Established: 2001
- Principal: Tamara 'Gregory' Lopez
- Faculty: 40
- Enrollment: 425
- Website: https://www.paparts.org

The Public Academy for Performing Arts (PAPA) is a charter school located in Albuquerque, New Mexico. PAPA serves students from grades six to twelve.

== History ==
A handful of Albuquerque locals put together a proposal for creating a performing arts schools in 2000. The Albuquerque Public Schools accepted the plan to create the charter school, the Public Academy for Performing Arts (PAPA), on November 15, 2000. PAPA began teaching students in August 2001. It was the inaugural charter school centered on the performing arts in New Mexico. In its first year, it served 180 students between the sixth and ninth grades. In 2022, it taught 450 students between the sixth and 12th grades. The school offers ballet, jazz, flamenco, hip-hop, and contemporary dance, choir, band, orchestra and theater courses.

== Notable alumni ==
- Seth Adkins, actor
