= Geppetto (film) =

2000 American film

- 2009 DVD cover for Geppetto
- Genre: Musical fantasy
- Based on: The Adventures of Pinocchio by Carlo Collodi
- Written by: David I. Stern
- Directed by: Tom Moore
- Starring: Drew Carey; Julia Louis-Dreyfus; Brent Spiner; René Auberjonois; Seth Adkins; Usher
- Narrated by: Drew Carey
- Music by: Stephen Schwartz
- Country of origin: United States
- Original language: English

Production
- Producer: Ted Zachary
- Cinematography: Stephen M. Katz
- Editor: Virginia Katz
- Running time: 89 minutes
- Production companies: James Pentecost Productions; Karz Entertainment; Walt Disney Television
- Budget: $12.5 million

Original release
- Network: ABC
- Release: May 7, 2000

Geppetto is a 2000 American television musical film based on the popular 1883 Italian children's book The Adventures of Pinocchio by Carlo Collodi starring Drew Carey and Julia Louis-Dreyfus. The film, which retells the story from the perspective of the titular character Geppetto, features some elements of the 1940 animated film such as the character of Figaro, the song "I've Got No Strings", as well as Pleasure Island. It features original songs written by Stephen Schwartz. Disney originally planned to reunite Dick Van Dyke and Julie Andrews in the roles of Geppetto and the Blue Fairy, respectively. However, Andrews declined the role following surgery on her vocal cords, and the proposed reunion was abandoned.

== Plot ==
Geppetto is a kind toymaker who desperately wishes to become a father. One night, after selling his new spring toys to the children of Villagio, his wish is granted by the Blue Fairy, who brings his wooden puppet, Pinocchio, to life with her magic saying that someday, if he proves himself brave, truthful and unselfish, he will become a real boy.

At first, Geppetto is delighted to have his wish come true, but runs into a string of problems, such as Pinocchio asking unnecessary questions when trying to get to sleep, getting into mischief and wandering off when introducing him to the townspeople, and showing no interest in being a toymaker. The next day, Geppetto sends Pinocchio off to school, telling him to just act like all the other children and he will do fine. However, Pinocchio gets into a fight at school, in which he was imitating all the other children. A disappointed Geppetto takes him home where an unsuccessful puppeteer named Stromboli becomes interested, thinking he would make him a fortune in his puppet shows. Still furious about Pinocchio's behavior, Geppetto tries to reason with the Blue Fairy, but she does not believe him. He returns home to apologize to Pinocchio, only to find out he ran away to live with Stromboli. Geppetto decides to say goodbye to Pinocchio by watching him perform in Stromboli's puppet show.

Stromboli is pleased with Pinocchio as his star puppet which has made him much money. But when Pinocchio asks to let him go, Stromboli refuses, stating it would violate a contract they signed. When Geppetto arrives backstage, hoping to say goodbye, Stromboli explains that Pinocchio left after the show, claiming that he wanted to see the world. After he leaves, Stromboli is outraged when he notices that Pinocchio escaped from the cage and spots him boarding a stagecoach to Pleasure Island. He decides to recapture him while Geppetto goes out to rescue him as well, with the Blue Fairy following him, attempting to assist him in his quest. Along the way, he meets an inept magician named Lezarno and Professor Buonragazzo who lives in the town of Idyllia, where he and his son make perfect and ideal children who always obey their parents. Geppetto and Stromboli both arrive at Pleasure Island where Geppetto finds out all the boys turn into donkeys after riding a rollercoaster. But because adults are not allowed in Pleasure Island, Stromboli is kicked out while Geppetto arrives just in time to take Pinocchio home, but Pinocchio refuses, saying he did not want him because of what a big disappointment he was to him and immediately turns into a donkey once he gets on the rollercoaster and is shipped off to sea by boat.

Trying to keep up with the boat, Geppetto accidentally gets swallowed by a monstrous whale. Pinocchio jumps off the boat and into the water where he gets swallowed by the whale as well and the donkey curse washes away. They make up and, noticing that they are inside the whale, they attempt to get out by having Pinocchio tell several lies, causing his nose to grow and tickle the whale's uvula to throw them up. Afterwards, they return to the toy shop where Stromboli arrives to take Pinocchio back, still keeping him under the contract. Geppetto offers him his whole shop in exchange for Pinocchio. As Stromboli captures him, Geppetto begs and pleads to the Blue Fairy, who can no longer help, to grant him one last wish. The Blue Fairy then turns Pinocchio into a real boy with her magic, shoos Stromboli away also with her magic, and changes the words on the sign of Geppetto's shop to "Geppetto & Son".

== Cast ==
- Drew Carey as Geppetto
- Julia Louis-Dreyfus as The Blue Fairy
- Brent Spiner as Stromboli
- Rene Auberjonois as Professor Buonragazzo
- Seth Adkins as Pinocchio
- Usher Raymond as Pleasure Island Ringleader
- Wayne Brady as Lezarno the Magician
- Ana Gasteyer as Signora Giovanni
- Anthony Crivello as Bernardo
- Christopher Marquette as Professor Buonragazzo, Jr.
- Renee Olstead as Perfect Child
- Teresa Parente as Maria
- Janel Parrish as Natalie
- Anton Yelchin as Fighting Kid at School
- Patti Cohenour as Featured Performer
- Jonathan Dokuchitz as Featured Performer
- Jason Graae as Featured Performer
- Myles Jeffrey as Featured Performer
- Kristin Klabunde as Featured Performer
- Kyme as Featured Performer
- Tessa Ludwick as Featured Performer
- Paige Miller as Featured Performer
- Sara Paxton as Featured Performer
- Tiler Peck as Featured Performer
- Scarlett Pomers as Featured Performer
- Mark Saul as Featured Performer
- Kyle Sullivan as Featured Performer
- Arnetia Walker as Featured Performer
- Camille Winbush as Featured Performer
- Josh Zuckerman as Featured Performer
- Grover Dale as Featured Performer
- Aaron Spann as Resident of Idyllia
- Kane Hodder as Pleasure Island Inhabitant
- Jack Salvatore Jr. as Pleasure Island Inhabitant
- Figaro as Himself

== Musical numbers ==
1. "Once Upon a Time" – Geppetto
2. "Toys" – Geppetto, town children, parents
3. "Empty Heart" – Geppetto
4. "Geppetto and Son" – Geppetto, Pinocchio
5. "Just Because It's Magic" – Blue Fairy, Geppetto
6. "I've Got No Strings" – Pinocchio
7. "Bravo, Stromboli!" – Stromboli
8. "Toys" (Reprise) – Geppetto, Lezarno
9. "Satisfaction Guaranteed" – Professor Buonragazzo, Buonragazzo Jr., Idyllia residents
10. "Just Because It's Magic" (Reprise) – Blue Fairy
11. "Pleasure Island" – Ringleader, roustabouts, boys
12. "And Son" (Whale Reprise) – Pinocchio, Geppetto
13. "Since I Gave My Heart Away" – Geppetto, Blue Fairy, townspeople
14. "Since I Gave My Heart Away" (Single Version) – Sonya Isaacs

The soundtrack for Geppetto is available from Walt Disney Records, and it features songs from the film composed by Stephen Schwartz, as well as the single "Since I Gave My Heart Away", performed by country and gospel singer Sonya Isaacs.

Jerry Mitchell was the film's choreographer.

== Home media ==
Walt Disney Home Video released the film on VHS on May 30, 2000. It was later released to DVD on September 26 of that year, and subsequently reissued on January 13, 2009.

== Stage ==
In 2006, Geppetto was adapted into a stage musical and renamed Disney's My Son Pinocchio: Geppetto's Musical Tale.

== Awards ==
- Nominated for four Emmy Awards in 2000:
  - Outstanding Art Direction for a Miniseries, Movie or a Special
  - Outstanding Costumes for a Miniseries, Movie or a Special
  - Outstanding Hairstyling for a Miniseries
  - Outstanding Makeup for a Miniseries, Movie or a Special
- Winner of the 2001 Costume Designers Guild Awards for Excellence in Costume Design for Television - Period/Fantasy
- Winner of two Hollywood Makeup Artist and Hair Stylist Guild Awards in 2001
  - Best Period Makeup - Television (for a Mini-Series/Motion Picture Made for Television
  - Best Special Makeup Effects - Television (for a Mini-Series/Motion Picture Made for Television)
- Seth Adkins won the 2000 YoungStar Award for Best Young Actor/Performance in a Miniseries/Made-For-TV Film
