= When Andrew Came Home =

2000 American made-for-television film

- Written by: Susan Rice
- Directed by: Artie Mandelberg
- Starring: Park Overall; Seth Adkins; Jason Beghe; Evan Laszlo
- Music by: Jay Ferguson
- Country of origin: United States
- Original language: English

Production
- Producer: Michael Filerman
- Cinematography: Malcolm Cross
- Editor: Lance Luckey
- Running time: 88 minutes

Original release
- Release: October 30, 2000

When Andrew Came Home, released in the UK as Taming Andrew, is a 2000 American drama television film directed by Artie Mandelberg and starring Park Overall, Seth Adkins, Jason Beghe, and Evan Laszlo. It is based on a true story.

== Plot ==
Ted and his girlfriend Patty kidnap Andrew, Ted's son by his ex-wife Gail. Gail informs the police, but no report is filed. Five years later, Ted returns Andrew to Gail, who has since remarried and has a new son.

When Andrew shows signs of arrested development, Gail takes him to both a doctor and a psychiatrist. They want to send Andrew to a special residential school to help him catch up in his academics. Gail refuses to part with her son once again, so Andrew goes to state-run school instead.

At school, a student named Carl Rudnick bullies Andrew, who responds by urinating on Carl. The principal calls both Gail and Carl's mother. Mrs. Rudnick calls Andrew a freak and says that he should not be in public school, even yelling at Andrew after he apologizes. After Carl and his mother leave, Gail has a discussion with the principal. He wants to hold Andrew back, but she refuses and takes him out of the school. At home, Andrew is nonverbal and incapable of trust. His bizarre behavior drives away Eddie, who moves in with his mother, taking the baby.

Gail begins to teach Andrew at home. Slowly but surely, Andrew makes progress, and things get better for the family. Eddie and baby EJ move back into the house. Social Services tells Gail that if Andrew isn't on grade level by the time the summer ends, she will be forced to send him to the special school. Gail takes Andrew to her brother's farm so he can learn in a new atmosphere where he has no history. Andrew learns how to milk a cow and how to care for the animals very quickly, but still fails academically.

Andrew overhears Gail tell her brother that if she had a choice to pick her son, it wouldn't have been Andrew. He runs out to the stables with Gail close behind. Gail apologizes and Andrew falls asleep in the stables. When he wakes up, Andrew tells his mother about the abuse he suffered at the hands of his father and Patty. He tells his mother that he is home and the two cry in each other's arms and sing their bedtime song together.

Gail and Andrew return home to Eddie and EJ to build a healthier life together. Ted goes to prison for kidnapping and child abuse.

== Cast ==
- Park Overall – Gail
- Jason Beghe – Eddie
- Seth Adkins – Andrew
- Lynne Deragon – Joanne
- Craig Eldridge – Jack
- Shannon Lawson – Deena Drake
- Carl Marotte – Ted
- Patrick Chilvers – Officer Reston
- Jeff Clarke – Mr. Kemper
- Stan Coles – Dr. Burton
- Eve Crawford – Janet Hilgarde
- Jean Daigle – Officer Pearl
- Shane Daly – Highway Cop
- Jake Goldsbie – Carl Rudnick
- Bruce Gray – Dr. Matthews
- Katie Lai – Little Girl
- Bill Lake – Desk Sergeant
- Evan Laszlo – Young Andrew
- Joanne Reece – Officer Warner
- K Roberts – Margaret Granger
- Rhona Shekter – Mrs. Rudnick
- Jared Wall – Kid in Playground
- Patricia Zentilli – Pattie
- Hugo Hardinge – EJ
- Oliver Hardinge – EJ

== Awards ==
- Seth Adkins was nominated for a Young Artist Award (2001) 'Best Performance in a TV Movie (Drama) – Leading Young Actor'
