= I've Got No Strings =

Song by Dickie Jones

from the album Pinocchio (1940 soundtrack)
- Released: 1940
- Label: Victor Records (US); His Master's Voice (UK)
- Composer: Leigh Harline
- Lyricist: Ned Washington

Official audio
- "I've Got No Strings" on YouTube

"I've Got No Strings" (also known as "I Got No Strings") is a song from Walt Disney's animated film Pinocchio (1940), sung by 12-year-old Dickie Jones as Pinocchio. The music was written by Leigh Harline, the lyrics were written by Ned Washington. The recording by Jones was released by Victor Records as catalog number 26479A (in United States) and by EMI on the His Master's Voice label as catalog number BD 822.

The song was also featured in the 2000 television film Geppetto, sung by Seth Adkins, and a 2022 live-action remake, sung by Benjamin Evan Ainsworth as Pinocchio.

The song was featured in the 2015 Marvel Avengers: Age of Ultron trailer, in addition to being in the movie. A year later in 2016, it was used for a commercial for Beats.
