= Funky Monkey (film) =

- Directed by: Harry Basil
- Written by: Lance Kinsey; Peter Nelson; Byron Jelden; Gene Quintano
- Produced by: Moshe Diamant; Frank Hübner; Andrew Stevens
- Starring: Matthew Modine; Roma Downey
- Cinematography: Michael Goi
- Edited by: Stephen Adrianson; John Grover
- Music by: Ceiri Torjussen
- Production company: Franchise Pictures
- Distributed by: Warner Bros. Pictures
- Release date: September 17, 2004
- Running time: 94 minutes
- Countries: United States; Germany
- Language: English
- Budget: $30 million

Funky Monkey is a 2004 comedy film starring Matthew Modine, Seth Adkins and Roma Downey. It is written by Lance Kinsey and Peter Nelson. It is directed by Harry Basil. The plot centers around boy genius, Michael Dean (Adkins), who teams up with a super-talented chimpanzee and his caretaker (Modine) to take down an animal testing lab.

== Plot ==
The story is about Alec McCall (Matthew Modine), a spy, who teams up with Clements, a chimp, to save the day. He has a change of heart when his boss, Flick, turns out to be bad and wants to perform experiments on the chimp. These experiments are to create chimp soldiers for the highest bidder.

McCall takes Clements away on the run to his hometown, where they meet a 13-year-old genius boy named Michael (Seth Adkins). Michael wants to impress a girl by playing on the football team. The coach (Jeffrey Tambor) allows him on the team only if he tutors the star players who are on the brink of being kicked off due to bad grades. Meanwhile, Flick sends his goons out to find the chimp. Michael's single mom, Megan (Roma Downey), a computer programmer, has her eye on McCall, who rents out a room from her. She does not know about Clements, but Michael does.

After the goons fail to get the chimp, Flick goes to get Clements himself by breaking in and gassing Clements and Michael. Flick takes them back to his headquarters so the doctor (Gilbert Gottfried) can perform his experiments. McCall rescues them and they head back for the Homecoming football game. Soon the bad guys show up and dress as football players to play in the game and get Clements. Clements and McCall join the team to stop Flick from winning. Michael wins the game, and Flick and his henchmen are arrested for animal cruelty.

== Cast ==
- Matthew Modine as Alec McCall
- Roma Downey as Megan Dean
- Seth Adkins as Michael Dean
- Gilbert Gottfried as Dr. Spleen
- Jeffrey Tambor as Coach Crane
- Taylor Negron as J. Flick
- Pat Finn as Peters
- Bodhi Elfman as Drummond
- Kaleigh Krish as Christina
- Tommy Davidson as Harland
- Fred Ward as Don Decker
- Jeremy James Kissner as Nathan Tolliver
- Alexandre Aubry as Clemens Impersonator
- Jean Luc Orofino as Clemens Action Impersonator

== Production ==
In December 2001, Development of the film was first announced with ApolloMedia stating their intention to produce Karate Chimps, a $25 million family-oriented action comedy about a simian trained in the martial arts which Gene Quintano would write and direct. An alternate titled considered while the film was in production was A Hairy Tale.

== Release ==
Funky Monkey was released straight-to-video.
