= Seth Adkins =

American actor (born 1989)

- Born: Seth Elijah Adkins; October 30, 1989 (age 36); Albuquerque, New Mexico, U.S.
- Occupation: Actor
- Years active: 1996–present
- Website: www.sethadkins.net

Seth Elijah Adkins (born October 30, 1989) is an American actor. He made his debut as a child actor in the TV shows Small Talk and Sabrina, the Teenage Witch in 1996 and the films ...First Do No Harm and Titanic in 1997. He later made a successful transition to portraying adult characters. Adkins played Pinocchio in the film Geppetto (2000) and appeared in the film Let Me In (2010) directed by Matt Reeves.

== Personal life ==
Adkins was born in Albuquerque, New Mexico. He has two elder brothers, Zachary (b. 1978) and Josh (b. 1981). His father is a principal and his mother a former teacher. At an early age and with the support of his parents, Adkins followed his older brother into the acting profession. He graduated in 2008 from the Public Academy for Performing Arts.

== Career ==
Adkins made his debut in 1996, in the shows Small Talk and in Sabrina, the Teenage Witch. He appeared in the series ER, and C-16: FBI, and in the films ...First Do No Harm, Stir, Titanic. He voiced Duby in the film Baby Geniuses. He had a role in the television movie Wuthering Heights, and in the feature films Funky Monkey, Bad News Bears, Privileged, and Let Me In. Adkins also appeared in the television series CSI: Miami and Touched by an Angel, Judging Amy, NCIS: Naval Criminal Investigative Service, and Crash.

== Filmography ==
=== Film ===
Film
Year	Title	Role	Notes
1997	Titanic	Slovakian 3-Year-Old Boy	
1997	Stir	Matthew Bekins	
1998	Mafia!	Tiny Anthony Cortino	
1999	Pirates of the Plain	Bobby	Lead Role
1999	Baby Geniuses	Duby	Voice
2000	Taming Andrew	Andrew Carlson	
2003	The Failures	Sam Kyle	
2004	Funky Monkey	Michael Dean	
2005	Bad News Bears	Jimmy	
2007	Pirate Camp	Cooper	
2009	Becoming Eduardo	Henry	
2010	Privileged	Nick Webber	
2010	Let Me In	Jett	
2011	This Must Be the Place	Jimmy	
2014	Frontera	Sean	

=== Television ===
Television
Year	Title	Role	Notes
1996	Sabrina, the Teenage Witch	Rex	"A Girl and Her Cat"
1997	ER	Benny Miles	"Fortune's Fools"
1997	C-16: FBI	Daniel Rooney	"Eight Pounds of Pressure"
1997	...First Do No Harm	Robbie Reimuller	Television movie
1998	The Pretender	Nicky Parks	"Silence"
1998	Touched by an Angel	Nick Beringer	"Perfect Little Angel"
1999	The Promise	Billy Stoller	Television movie
2000	Geppetto	Pinocchio	Television musical film
2000	The Drew Carey Show	Pinocchio	"What's Wrong with This Episode III"
2002	CSI: Miami	Conner	"Losing Face"
2002	Paranormal Girl		Television movie
2003	Touched by an Angel	Sam	"A Time for Every Purpose"
2003	Wuthering Heights	Young Hendrix	Television movie
2005	Judging Amy	Charley Dane	"The Long Run"
2005	The West Wing	Cody Zucker	"A Good Day"
2006	NCIS	Sean Hodges	"Iced"
2009	Crash	Lorenzano	"You, I'll Be Following"
2009	Crash	Lorenzano	"No Matter What You Do"
2012	Longmire	TJ Stewart	"A Damn Shame"
2015	The Messengers	Sam	"Awakening"
2020	Better Call Saul	Police Service Assistant	"Wexler v. Goodman"

=== Video games ===
Film
Year	Title	Role	Notes
2002	Kingdom Hearts	Pinocchio	
