= Stir (1997 film) =

- Directed by: Rodion Nakhapetov
- Written by: Rodion Nakhapetov; Eric Lee Bowers
- Produced by: Natasha Shliapnikoff
- Starring: Tony Todd; Traci Lords
- Cinematography: Darco Suvac
- Edited by: James Frisa
- Music by: Keith Bilderbeck
- Production companies: Rogers & Cowan
- Release date: July 25, 1997 (Moscow)
- Running time: 86 minutes
- Country: United States
- Language: English

Stir is a 1997 American thriller drama film directed by Rodion Nakhapetov and starring Traci Lords and Tony Todd.

== Cast ==
- Traci Lords as Kelly Bekins
- Andrew Heckler as Michael Norvic
- Daniel Roebuck as Joseph Bekins
- Seth Adkins as Matt Bekins
- Tony Todd as Bubba
- Karen Black as Dr. Gabrielle Kessler
- Reno Wilson as Wendell
- Rodion Nakhapetov as Businessman

== Release ==
The film was released at the Moscow International Film Festival on July 25, 1997.

== Reception ==
Angela Baldassarre of Variety gave the film a negative review, calling it "an already unpleasant film."

TV Guide also gave the film a negative review: "This is the kind of movie where it takes you an hour to figure out what's going on, by which time you don't care anymore."
