= ...First Do No Harm =

1997 American television film

- DVD cover
- Written by: Ann M. Beckett
- Directed by: Jim Abrahams
- Starring: Meryl Streep; Fred Ward; Seth Adkins; Allison Janney; Margo Martindale; Leo Burmester; Tom Butler
- Music by: Hummie Mann
- Country of origin: United States
- Original language: English

Production
- Executive producers: Michael Jaffe; Howard Braunstein; Jim Abrahams; Meryl Streep
- Producer: Jim Abrahams
- Cinematography: Pierre Letarte
- Editor: Terry Stokes
- Running time: 94 minutes
- Production companies: Pebblehut Productions; Jaffe/Braunstein Films

Original release
- Network: ABC
- Release: February 16, 1997

...First Do No Harm is a 1997 American drama television film produced and directed by Jim Abrahams, written by Ann Beckett, and starring Meryl Streep, Fred Ward, and Seth Adkins. It tells the story of a boy whose severe epilepsy, unresponsive to medications with severe side effects, is controlled by the ketogenic diet. Aspects of the story mirror Abrahams' own experience with his son Charlie.

The film aired on ABC on February 16, 1997. Streep's performance was nominated for an Primetime Emmy Award for Outstanding Lead Actress in a Limited or Anthology Series or Movie, a Golden Globe Award for Best Actress – Miniseries or Television Film and in the Satellite Award for Best Actress – Miniseries or TV Film. Beckett was nominated for the Humanitas Prize (90 minute category). Adkins won a Young Artist Award for his performance.

== Plot ==
The film tells a story in the life of a Midwestern family, the Reimullers. Lori is the mother of three children, and the wife of Dave, a truck driver. The family is presented as happy, normal, and comfortable financially: they have just bought a horse and are planning a holiday to Hawaii. Then the youngest son, Robbie, has a sudden unexplained fall at school. A short while later, he has another unprovoked fall while playing with his brother, and is seen having a convulsive seizure. Robbie is taken to the hospital where several procedures are performed: a CT scan, a lumbar puncture, an electroencephalogram (EEG) and blood tests. No cause is found but the two falls are regarded as epileptic seizures and the child is diagnosed with epilepsy.

Robbie is started on phenobarbital, an old anticonvulsant drug with well-known side effects including cognitive impairment and behavior problems. The latter causes the child to run berserk through the house, leading to injury. Lori urgently phones the physician to request a change of medication. It is changed to phenytoin (Dilantin) but the dose of phenobarbital must be tapered slowly, causing frustration. Later, the drug carbamazepine (Tegretol) is added.

Meanwhile, the Reimullers discover that their health insurance is invalid and their treatment is transferred from private to county hospital. In an attempt to pay the medical bills, Dave takes on more dangerous truckloads and works long hours. Family tensions reach a head when the children realize the holiday is not going to happen and a foreclosure notice is posted on the house.

Robbie's epilepsy gets worse, and he develops a serious rash known as Stevens–Johnson syndrome as a side effect of the medication. He is admitted to the hospital where his padded cot is designed to prevent him escaping. The parents fear he may become a "vegetable" and are losing hope. At one point, Robbie goes into status epilepticus (a continuous convulsive seizure that must be stopped as a medical emergency). Increasing doses of diazepam (Valium) are given intravenously to no effect. Eventually, paraldehyde is given rectally. This drug is described as having possibly fatal side effects and is seen dramatically melting a plastic cup (a glass syringe is required).

The neurologist in charge of Robbie's care, Dr. Melanie Abbasac, has a poor bedside manner and paints a bleak picture. Abbasac wants the Reimullers to consider surgery and start the necessary investigative procedures to see if this is an option. These involve removing the top of the skull and inserting electrodes on the surface of the brain to achieve a more accurate location of any seizure focus than normal scalp EEG electrodes. The Reimullers see surgery as a dangerous last resort and want to know if anything else can be done.

Lori begins to research epilepsy at the library. After many hours, she comes across the ketogenic diet in a well-regarded textbook on epilepsy. However, their doctor dismisses the diet as having only anecdotal evidence of its effectiveness. After initially refusing to consider the diet, she appears to relent but sets impossible hurdles in the way: the Reimullers must find a way to transport their son to Johns Hopkins Hospital in Baltimore, Maryland with continual medical support—something they cannot afford.

That evening, Lori attempts to abduct her son from the hospital and, despite the risk, flies with him to an appointment she has made with a doctor at Johns Hopkins. However, she is stopped by hospital security at the exit to the hospital. A sympathetic nurse warns Lori that she could lose custody of her son if a court decides she is putting her son's health at risk.

Dave makes contact with an old family friend who once practiced as a physician and is still licensed. This doctor and the sympathetic nurse agree to accompany Lori and Robbie on the trip to Baltimore. During the flight, Robbie has a prolonged convulsive seizure, which causes some concern to the pilot and crew.

When they arrive at Johns Hopkins, it becomes apparent that Lori has deceived her friends as her appointment (for the previous week) was not rescheduled and there are no places on the ketogenic diet program. After much pleading, Dr. Freeman agrees to take Robbie on as an outpatient. Lori and Robbie stay at a convent in Baltimore.

The diet is briefly explained by Millicent Kelly, a dietitian who has helped run the ketogenic diet program since the 1940s. Robbie's seizures begin to improve during the initial fast that is used to kick-start the diet. Despite the very high-fat nature of the diet, Robbie accepts the food and rapidly improves. His seizures are eliminated and his mental faculties are restored. The film ends with Robbie riding the family horse at a parade through town. Closing credits claim Robbie continued the diet for a couple of years and has remained seizure- and drug-free ever since.

== Cast ==
- Meryl Streep as Lori Reimuller
- Fred Ward as Dave Reimuller
- Seth Adkins as Robbie Reimuller
- Allison Janney as Dr. Melanie Abbasac
- Margo Martindale as Marjean
- Leo Burmester as Bob Purdue
- Tom Butler as Dr. Jim Peterson
- Mairon Bennett as Lynne Reimuller
- Michael Yarmush as Mark Reimuller
- Millicent Kelly as herself

== See also ==
- Never event
- Primum non nocere
