= Yentl (play) =

1975 play by Napolin and Singer

- Original language: English
- Written by: Leah Napolin; Isaac Bashevis Singer
- Characters: Yentl; Avigdor; Hadass; Sheftel
- Subject: Gender roles, religion
- Genre: Drama
- Setting: Poland, 1873

Premiere
- Date: October 23, 1975
- Place: Eugene O'Neill Theatre, New York City, New York

Yentl (1975) is a play by Leah Napolin and Isaac Bashevis Singer. It premiered in New York City.

Based on Singer's short story "Yentl the Yeshiva Boy" (first published in September 1962 in Commentary magazine and later included in the 1963 collection Short Friday and Other Stories), it centers on a young woman who defies tradition by discussing and debating Jewish law and theology with her rabbi father.

(This story was also adapted as an American film Yentl. Released in 1983, it was produced, directed by, and starred Barbra Streisand.)

After her father dies, the young woman cuts her hair, dresses as a man, and sets out to find a yeshiva where she can continue to study Talmud and live secretly as a male named Anshel. When her study partner Avigdor discovers the truth, she is conflicted about pursuing a relationship with him because it will compromise her higher calling. The play focuses on the spiritual equality of women in a segregated Jewish society that does not consider women as equals to men, but at the same time prioritizes religion and relationship to God above all else. More generally, the play's conflict is between one's need for self-actualization and the demands of society as well as one's baser desires.

Another play of the same name, Yentl, based on the same story, was written by Gary Abrahams, Elise Hearst and Galit Klas, and first produced by Kadimah Yiddish Theatre in Australia in 2022. It made its international premiere in London in 2025.

== Production ==
=== Broadway (1975) ===
Yentl premiered at the Chelsea Theater Center in 1974 in a production directed by Robert Kalfin. An edited version of the production premiered on Broadway at the Eugene O'Neill Theatre on October 15, 1975, played eleven previews, opened on October 23, 1975, and ran for 223 performances, concluding on May 2, 1976. It was directed by Robert Kalfin. The cast included Tovah Feldshuh, John Shea, and Lynn Ann Leveridge. It was produced by Cheryl Crawford, Moe Septee, and associate producer Paul B. Berkowsky. Scenic design was by Karl Eigsti, with costumes designed by Carrie F. Robbins, lighting designed by William Mintzer, hair design by Patrick Moreton. The general manager was Paul B. Berkowsky, the company manager was Gino Giglio, the production stage manager was Clint Jakeman, the stage manager was Richard Manheim, and the general press representative was Betty Lee Hunt.

== Cast ==
- Hy Anzell – Mordecai / Feitl
- Herman O. Arbeit – Treitl / Reb Alter
- Mary Ellen Ashley – Rivka / Necheleh / Chambermaid
- Robin Bartlett – Raizeleh / Avram
- Stephen dePietri – Shmuel / Zisheh / Dr. Chanina / Musician
- Blanche Dee – Pesheh
- David Eric – Moishe / Gershon / Musician
- Tovah Feldshuh – Yentl
- Elaine Grollman – Ziateh
- Rita Karin – Yachna
- Lynn Ann Leveridge – Hadass
- Leland Moss – Lemmel / Yussel / Wedding Jester / Dr. Solomon / Mohel / Musician
- Albert M Ottenheimer – Nehemiah / The Rabbi / Sheftel
- Bernie Passeltiner – Reb Todrus / Laibish / The Cantor / Messenger / Musician
- Natalie Priest – Frumka
- Reuben Schafer – Reb Nata / The Shamus / Zelig
- Madeline Shaw – Zelda-Leah / Shimmel
- John V. Shea – Avigdor
- Michael James Strafford – Dovid / Yitzhok / Musician
- Diane Tarleton – Finki / Berel

== Screen adaptation ==
As early as 1968, Barbra Streisand had expressed interest in a film adaptation of Singer's short story. Using the Napolin/Singer play as her source material, she wrote a detailed forty-two page treatment, the first to conceive of the movie version as a musical. The resulting 1983 production veered dramatically from the original short story and play by allowing Yentl to reveal her true feelings for Avigdor and having her return to her female self and sail for the United States at the end.

The film received a scathing review from Singer, who was particularly taken aback by Streisand's monopolization of the production to its detriment:

When an actor is also the producer and the director and the writer he would have to be exceedingly wise to curb his appetites. I must say that Miss Streisand was exceedingly kind to herself. The result is that Miss Streisand is always present, while poor Yentl is absent.

The film was well received by others, however, including reviewers at Time, Variety and Newsweek. Box office receipts were also healthy, both domestically and internationally, and the film was ranked 19th in the year's moneymakers. At awards time, Streisand was snubbed at the Oscars, but the film itself received four nominations, notably winning for Best Original Music Score. Yentl won two Golden Globe Awards for Best Director and Best Motion Picture (Musical or Comedy).

== Awards and nominations ==
Year	Association	Category	Recipient	Result
1975	Drama Desk Awards	Special Mention	Tovah Feldshuh	Won
1975	Drama Desk Awards	Outstanding Actress in a Play	Tovah Feldshuh	Nominated
1976	Drama Desk Awards	Unique Theatrical Experience		Nominated
1976	Drama Desk Awards	Outstanding Actress in a Play	Tovah Feldshuh	Nominated
1976	Drama Desk Awards	Outstanding Featured Actress in a Play	Lynn Ann Leveridge	Nominated
1976	Theatre World Awards	Outstanding Individual	Tovah Feldshuh	Won
1976	Theatre World Awards	Outstanding Individual	John V. Shea	Won
1976	Tony Awards	Best Actress in a Play	Tovah Feldshuh	Nominated

== Production of Yentl (2022 play) ==
=== Australia (2022) ===
The Yentl play written by Abrahams, Hearst and Klas premiered at the Arts Centre Melbourne in 2022, directed by Gary Abrahams, and transferred to the Sydney Opera House in 2024.

=== London (2026) ===
This production transferred to the Marylebone Theatre in London in March 2026.

== See also ==
- Cross-dressing in film and television
- Yentl syndrome

== Bibliography ==
- Napoleon, Davi. Chelsea on the Edge: The Adventures of an American Theater. Includes a chapter on Yentl, the story, the play, and the movie. The dramatic chapter goes into detail about several controversies between strong individuals—Isaac B Singer and Kalfin, Kalfin and Feldshuh, Singer and Streisand, and Kalfin and Streisand. It also includes descriptions of the play and movie. Iowa State University Press. ISBN 0-8138-1713-7, 1991.
