= Lina Lambraki =

Lina Lambrakis (Komotini, 1935 – Thessaloniki, April 28, 2013) was a Greek theater actress.

== Biography ==
Born in 1935 in Komotini, Thrace, Lina Lambrakis studied at the Drama School of Lykourgos Stavrakos, in Athens.

In 1971, she moved to Thessaloniki, to work on behalf of the National Theatre of Northern Greece, a collaboration which lasted for the rest of her life. Her first participation as an actress took place in 1972, in the play Iphigenia in Tauris by Euripides.

Among her most important successes was her participation in the play Electra by Sophocles, in 1975, directed by Minos Volanakis, which was of decisive importance for the continuation of her professional career.

During the period between 1978 and 1980, he was a member of the local Representative Committee of the Union of Greek Actors, as well as, during the period between 1981 and 1983, a member of the board of directors of the National Theatre of Northern Greece. During the period between 1989 and 1990, she attempted to engage in politics through her candidacy as a member of parliament on behalf of the Panhellenic Socialist Movement.

Her last participation was the anniversary performance "Mikra Dionysia", in 2011, directed by Yiannis Rigas and Grigoris Karatinakis, in the context of the celebration of the 50 years of history of the National Theatre of Northern Greece.

After the end of her professional career as an actress, she pursued a career as an acting teacher within the Drama School of the National Theatre of Northern Greece.

She died in April 2013, in the city of Thessaloniki where she lived, while her funeral took place a few days later 29 April 2013 in Thermi.
