= Volanakis =

Volanakis is a surname. Notable people with the surname include:

- Konstantinos Volanakis (c. 1837–1907), Greek painter
- Minos Volanakis
- Polydefkis Volanakis (born 2003), Greek footballer
