= Meryl Streep =

American actress (born 1949)

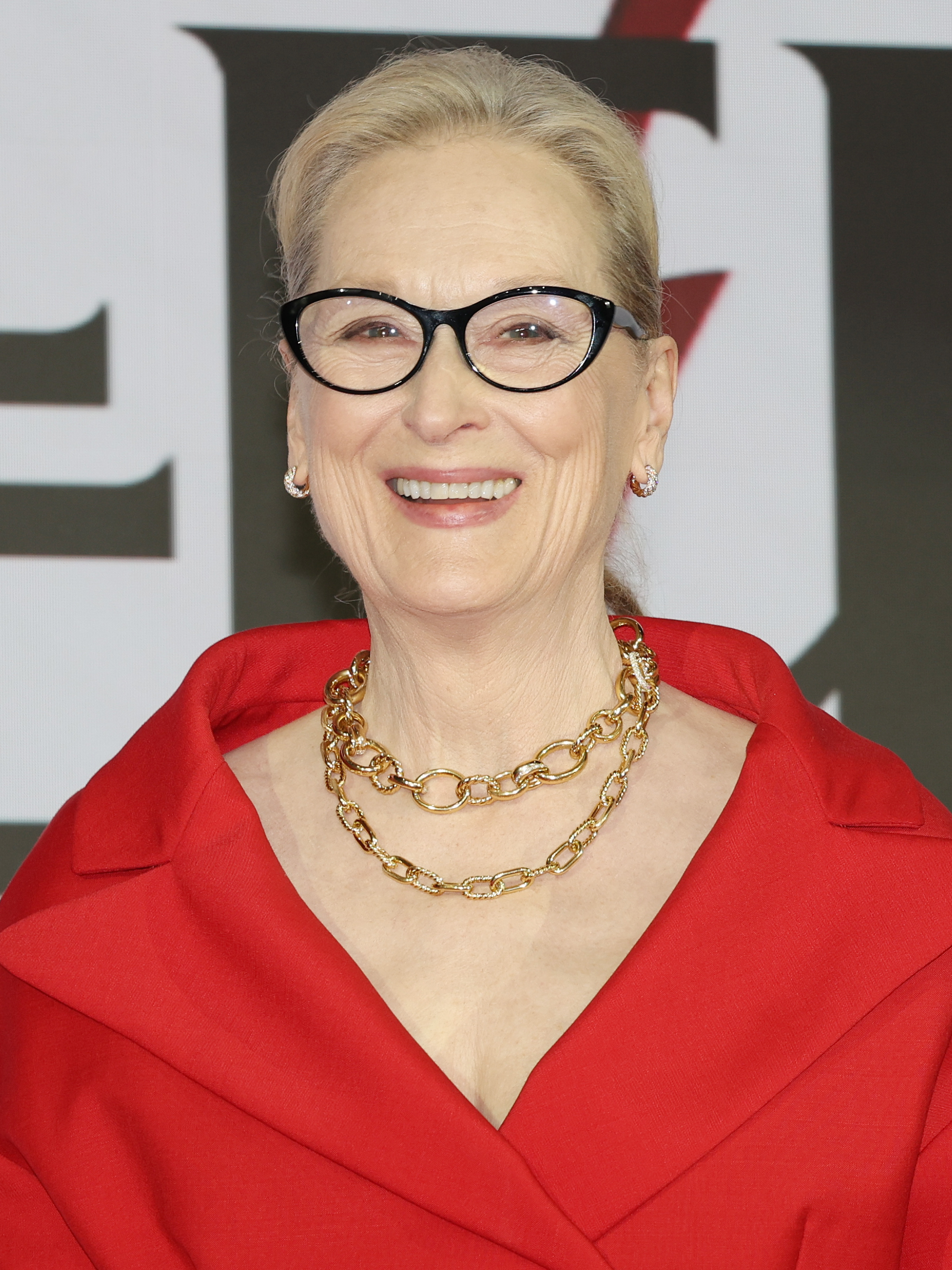
- Streep in 2026
- Born: Mary Louise Streep; June 22, 1949 (age 77); Summit, New Jersey, U.S.
- Education: Vassar College (AB); Yale University (MFA)
- Occupation: Actress
- Years active: 1975–present
- Works: Full list
- Spouse: Don Gummer (m. 1978; sep. 2017)
- Partner(s): John Cazale (1976–1978; his death)
- Children: Henry Wolfe; Mamie Gummer; Grace Gummer; Louisa Jacobson
- Mother: Mary Wilkinson Streep
- Awards: Full list

Mary Louise "Meryl" Streep (born June 22, 1949) is an American actress. Widely regarded by peers and critics as the greatest actress of her generation, and by many with the affectionate epitaph "Greatest of All Time", she is recognized as one of the most versatile performers in cinema, noted for her technical precision, nuanced emotional depth, command of dialects, and professional longevity. Streep is an alumna of Vassar College and the Yale School of Drama, holding a Bachelor of Arts and a Master of Fine Arts. Her artistic process often includes refining her characters' dialogue so that their motivations possess a psychological depth and agency that transcend traditional archetypes. Beyond her creative work, she is a prominent advocate for gender parity, labor protections, and challenging the influence of the male gaze in film criticism and production.

Streep began her professional stage career in 1975 in Trelawny of the Wells and earned a Tony Award nomination the following year for 27 Wagons Full of Cotton. She transitioned to film in Julia (1977), followed by her first Academy Award nomination for The Deer Hunter (1978). For Kramer vs. Kramer (1979), she won her first Oscar after advocating to rewrite her character's courtroom testimony, shifting the role from a secondary antagonist to a portrayal focused on a woman's autonomy. She became a leading actress of the 1980s with performances in The French Lieutenant's Woman (1981), Sophie's Choice (1982), Out of Africa (1985), and A Cry in the Dark (1988), for which she received the Best Actress Award at Cannes.

After expanding into various genres in the 1990s, Streep achieved a new level of commercial stardom in the 2000s. She transitioned from her established dramatic niche to lead high-grossing mainstream successes, portraying a formidable antagonist in The Devil Wears Prada (2006) and a singing lead in the musical Mamma Mia! (2008). During this period, she continued to receive critical acclaim for her dramatic turns in Doubt (2008) and The Iron Lady (2011), the latter earning her a third Academy Award.

Streep's career honors include eight Golden Globe Awards, three Academy Awards, three Primetime Emmy Awards, two British Academy Film Awards (BAFTAs), two Screen Actors Guild (SAG) Awards, and one Children's and Family Emmy Award. She is a recipient of the American Film Institute (AFI) Life Achievement Award, the Honorary Palme d'Or, the Kennedy Center Honor, the Golden Globe Cecil B. DeMille Award, and an Honorary César. In 2014, she was awarded the Presidential Medal of Freedom. She holds the record for the most Golden Globe and Academy Award nominations of any performer, with 34 and 21 respectively. A prolific artist, her career spans over 64 films, 18 television projects, 30 audiobooks and 20 musical recordings.

== Early life and education ==
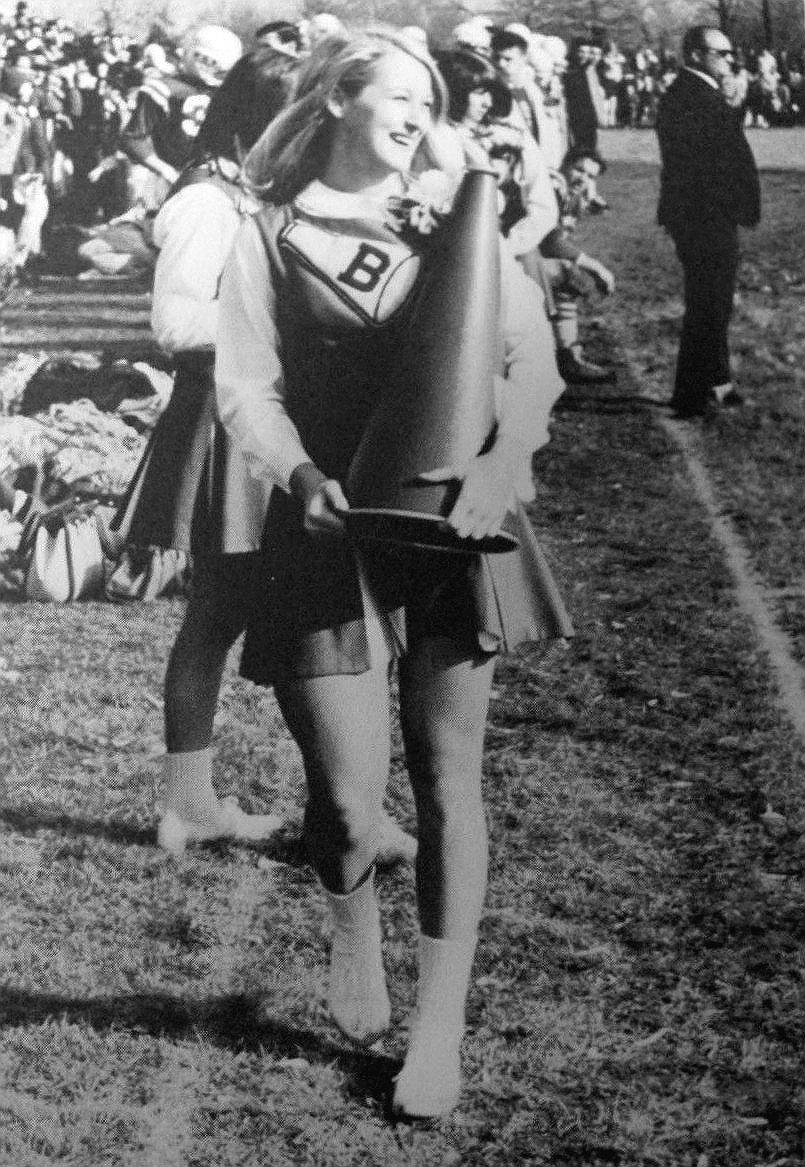
Streep as a cheerleader at Bernards High School, 1966

Mary Louise Streep was born on June 22, 1949, in Summit, New Jersey, to artist Mary Wilkinson Streep and pharmaceutical executive Harry William Streep Jr. She has two younger brothers, Harry William Streep III and Dana David Streep, both actors. Streep's mother, who she claims looks like Dame Judi Dench, strongly encouraged her daughter and instilled confidence in her from a very young age. Streep said, "She was a mentor because she said to me, 'Meryl, you're capable. You're so great.' She was saying, 'You can do whatever you put your mind to. If you're lazy, you're not going to get it done. But if you put your mind to it, you can do anything.' And I believed her." Although she was naturally more introverted than her mother, when she later needed an injection of confidence in adulthood, she would consult her mother at times for advice.

Streep was raised as a Presbyterian in Basking Ridge, New Jersey, and attended Cedar Hill Elementary School and the Oak Street School, which was a junior high school at that time. In her junior high debut, she starred as Louise Heller in the play The Family Upstairs. In 1963, the family moved to Bernardsville, New Jersey, where she attended Bernards High School. As a "gawky kid with glasses and frizzy hair", she liked to show off in front of the camera in family home movies from a young age. At age 12, Streep was selected to sing at a school recital, leading to her having opera lessons from Estelle Liebling. Despite her talent, she later remarked, "I was singing something I didn't feel and understand. That was an important lesson—not to do that. To find the thing that I could feel through." She quit after four years. Streep had many Catholic school friends and regularly attended Mass. She was a high school cheerleader for the Bernards High School Mountaineers and was also chosen as the homecoming queen her senior year.

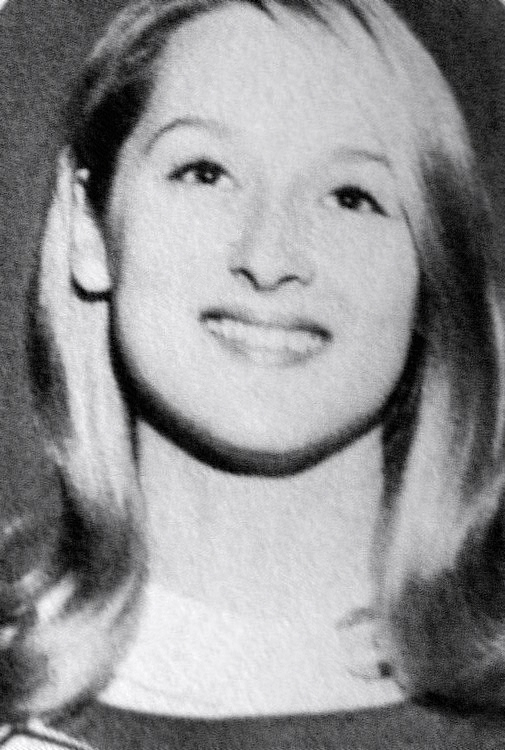
Streep as a senior in high school, 1966

Although Streep appeared in numerous school plays in high school, she was uninterested in serious theater until acting in the play Miss Julie at Vassar College in 1969, in which she gained attention across the campus. Vassar drama professor Clinton J. Atkinson noted, "I don't think anyone ever taught Meryl acting. She really taught herself." Streep demonstrated an early ability to mimic accents and to quickly memorize her lines. She earned her AB in drama cum laude in 1971, before applying for a Master of Fine Arts (MFA) degree from the Yale School of Drama. At Yale, she supplemented her course fees by working as a waitress and typist, and appeared in over a dozen stage productions per year; at one point, she became overworked and developed ulcers, so she contemplated quitting acting and switching to study law. Streep played a variety of roles on stage, from Helena in A Midsummer Night's Dream to an 80-year-old woman in a wheelchair in a comedy written by then-unknown playwrights Christopher Durang and Albert Innaurato. She was a student of choreographer Carmen de Lavallade, whom she introduced at the 2017 Kennedy Center Honors. Another of her teachers was Robert Lewis, a co-founder of the Actors Studio. Streep disapproved of some of the acting exercises she was asked to do, remarking that one professor taught the emotional recall technique by delving into personal lives in a way she found "obnoxious". She earned her MFA in drama from Yale in 1975. She also enrolled as a visiting student at Dartmouth College in 1970 and received an honorary Doctor of Arts degree from the college in 1981.

== Career ==
=== 1970s: Early work and breakthrough ===
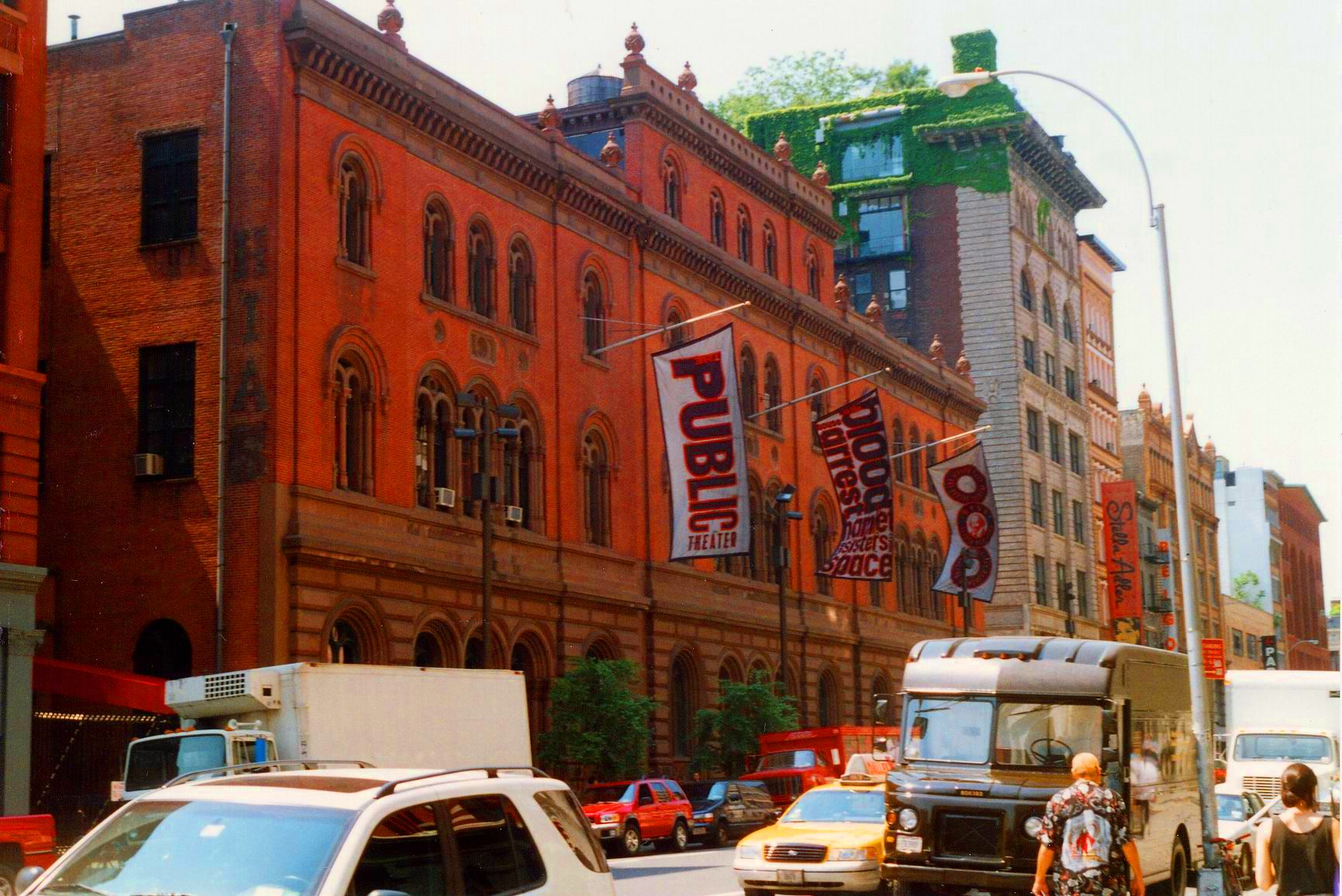
Streep started her career acting in numerous productions with The Public Theater in New York City.

One of Streep's first professional jobs in 1975 was at the Eugene O'Neill Theater Center's National Playwrights Conference, during which she acted in five plays over six weeks. She moved to New York City in 1975, and was cast by Joseph Papp in a production of Trelawny of the Wells at the Vivian Beaumont Theater, opposite Mandy Patinkin and John Lithgow. She went on to appear in five more roles in her first year in New York, including in Papp's New York Shakespeare Festival productions of Henry V, The Taming of the Shrew with Raul Julia, and Measure for Measure opposite Sam Waterston and John Cazale. She entered into a relationship with Cazale at this time, and resided with him until his death three years later. She starred in the Bertolt Brecht-Kurt Weill musical Happy End on Broadway, and won an Obie for her performance in the off-Broadway play Alice at the Palace.

Although Streep had not aspired to become a film actor, Robert De Niro's performance in Taxi Driver (1976) had a profound impact on her; she said to herself, 'That's the kind of actor I want to be when I grow up.' Streep began auditioning for film roles, and underwent an unsuccessful audition for the lead role in Dino De Laurentiis's remake of the action adventure King Kong which was released in 1976. De Laurentiis, referring to Streep as she stood before him, said in Italian to his son: "This is so ugly. Why did you bring me this?" Unknown to Laurentiis, Streep understood Italian, and she remarked, "I'm very sorry that I'm not as beautiful as I should be, but, you know – this is it. This is what you get." She continued to work on Broadway, appearing in the 1976 double bill of Tennessee Williams' 27 Wagons Full of Cotton and Arthur Miller's A Memory of Two Mondays. She received a Tony Award nomination for Best Featured Actress in a Play. Streep's other Broadway credits include Anton Chekhov's The Cherry Orchard and Happy End, in which she had originally appeared off-Broadway at the Chelsea Theater Center. She received Drama Desk Award nominations for both productions.

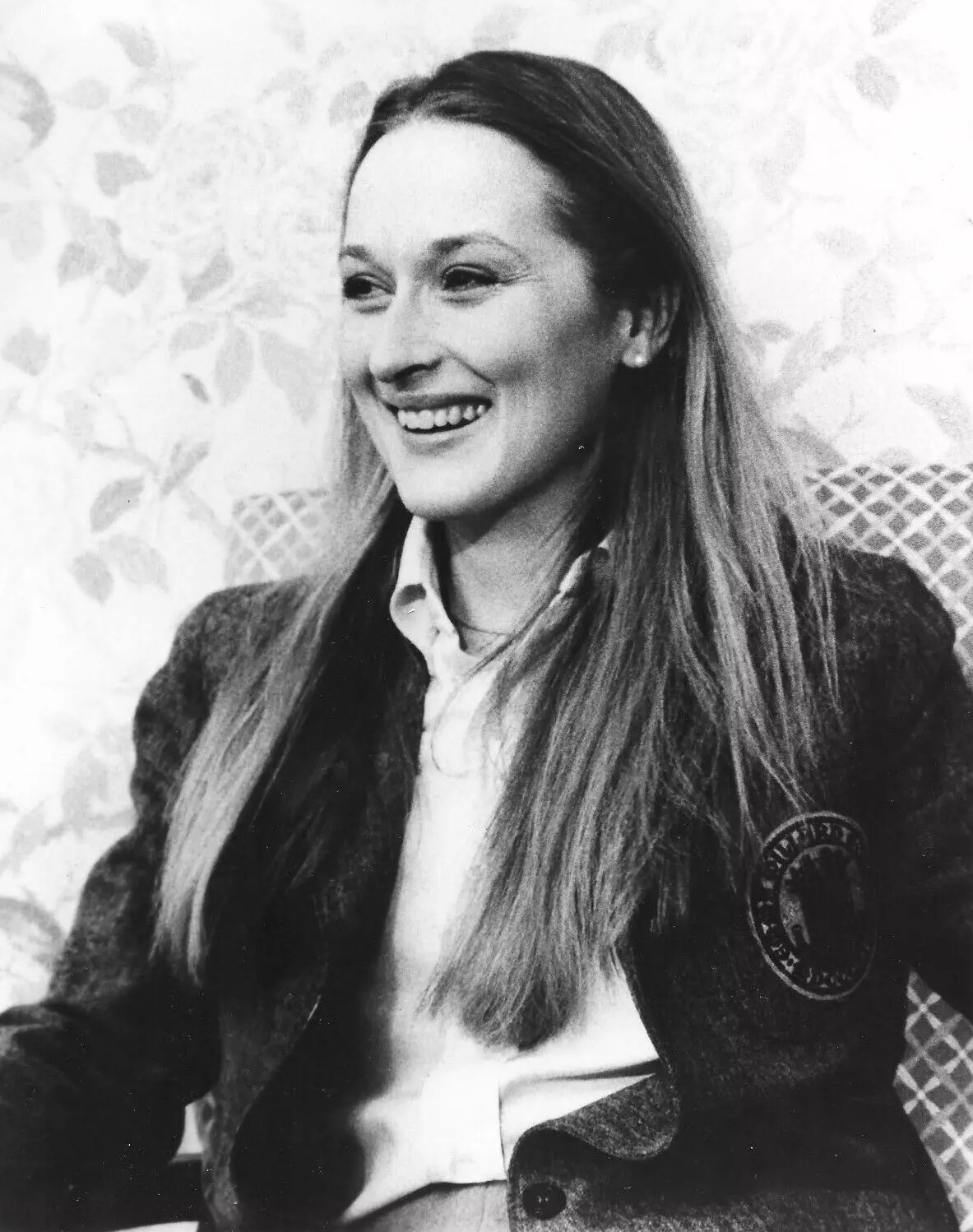
Streep in 1978

Streep's first feature film role came opposite Jane Fonda in the 1977 film Julia, in which she had a small role during a flashback sequence. Most of her scenes were edited out, but the brief time on screen horrified the actress, "I had a bad wig and they took the words from the scene I shot with Jane and put them in my mouth in a different scene. I thought, I've made a terrible mistake, no more movies. I hate this business." However, Streep stated in 2015 that Fonda had a lasting influence on her as an actress, and credited her with opening "probably more doors than I probably even know about". De Niro, who had spotted Streep in her stage production of The Cherry Orchard, suggested that she play the role of his girlfriend in the war film The Deer Hunter (1978). Cazale, who had been diagnosed with lung cancer, was also cast in the film, and Streep took on the role of a "vague, stock girlfriend" to remain with Cazale for the duration of filming. Pauline Kael, who later became a strong critic of Streep, remarked that she was a "real beauty" who brought much freshness to the film with her performance. The film's success exposed Streep to a wider audience and earned her a nomination for the Academy Award for Best Supporting Actress.

In the 1978 TV miniseries Holocaust, Streep played the leading role of a German woman married to a Jewish artist played by James Woods in Nazi era Germany. She found the material to be "unrelentingly noble" and professed to have taken on the role for financial gain. Streep travelled to Germany and Austria for filming while Cazale remained in New York. Upon her return, Streep found that Cazale's illness had progressed, and she nursed him until his death on March 12, 1978. With an estimated audience of 109 million, Holocaust brought a wider degree of public recognition to Streep, who found herself "on the verge of national visibility". She won the Primetime Emmy Award for Outstanding Lead Actress in a Miniseries or a Movie for her performance. Despite the success, Streep was still not enthusiastic towards her filmed work and preferred acting on stage.

She played the supporting role of Leilah in Wendy Wasserstein's Uncommon Women and Others in a May 1978 "Theater in America" television production for PBS's Great Performances. She replaced Glenn Close, who played the role in the Off-Broadway production at the Phoenix Theatre in the East Village. Hoping to divert herself from the grief of Cazale's death, Streep accepted a role in The Seduction of Joe Tynan (1979) as the chirpy love interest of Alan Alda, later commenting that she played it on "automatic pilot". She performed the role of Katherine in The Taming of the Shrew for Shakespeare in the Park. That same year she played a supporting role as the former girlfriend turned lesbian in Manhattan (1979) for Woody Allen. Streep later said that Allen did not provide her with a complete script, did not permit her to improvise a word of dialogue, and gave her only the six pages of her own scenes. Despite this, Vincent Canby of The New York Times described her performance as being "beautifully played".

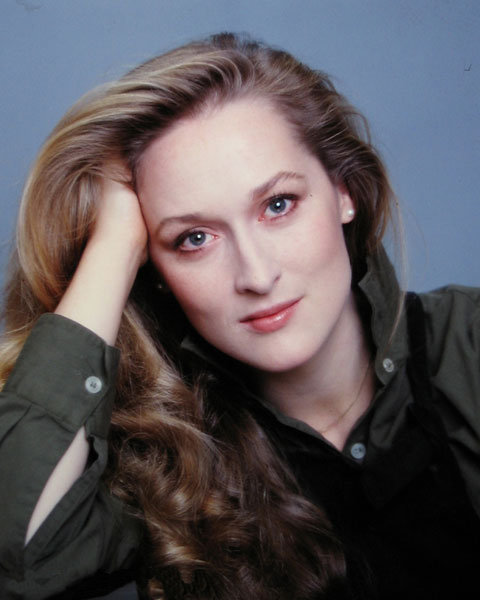
Streep in 1977

In the drama Kramer vs. Kramer (1979), Streep was cast opposite Dustin Hoffman as an unhappily married woman who abandons her husband and child. Streep thought that the script portrayed the female character as "too evil" and insisted that it was not representative of real women who faced marriage breakdown and child custody battles. The makers agreed, and the script was revised. In preparing for the part, Streep spoke to her own mother about her life as a wife with a career, and frequented the Upper East Side neighborhood in which the film was set, watching the interactions between parents and children. The director Robert Benton allowed Streep to write her own dialogue in two key scenes, despite some objection from Hoffman, who, at first, "hated her guts". (Note: Streep's initial impression of Hoffman had been a negative one, thinking him to have been an "obnoxious pig" when she had first met him on stage several years earlier, and Hoffman had admitted that he initially "hated her guts", but respected her as an actress.) Hoffman and producer Stanley R. Jaffe later spoke of Streep's tirelessness, with Hoffman commenting: "She's extraordinarily hard-working, to the extent that she's obsessive. I think that she thinks about nothing else, but what she's doing." The film was controversial among feminists, but it was a role which film critic Stephen Farber believed displayed Streep's "own emotional intensity", writing that she was one of the "rare performers who can imbue the most routine moments with a hint of mystery".

For the film, Streep won both the Golden Globe Award and the Academy Award for Best Supporting Actress, which she famously left in the ladies' room after giving her speech. She received awards from the Los Angeles Film Critics Association, National Board of Review and National Society of Film Critics for her collective work in her three film releases of 1979. Both The Deer Hunter and Kramer vs. Kramer were major commercial successes and were consecutive winners of the Academy Award for Best Picture.

=== 1980s: Rise to prominence ===
In 1979, Streep began workshopping Alice in Concert, a musical version of Alice's Adventures in Wonderland, with writer and composer Elizabeth Swados and director Joseph Papp; the show was put on at New York's Public Theater from December 1980. Frank Rich of The New York Times referred to Streep as the production's "one wonder", but questioned why she devoted so much energy to it. By 1980, Streep had progressed to leading roles in films. She was featured on the cover of Newsweek magazine with the headline "A Star for the 80s"; Jack Kroll commented, "There's a sense of mystery in her acting; she doesn't simply imitate (although she's a great mimic in private). She transmits a sense of danger, a primal unease lying just below the surface of normal behavior".

Streep denounced her fervent media coverage at the time as "excessive hype". The story within a story 1981 drama The French Lieutenant's Woman was Streep's first leading role. The film paired her with Jeremy Irons as contemporary actors, telling their modern story, as well as the Victorian era drama they were performing. Streep developed an English accent for the part, but considered herself a misfit for the role: "I couldn't help wishing that I was more beautiful". (Note: Despite Streep's own negative self-body-image, President Obama, while presenting the Kennedy Center Honors, remarked, "Anyone who saw The French Lieutenant's Woman had a crush on her ...") A New York magazine article commented that, while many female stars of the past had cultivated a singular identity in their films, Streep was a "chameleon", willing to play any type of role. Streep was awarded a BAFTA Award for Best Actress in a Leading Role for her work. The following year, she re-united with director Robert Benton for the psychological thriller, Still of the Night (1982), co-starring Roy Scheider and Jessica Tandy. Vincent Canby, writing for The New York Times, noted that the film was an homage to the works of Alfred Hitchcock, but that one of its main weaknesses was a lack of chemistry between Streep and Scheider, concluding that Streep "is stunning, but she's not on screen anywhere near long enough".

Greater success came later in the year when Streep starred in the drama Sophie's Choice (also 1982), portraying a Polish survivor of Auschwitz caught in a love triangle between a young naïve writer (Peter MacNicol) and a Jewish intellectual (Kevin Kline). Streep's emotional dramatic performance and her apparent mastery of a Polish accent drew praise. William Styron wrote the novel with Ursula Andress in mind for the title role, but Streep was determined to get it. She filmed the "choice" scene in one take and refused to do it again, finding it extremely painful and emotionally exhausting. That scene, in which Sophie is ordered by an SS guard at Auschwitz to choose which of her two children would be gassed and which would proceed to the labor camp, is her most famous scene, according to Emma Brockes of The Guardian who wrote in 2006: "It's classic Streep, the kind of scene that makes your scalp tighten, but defter in a way is her handling of smaller, harder-to-grasp emotions".

Among several acting awards, Streep won the Academy Award for Best Actress for her performance, and her characterization was voted the third greatest movie performance of all time by Premiere magazine. Roger Ebert said of her delivery, "Streep plays the Brooklyn scenes with an enchanting Polish-American accent (she has the first accent I've ever wanted to hug), and she plays the flashbacks in subtitled German and Polish. There is hardly an emotion that Streep doesn't touch in this movie, and yet we're never aware of her straining. This is one of the most astonishing and yet one of the most unaffected and natural performances I can imagine". Pauline Kael, on the contrary, called the film an "infuriatingly bad movie", and thought that Streep "decorporealizes" herself, which she believed explained why her movie heroines "don't seem to be full characters, and why there are no incidental joys to be had from watching her".

In 1983, Streep played her first nonfictional character, the nuclear whistleblower and labor union activist Karen Silkwood, who died in a suspicious car accident while investigating alleged wrongdoing at the Kerr-McGee plutonium plant, in Mike Nichols' biographical film Silkwood. Streep felt a personal connection to the subject, and in preparation, she met with people close to Silkwood, and in doing so realized that each person saw a different aspect of her personality. She said, "I didn't try to turn myself into Karen. I just tried to look at what she did. I put together every piece of information I could find about her ... What I finally did was look at the events in her life, and try to understand her from the inside". Jack Kroll of Newsweek considered Streep's characterization to have been "brilliant", while Silkwood's boyfriend Drew Stephens expressed approval in that Streep had played Karen as a human being rather than a myth, despite Karen's father Bill thinking that Streep and the film had dumbed his daughter down. Pauline Kael believed that Streep had been miscast.

Streep next played opposite Robert De Niro in the romance Falling in Love (1984), which was poorly received. She portrayed a fighter for the French Resistance during World War II in the British drama Plenty (1985), adapted from the play by David Hare. For the latter, Ebert wrote that Streep conveyed "great subtlety; it is hard to play an unbalanced, neurotic, self-destructive woman, and do it with such gentleness and charm ... Streep creates a whole character around a woman who could have simply been a catalogue of symptoms." In 2008, Molly Haskell praised Streep's performance in Plenty, believing it to be "one of Streep's most difficult and ambiguous" films and "most feminist" role.

In her next film, Out of Africa (1985), Streep starred as the Danish writer Karen Blixen, opposite Robert Redford's Denys Finch Hatton. Director Sydney Pollack was initially dubious about Streep in the role, as he did not consider her sexy enough, and had considered Jane Seymour for the part. Pollack recalls that Streep impressed him in a different way: "She was so direct, so honest, so without bullshit. There was no shielding between her and me." Streep and Pollack often clashed during the 101-day shoot in Kenya, particularly over Blixen's voice. Streep had spent much time listening to tapes of Blixen, and began speaking in an old-fashioned and aristocratic fashion, which Pollack thought excessive. A significant commercial success, the film won a Golden Globe for Best Picture. It also earned Streep another Academy Award nomination for Best Actress, and the film ultimately won Best Picture. Film critic Stanley Kauffmann praised her performance, writing "Meryl Streep is back in top form. This means her performance in Out of Africa is at the highest level of acting in film today."

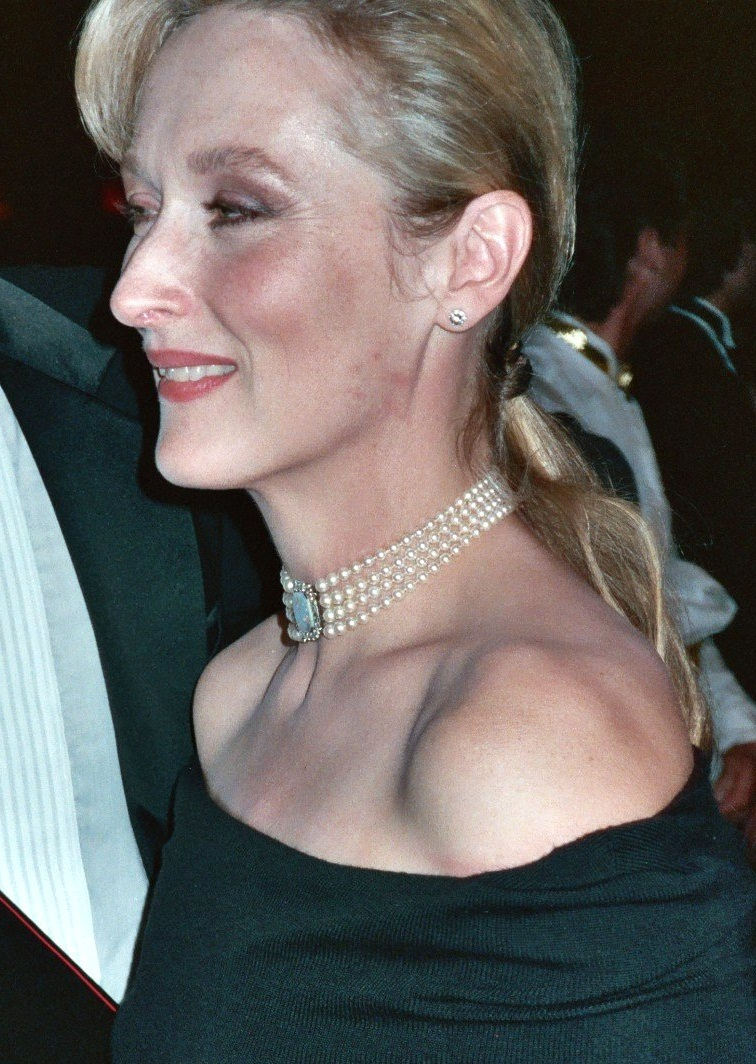
Streep at the 61st Academy Awards, 1989

Streep's next films did not appeal to a wide audience; she co-starred with Jack Nicholson in the dramas Heartburn (1986) and Ironweed (1987). In Evil Angels (Note: The film was released outside Australia and New Zealand as A Cry in the Dark.) (1988), she played Lindy Chamberlain, an Australian woman who had been convicted of the murder of her infant daughter despite claiming that the baby had been taken by a dingo. Filmed in Australia, Streep won the Australian Film Institute Award for Best Actress in a Leading Role, a Best Actress at the Cannes Film Festival, and the New York Film Critics Circle Award for Best Actress. She has said of developing the Australian accent in the film: "I had to study a little bit for Australian because it's not dissimilar [to American], so it's like coming from Italian to Spanish. You get a little mixed up." Canby of The New York Times described her performance as "another stunning performance", played with "the kind of virtuosity that seems to re-define the possibilities of screen acting".

In 1989, Streep lobbied to play the lead role in Oliver Stone's adaption of the play Evita, but two months before filming was due to commence, she dropped out, citing "exhaustion" initially, although it was later revealed that there was a dispute over her salary. By the end of the decade, Streep actively looked to star in a comedy. She found the role in She-Devil (1989), a satire that parodied societal obsession with beauty and cosmetic surgery, in which she played a glamorous writer. Though the film was not a success, Richard Corliss of Time wrote that Streep was the "one reason" to see it, observing that it marked a departure from the dramatic roles she was known to play. Reacting to her string of poorly received films, Streep said: "Audiences are shrinking; as the marketing strategy defines more and more narrowly who they want to reach males from 16 to 25 – it's become a chicken-and-egg syndrome. Which came first? First, they release all these summer movies, then do a demographic survey of who's going to see them."

=== 1990s: Commercial fluctuations ===
Biographer Karen Hollinger described the early 1990s as a downturn in the popularity of Streep's films, attributing this partly to a critical perception that her comedies had been an attempt to convey a lighter image following several serious, but commercially unsuccessful, dramas, and, more significantly, to the lack of options available to an actress in her forties. Streep commented that she had limited her options by her preference to work in Los Angeles, close to her family, a situation that she had anticipated in a 1981 interview when she commented, "By the time an actress hits her mid-forties, no one's interested in her anymore. And if you want to fit a couple of babies into that schedule as well, you've got to pick your parts with great care." At the Screen Actor's Guild National Women's Conference in 1990, Streep keynoted the first national event, emphasizing the decline in women's work opportunities, pay parity, and role models within the film industry. She criticized the film industry for downplaying the importance of women both on screen and off.

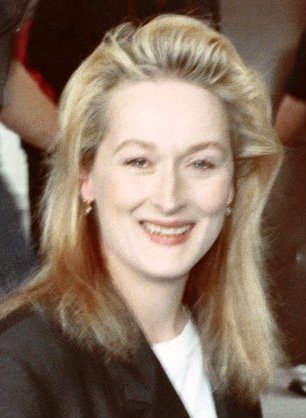
Streep at the 32nd Grammy Awards, 1990

After roles in the comedy-drama Postcards from the Edge (1990), and the comedy-fantasy Defending Your Life (1991), Streep starred with Goldie Hawn in the farcical black comedy, Death Becomes Her (1992), with Bruce Willis as their co-star. Streep persuaded writer David Koepp to re-write several of the scenes, particularly the one in which her character has an affair with a younger man, which she believed was "unrealistically male" in its conception. The seven-month shoot was the longest of Streep's career, during which she got into character by "thinking about being slightly pissed off all of the time". Due to Streep's allergies to numerous cosmetics, special prosthetics had to be designed to age her by ten years to look 54, although Streep believed that they made her look nearer 70. Although it was a commercial success, earning $15.1 million in just five days, Streep's contribution to comedy was generally not taken well by critics. Time's Richard Corliss wrote approvingly of Streep's "wicked-witch routine" but dismissed the film as "She-Devil with a make-over" and one which "hates women". Streep later admitted to having disliked filming the scenes involving heavy special effects, and vowed never to work again on a film with them.

Streep appeared with Jeremy Irons, Glenn Close and Winona Ryder in The House of the Spirits (1993), set in Chile during Augusto Pinochet's dictatorship. The film was not well received by critics. Anthony Lane of The New Yorker wrote: "This is really quite an achievement. It brings together Jeremy Irons, Meryl Streep, Winona Ryder, Antonio Banderas, and Vanessa Redgrave and insures that, without exception, they all give their worst performances ever". The following year, Streep starred in The River Wild, as the mother of children on a whitewater rafting trip who encounter two violent criminals (Kevin Bacon and John C. Reilly) in the wilderness. Though critical reaction was generally mixed, Peter Travers of Rolling Stone found her to be "strong, sassy and looser than she has ever been onscreen".

Streep's most successful film of the decade was the romantic drama The Bridges of Madison County (1995) directed by Clint Eastwood, who adapted the film from Robert James Waller's novel of the same name. It relates the story of Robert Kincaid (Eastwood), a photographer working for National Geographic, who has a love affair with a middle-aged Italian farm wife Francesca (Streep). Though Streep disliked the novel it was based on, she found the script to be a special opportunity for an actress her age. She gained weight for the part and dressed differently from the character in the book to emulate voluptuous Italian film stars such as Sophia Loren. Both Loren and Anna Magnani were an influence in her portrayal, and Streep viewed Pier Paolo Pasolini's Mamma Roma (1962) prior to filming. The film was a box office hit and grossed over $70 million in the United States. The film, unlike the novel, was warmly received by critics. Janet Maslin of The New York Times wrote that Eastwood had managed to create "a moving, elegiac love story at the heart of Mr. Waller's self-congratulatory overkill", while Joe Morgenstern of The Wall Street Journal described it as "one of the most pleasurable films in recent memory". Film critic Karina Longworth claimed it was the role in which Streep became "arguably the first middle-aged actress to be taken seriously by Hollywood as a romantic heroine".

Streep played the estranged sister of Bessie (Diane Keaton), a woman battling leukemia, in Marvin's Room (1996), an adaptation of the play by Scott McPherson. Streep recommended Keaton for the role. Roger Ebert stated that, "Streep and Keaton, in their different styles, find ways to make Lee and Bessie into much more than the expression of their problems." The film was well received, and Streep earned another Golden Globe nomination for her performance.

Streep's performance in ...First Do No Harm (1997) garnered her a second Emmy Award nomination for Outstanding Lead Actress – Miniseries or a Movie. In 1998, Streep first appeared opposite Michael Gambon and Catherine McCormack in Pat O'Connor's Dancing at Lughnasa, another Broadway adaptation, which was entered into the Venice Film Festival in its year of release. Janet Maslin of The New York Times remarked that "Meryl Streep has made many a grand acting gesture in her career, but the way she simply peers out a window in Dancing at Lughnasa ranks with the best. Everything the viewer need know about Kate Mundy, the woman she plays here, is written on that prim, lonely face and its flabbergasted gaze." Later that year, she played a housewife dying of cancer in One True Thing. The film met with positive reviews. Mick LaSalle in the San Francisco Chronicle declared, "After One True Thing, critics who persist in the fiction that Streep is a cold and technical actress will need to get their heads examined. She is so instinctive and natural – so thoroughly in the moment and operating on flights of inspiration – that she's able to give us a woman who's at once wildly idiosyncratic and utterly believable." Los Angeles Times film critic Kenneth Turan noted that her role "is one of the least self-consciously dramatic and surface showy of her career," but she "adds a level of honesty and reality that makes [her performance] one of her most moving".

Streep portrayed Roberta Guaspari in the music drama Music of the Heart (1999). Streep received nominations for an Academy Award, a Golden Globe and a Screen Actors Guild Award for her performance. Roger Ebert wrote:

Meryl Streep is known for her mastery of accents; she may be the most versatile speaker in the movies. Here you might think she has no accent, unless you've heard her real speaking voice; then you realize that Guaspari's speaking style is no less a particular achievement than Streep's other accents. This is not Streep's voice, but someone else's – with a certain flat quality, as if later education and refinement came after a somewhat unsophisticated childhood.

=== 2000s: Career resurgence and stage work ===
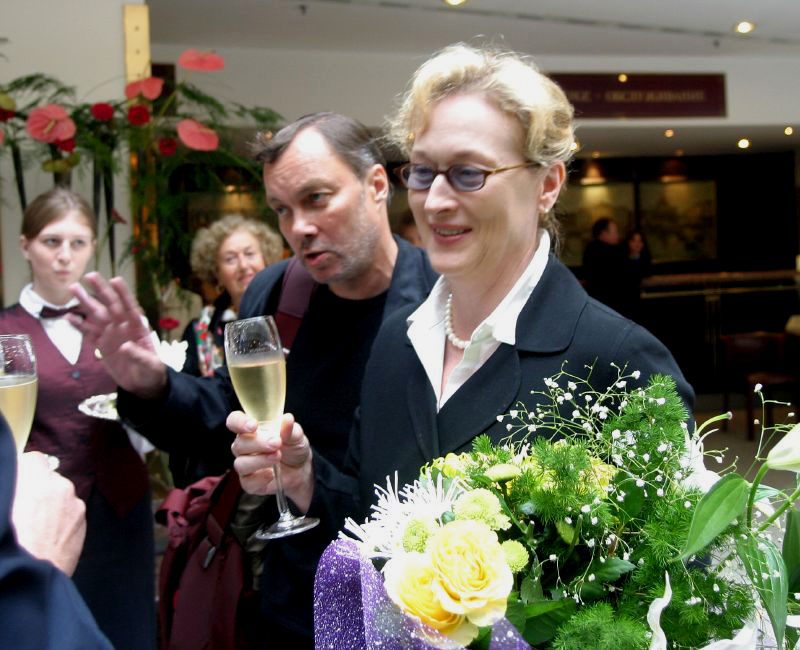
Streep in Saint Petersburg, Russia, in 2004

Streep entered the 2000s with a voice cameo in Steven Spielberg's A.I. Artificial Intelligence (2001), a science fiction film about a childlike android, played by Haley Joel Osment. The same year, Streep co-hosted the annual Nobel Peace Prize Concert with Liam Neeson which was held in Oslo, Norway, on December 11, 2001, in honour of the Nobel Peace Prize laureate, the United Nations and Kofi Annan. In 2001, Streep returned to the stage for the first time in more than twenty years, playing Arkadina in The Public Theater's revival of Anton Chekhov's The Seagull, directed by Mike Nichols and co-starring Kevin Kline, Natalie Portman, John Goodman, Marcia Gay Harden, Stephen Spinella, Debra Monk, Larry Pine and Philip Seymour Hoffman.

The same year, Streep began work on Spike Jonze's comedy-drama Adaptation. (2002), in which she portrayed real-life journalist Susan Orlean. Lauded by critics and viewers alike, the film won Streep her fourth Golden Globe in the Best Supporting Actress category. A. O. Scott in The New York Times considered Streep's portrayal of Orlean to have been "played with impish composure", noting the contrast in her "wittily realized" character with love interest Chris Cooper's "lank-haired, toothless charisma" as the autodidact arrested for poaching rare orchids. Streep appeared alongside Nicole Kidman and Julianne Moore in Stephen Daldry's The Hours (2002), based on the 1999 novel by Michael Cunningham. Focusing on three women of different generations whose lives are interconnected by the novel Mrs. Dalloway by Virginia Woolf, the film was generally well received and won all three leading actresses a Silver Bear for Best Actress.

In 2003, Streep re-united with Mike Nichols to star with Al Pacino and Emma Thompson in the HBO's adaptation of Tony Kushner's six-hour play Angels in America, the story of two couples whose relationships dissolve amidst the backdrop of Reagan era politics. Streep, who was cast in four roles in the miniseries, received her second Emmy Award and fifth Golden Globe for her performance. She appeared in Jonathan Demme's moderately successful remake of The Manchurian Candidate in 2004, co-starring Denzel Washington, playing the role of a woman who is both a U.S. senator and the manipulative, ruthless mother of a vice-presidential candidate. The same year, she played the supporting role of Aunt Josephine in Lemony Snicket's A Series of Unfortunate Events alongside Jim Carrey, based on the first three novels in Snicket's book series. The black comedy received generally favorable reviews from critics, and won the Academy Award for Best Makeup. Streep also narrated the film Monet's Palate. Streep was next cast in the comedy film Prime (2005), directed by Ben Younger. In the film, she played Lisa Metzger, the Jewish psychoanalyst of a divorced and lonesome business-woman, played by Uma Thurman, who enters a relationship with Metzger's 23-year-old son (Bryan Greenberg). A modest mainstream success, it eventually grossed US$67.9 million internationally. Roger Ebert noted how Streep had "that ability to cut through the solemnity of a scene with a zinger that reveals how all human effort is, after all, comic at some level".

In August and September 2006, Streep starred onstage at The Public Theater's production of Mother Courage and Her Children at the Delacorte Theatre in Central Park. The Public Theater production was a new translation by playwright Tony Kushner, with songs in the Weill/Brecht style written by composer Jeanine Tesori; veteran director George C. Wolfe was at the helm. Streep starred alongside Kevin Kline and Austin Pendleton in this three-and-a-half-hour play. Around the same time, Streep, along with Lily Tomlin, portrayed the last two members of what was once a popular family country music act in Robert Altman's final film A Prairie Home Companion (2006). A comedic ensemble piece featuring Lindsay Lohan, Tommy Lee Jones, Kevin Kline and Woody Harrelson, the film revolves around the behind-the-scenes activities at the long-running public radio show of the same name. The film grossed more than US$26 million, the majority of which came from domestic markets.

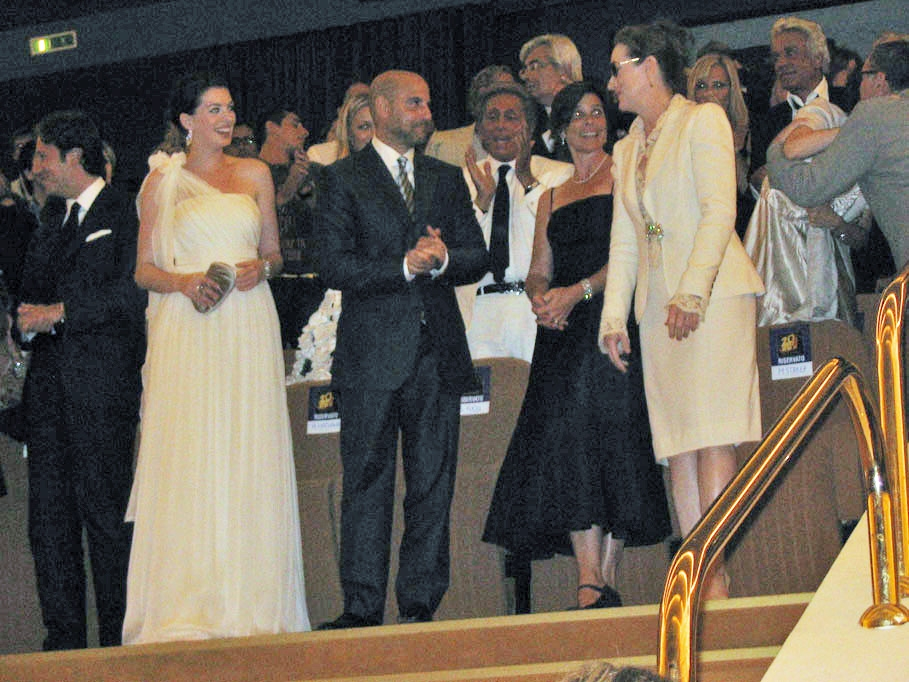
Streep (right) at the Venice premiere of The Devil Wears Prada in 2006

Commercially, Streep fared better with a role in The Devil Wears Prada (also 2006), a loose screen adaptation of Lauren Weisberger's 2003 novel of the same name. Streep portrayed the powerful and demanding Miranda Priestly, fashion magazine editor (and boss of a recent college graduate played by Anne Hathaway). Though the overall film received mixed reviews, her portrayal, of what Ebert calls the "poised and imperious Miranda", drew rave reviews from critics, and earned her many award nominations, including her record-setting 14th Oscar bid, as well as another Golden Globe. On its commercial release, the film became Streep's biggest commercial success to this point, grossing more than US$326.5 million worldwide.

She portrayed a wealthy university patron in Chen Shi-zheng's much-delayed feature drama Dark Matter, a film about a Chinese science graduate student who becomes violent after dealing with academic politics at a U.S. university. Inspired by the events of the 1991 University of Iowa shooting, and initially scheduled for a 2007 release, producers and investors decided to shelve Dark Matter out of respect for the victims of the Virginia Tech shooting in April 2007. The drama received negative to mixed reviews upon its limited 2008 release. Streep played a U.S. government official who investigates an Egyptian foreign national suspected of terrorism in the political thriller Rendition (2007), directed by Gavin Hood. Keen to get involved in a thriller film, Streep welcomed the opportunity to star in a film genre for which she was not usually offered scripts, and immediately signed on to the project. Upon its release, Rendition was less commercially successful, and received mixed reviews.

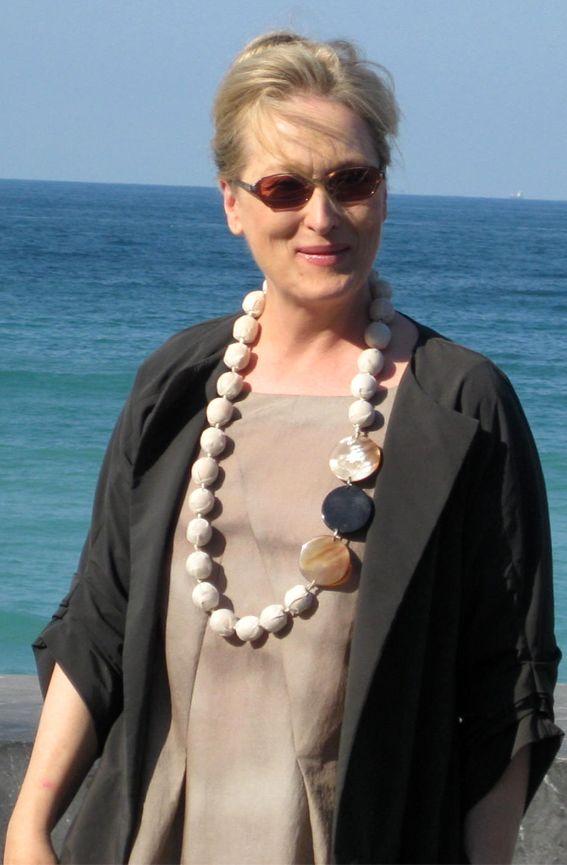
Streep at the 2008 San Sebastián International Film Festival

In this period, Streep had a short role alongside Vanessa Redgrave, Glenn Close, and her eldest daughter Mamie Gummer in Lajos Koltai's drama film Evening (2007), based on the 1998 novel of the same name by Susan Minot. Switching between the present and the past, it tells the story of a bedridden woman, who remembers her tumultuous life in the mid-1950s. The film was released to a lukewarm reaction from critics, who called it "beautifully filmed, but decidedly dull [and] a colossal waste of a talented cast". She had a role in Robert Redford's Lions for Lambs (also 2007), a film about the connection between a platoon of United States soldiers in Afghanistan, a U.S. senator, a reporter, and a California college professor. Like Evening, critics felt that the talent of the cast was wasted, and that it suffered from slow pacing, although one critic announced that Streep positively stood out, being "natural, unforced, quietly powerful", in comparison to Redford's forced performance.

Streep found major commercial success when she starred in Phyllida Lloyd's Mamma Mia! (2008), a film adaptation of the musical of the same name, based on the songs of Swedish pop group ABBA. Co-starring Amanda Seyfried, Pierce Brosnan, Stellan Skarsgård, Colin Firth, Julie Walters, and Christine Baranski, Streep played a single mother and a former girl-group singer, whose daughter (Seyfried), a bride-to-be who never met her father, invites three likely paternal candidates to her wedding on the idyllic Greek island of Skopelos known in the film as Kalokairi. An instant box office success, Mamma Mia! became Streep's highest-grossing film to date, with box office receipts of US$602.6 million, also ranking it first among the highest-grossing musical films. Nominated for another Golden Globe, Streep's performance was generally well received by critics, with Wesley Morris of The Boston Globe commenting: "The greatest actor in American movies has finally become a movie star."

Doubt (also 2008) features Streep with Philip Seymour Hoffman, Amy Adams, and Viola Davis. A drama revolving around the stern principal nun (Streep) of a Bronx Catholic school in 1964 who brings accusations of pedophilia against a popular priest (Hoffman), the film became a moderate box office success, and was hailed by many critics as one of the best films of 2008. The film received five Academy Awards nominations, for its four lead actors and for John Patrick Shanley's script. Ebert, who awarded the film the full four stars, highlighted Streep's caricature of a nun, who "hates all inroads of the modern world", while Kelly Vance of The East Bay Express remarked: "It's thrilling to see a pro like Streep step into an already wildly exaggerated role, and then ramp it up a few notches just for the sheer hell of it. Grim, red-eyed, deathly pale Sister Aloysius may be the scariest nun of all time."

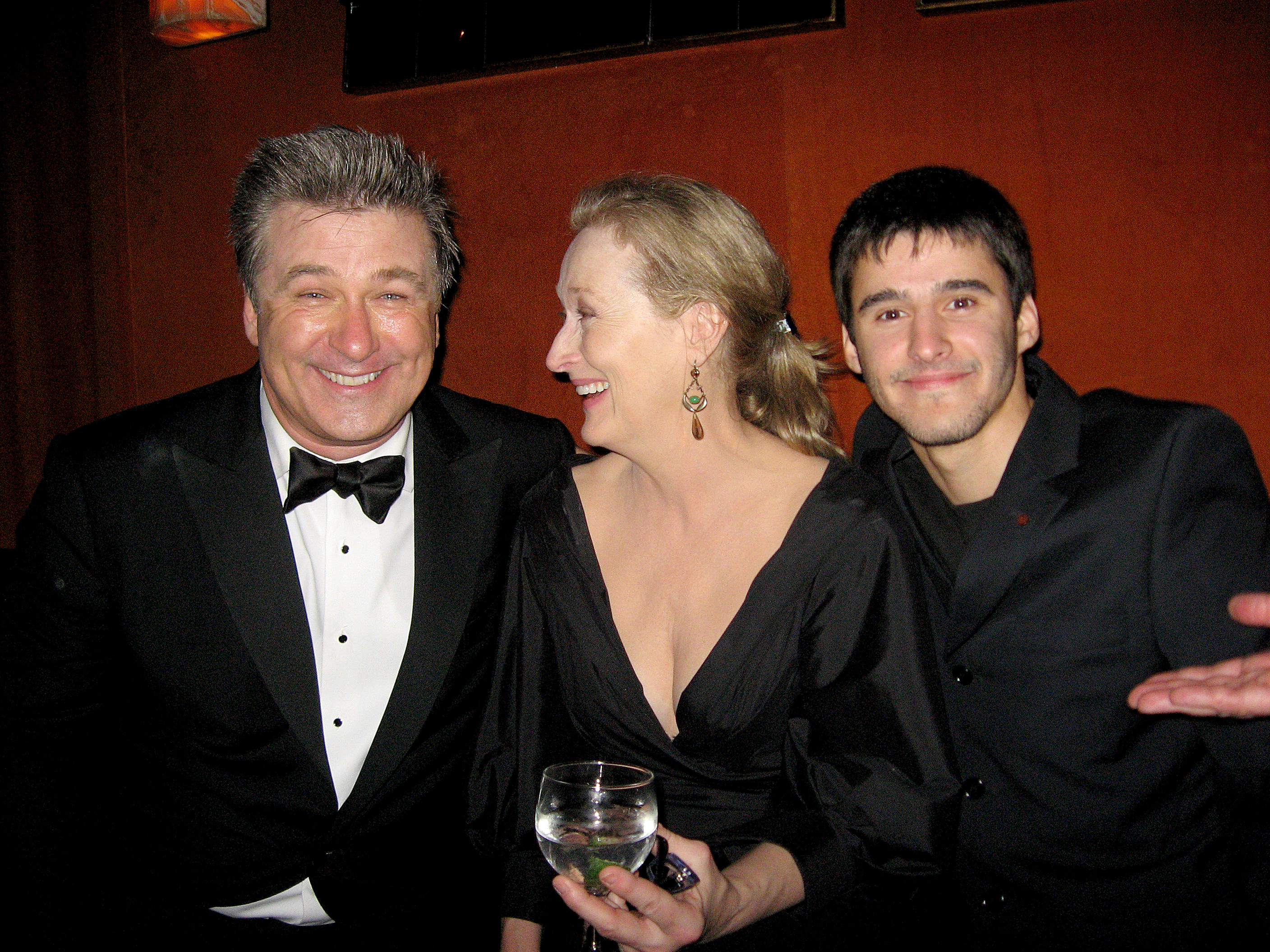
Streep with Alec Baldwin and Josh Wood at the 2009 Screen Actors Guild Awards

In 2009, Streep played chef Julia Child in Nora Ephron's Julie & Julia, co-starring with Stanley Tucci, and again with Amy Adams. (Tucci and Streep had worked together earlier in Devil Wears Prada.) The first major motion picture based on a blog, Julie and Julia contrasts the life of Child in the early years of her culinary career with the life of young New Yorker Julie Powell (Adams), who aspires to cook all 524 recipes in Simone Beck, Louisette Bertholle and Child's cookbook Mastering the Art of French Cooking. In Nancy Meyers' romantic comedy It's Complicated (also 2009), Streep starred with Alec Baldwin and Steve Martin. She received nominations for the Golden Globe Award for Best Actress – Motion Picture Musical or Comedy for both Julie & Julia and It's Complicated; she won the award for Julie & Julia, and later received her 16th Oscar nomination for it. She also lent her voice to Mrs. Felicity Fox in Wes Anderson's stop-motion film Fantastic Mr. Fox.

=== 2010s: Further critical and commercial success ===
Streep re-teamed with Mamma Mia! director Phyllida Lloyd on The Iron Lady (2011), a British biographical film about Margaret Thatcher, which takes a look at the Prime Minister during the Falklands War and her years in retirement. Streep, who attended a session of the House of Commons to see British Members of Parliament (MPs) in action in preparation for her role as Thatcher, called her casting "a daunting and exciting challenge". While the film had a mixed reception, Streep's performance gained rave reviews, earning her Best Actress awards at the Golden Globes and the BAFTAs, as well as her third win at the 84th Academy Awards. Former advisers, friends, and family of Thatcher criticized Streep's portrayal of her as "inaccurate" and "biased". The following year, after Thatcher's death, Streep issued a formal statement describing Thatcher's "hard-nosed fiscal measures" and "hands-off approach to financial regulation", while praising her "personal strength and grit".

Streep re-united with Prada director David Frankel on the set of the romantic comedy-drama film Hope Springs (2012), co-starring Tommy Lee Jones and Steve Carell. Streep and Jones play a middle-aged couple, who attend a week of intensive marriage counseling to try to bring back the intimacy missing in their relationship. Reviews for the film were mostly positive, with critics praising the "mesmerizing performances ... which offer filmgoers some grown-up laughs – and a thoughtful look at mature relationships". In 2013, Streep starred alongside Julia Roberts and Ewan McGregor in the black comedy drama August: Osage County (2013) about a dysfunctional family that re-unites into the familial house when their patriarch suddenly disappears. Based on Tracy Letts's Pulitzer Prize-winning eponymous play, Streep received positive reviews for her portrayal of the family's strong-willed and contentious matriarch, who is suffering from oral cancer and an addiction to narcotics. She was subsequently nominated for another Golden Globe, SAG, and Academy Award.

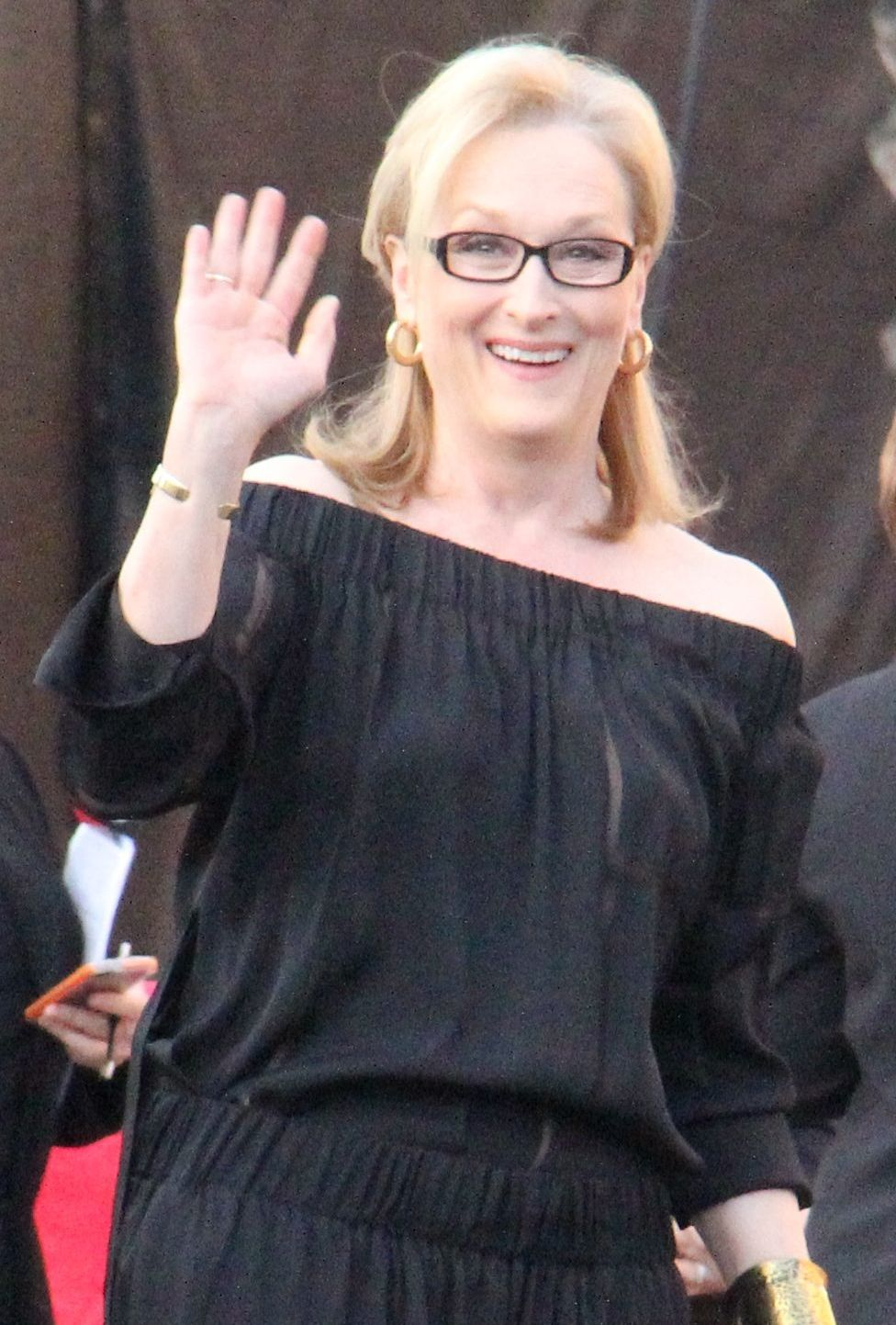
Streep at the 2014 Screen Actors Guild Awards

In 2014's The Giver, a motion picture adaptation of the young adult novel, Streep played a community leader. Set in 2048, the social science fiction film recounts the story of a post-apocalyptic community without war, pain, suffering, differences or choice, where a young boy is chosen to learn the real world. Streep was aware of the book before being offered the role by co-star and producer Jeff Bridges. Upon its release, The Giver was met with generally mixed to negative reviews from critics. Streep also had a small role in the period drama film The Homesman (2014). Set in the 1850s midwest, the film stars Hilary Swank and Tommy Lee Jones as an unusual pair who help three women driven to madness by the frontier to get back East. Streep does not appear until near the end of the film, playing a preacher's wife, who takes the women into care. The Homesman premiered at the 2014 Cannes Film Festival where it garnered largely positive reviews from critics.

Directed by Rob Marshall, Into the Woods (also 2014) is a Disney film adaptation of the Broadway musical with music and lyrics by Stephen Sondheim in which Streep plays a witch. A fantasy genre crossover inspired by the Grimm Brothers' fairy tales, it centers on a childless couple who set out to end a curse placed on them by Streep's vengeful witch. Though the film was dismissed by some critics such as Mark Kermode as "irritating naffness", Streep's performance earned her Academy Award, Golden Globe, SAG, and Critic's Choice Award nominations for Best Supporting Actress. In July 2014, it was announced that Streep would portray Maria Callas in Master Class, but the project was pulled after director Mike Nichols's death in November of the same year.

In 2015, Streep starred in Jonathan Demme's Ricki and the Flash, playing a grocery store checkout worker by day who is a rock musician at night, and who has one last chance to reconnect with her estranged family. Streep learned to play the guitar for the semi-autobiographical drama-comedy film, which again featured Streep with her eldest daughter Mamie Gummer. Reviews of the film were generally mixed. Streep's other film of this time was director Sarah Gavron's period drama Suffragette (also 2015), co-starring Carey Mulligan and Helena Bonham Carter. In the film, she played the small, but pivotal, role of Emmeline Pankhurst, a British political activist and leader of the British suffragette movement who helped women win the right to vote. The film received mostly positive reviews, particularly for the performances of the cast, though its distributor earned criticism that Streep's prominent position within the marketing was misleading.

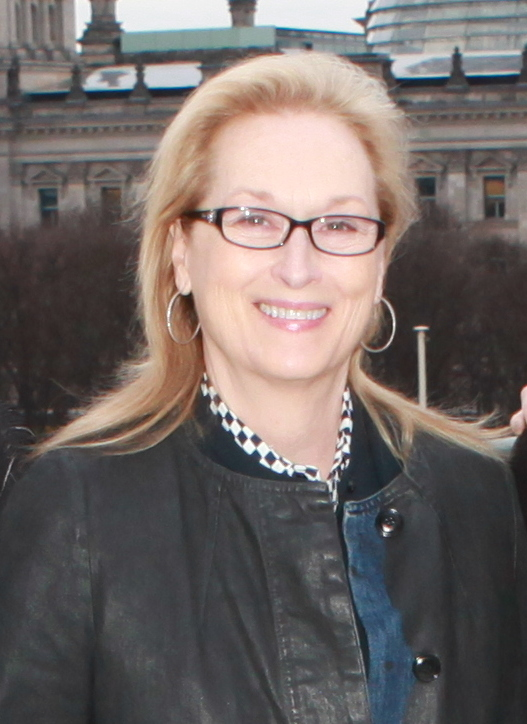
Streep at the Embassy of the United States, Berlin, in 2016

Following the duties of the president at the 66th Berlin International Film Festival in 2016, Streep starred in the Stephen Frears-directed comedy Florence Foster Jenkins (2016), an eponymous biopic about a blithely unaware tone-deaf opera singer who insists upon public performance. Other cast members were Hugh Grant and Simon Helberg. Robbie Collin considered it to be one of her most "human performance" and felt that it was "full of warmth that gives way to heart-pinching pathos". She won the Critics' Choice Movie Award for Best Actress in a Comedy, and received Academy Award, Golden Globe, SAG, and BAFTA nominations.

Streep next starred as the first American female newspaper publisher, Katharine Graham, to Tom Hanks' Ben Bradlee, in Steven Spielberg's political drama The Post (2017), which centers on The Washington Post's publication of the 1971 Pentagon Papers. The film received positive reviews with praise directed to the performances of the two leads. Manohla Dargis wrote that "Streep creates an acutely moving portrait of a woman who in liberating herself helps instigate a revolution". It earned over $177 million against a budget of $50 million. Streep received her 31st Golden Globe nomination and 21st Academy Award nomination for Best Actress.

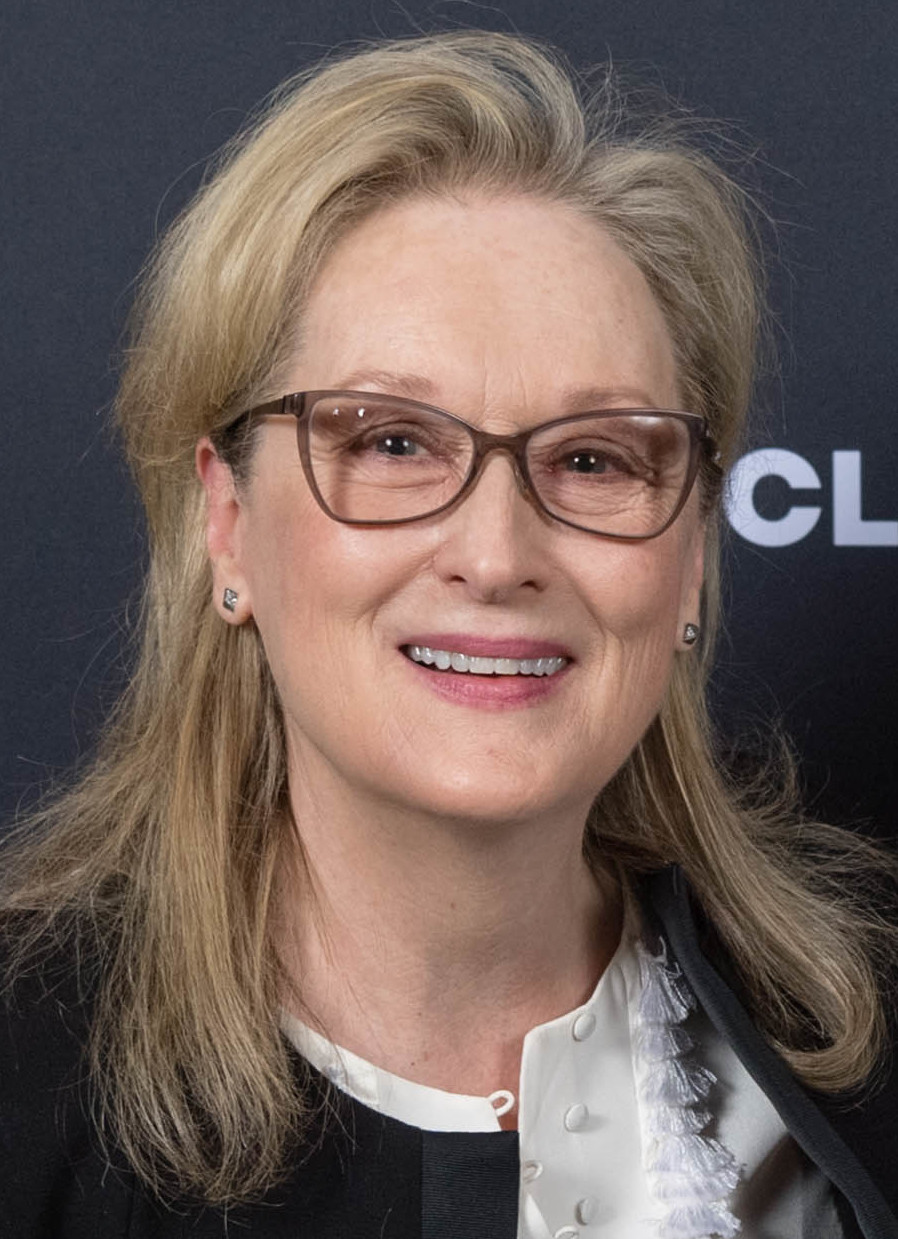
Streep in 2018

In 2018, Streep briefly reprised her role in the musical sequel Mamma Mia! Here We Go Again. She also played a supporting part in Rob Marshall's Mary Poppins Returns, a musical sequel to the 1964 film Mary Poppins starring Emily Blunt in the titular role. Streep next featured in her first main role in a television series by starring in the second season of the HBO drama series Big Little Lies in 2019. She took on the part of Mary Louise Wright, the mother-in-law of Nicole Kidman's character. Liane Moriarty, author of the novel of the same name, on which the first season is based, wrote a 200-page novella that served as the basis for the second season. Moriarty decided to name the new character Mary Louise, after Streep's legal name. Streep subsequently agreed to the part without reading a script for the first time in her career. Writing for the BBC, Caryn James labeled her performance "delicious and wily" and found her to be the "embodiment of a passive-aggressive granny". She received an Emmy nomination for the show.

The same year, Streep then starred in the Steven Soderbergh-directed biographical comedy The Laundromat, about the Panama Papers, opposite Gary Oldman and Antonio Banderas. It was the first movie distributed by Netflix in which Streep starred. She also played Aunt March in Greta Gerwig's Little Women, co-starring with Saoirse Ronan, Emma Watson, Florence Pugh, Timothée Chalamet, and Laura Dern. David Rooney of The Hollywood Reporter praised Streep's performance writing, "Streep is clearly having a ball as the imperious snob who snorts with disapproval...[and] does her best to hide her affection for her nieces behind her narrowed gaze and all-purpose disdain". The film received critical acclaim and grossed over $218 million against its $40 million budget.

=== 2020s: Streaming and theatrical projects ===
In 2020, she voiced a role in the Apple TV+ animated short film Here We Are: Notes for Living on Planet Earth. Streep had leading roles in two films, both released by streaming services. She reunited with Nicole Kidman for Netflix, in Ryan Murphy's The Prom (2020), a film adaptation of the Broadway musical of the same name. That same year she also reunited with director Steven Soderbergh for his HBO Max comedy film Let Them All Talk (2020). Streep starred alongside Dianne Wiest, Candice Bergen, Lucas Hedges, and Gemma Chan. Richard Lawson of Vanity Fair noted, "Streep could, in some senses, be approaching the film as a meta commentary on her own ivied stature as the world's greatest living actor (in some people's estimation, anyway). If that is what's happening, she never betrays her motivations with a wink. It's all played pretty earnestly".

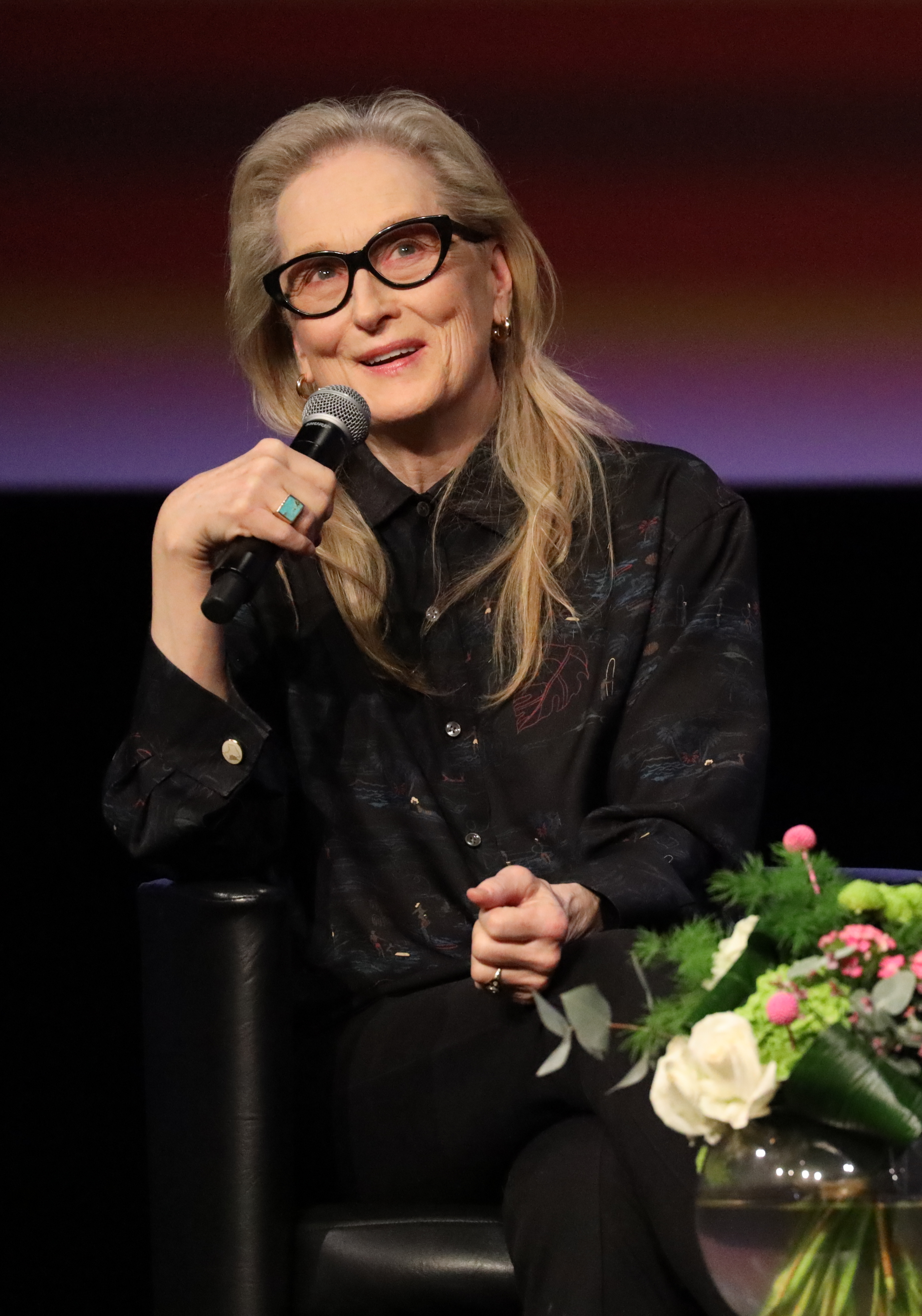
Streep at the 2024 Cannes Film Festival

Streep then starred opposite Leonardo DiCaprio and Jennifer Lawrence in Don't Look Up (2021), directed by Adam McKay for Netflix. Streep played a comical role as the fictional President of the United States who waves off the impending destruction of Earth by an asteroid. In his mixed review, Peter DeBruge of Variety stated she was "clearly having more fun than we are". Streep served as an executive producer on Sell/Buy/Date (2022), directed by Sarah Jones. She acted in the Apple TV+ anthology series Extrapolations (2023). Later that year, she began playing Loretta Durkin, a struggling actress, from the third season of the Hulu comedy series Only Murders in the Building, starring Steve Martin, Martin Short and Selena Gomez. Leila Latif of The Guardian wrote, "Streep, unsurprisingly, plays Loretta beautifully, truly tapping into the agony of a woman who's faced a lifetime of rejection but somehow kept her dream alive". She received Golden Globe and Primetime Emmy Award nominations and won a Critics' Choice Television Award. In 2025, Streep attended the Saturday Night Live 50th Anniversary Special, in which she acted in an alien abduction skit portraying the mother of Colleen Rafferty, played by Kate McKinnon. It marked Streep's first SNL appearance. Streep then voiced Queen Butterfly in the Pixar Animation Studios film Hoppers, which was released on March 6, 2026.

She reprised the role of Miranda Priestly in The Devil Wears Prada 2, which was released on May 1, 2026. It debuted as her highest grossing film in the opening weekend, in both global ($233.6 million) and domestic ($77 million) box office.

==== Upcoming projects ====
On August 18, 2025, it was announced that a biopic on the life and career of musician Joni Mitchell was in the works with Cameron Crowe set to direct the film. Streep has signed on to play Mitchell in present day with Anya Taylor-Joy playing Mitchell in the 1960s and 1970s.

== Other ventures ==
After Streep starred in Mamma Mia!, her rendition of the titular song rose to popularity on the Portuguese music charts, where it peaked at number eight in October 2008. At the 35th People's Choice Awards, her version of "Mamma Mia" won an award for "Favorite Song From A Soundtrack". In 2008, Streep was nominated for a Grammy Award (her fifth nomination) for her work on the Mamma Mia! soundtrack. Streep has narrated numerous audio books, including three by children's book author William Steig: Brae Irene, Spinky Sulks, and The One and Only Shrek!.

Streep is the spokesperson for the National Women's History Museum (NWHM), to which she has made significant donations (including her fee for The Iron Lady, which was $1 million), and hosted numerous events. In 2026, Streep made a seven-figure donation to the NWHM. In recognition of her contribution the NWHM established the Meryl Streep Educator Award "honoring an exceptional educator each year who advances the teaching of women's history and expands access to these vital narratives in classrooms and communities nationwide."

On October 4, 2012, Streep donated $1 million to The Public Theater in honor of both its late founder, Joseph Papp, and her friend, the author Nora Ephron. She also supports Gucci's "Chime for Change" campaign that aims to spread female empowerment.

In 2014, Streep established two scholarships for students at the University of Massachusetts Lowell – the Meryl Streep Endowed Scholarship for English majors, and the Joan Hertzberg Endowed Scholarship (named for Streep's former classmate at Vassar College) for math majors.

In April 2015, it was announced that Streep had funded a screenwriters lab for female screenwriters over forty years old, called the Writers Lab, to be run by New York Women in Film & Television and the collective IRIS. The Lab was the only one of its kind in the world for female screenwriters over forty years old. In 2015, Streep signed an open letter for which One Campaign had been collecting signatures; the letter was addressed to Angela Merkel and Nkosazana Dlamini-Zuma, urging them to focus on women as they served as heads of the G7 in Germany and the AU in South Africa, respectively, in setting development funding priorities. Also in 2015, Streep sent each member of the U.S. Congress a letter supporting the Equal Rights Amendment. Each of her letters was sent with a copy of the book Equal Means Equal: Why the Time for the ERA is Now by Jessica Neuwirth, president of the ERA Coalition.

When asked in a 2015 interview with Time Out if she was a feminist, Streep replied, "I am a humanist, I am for nice easy balance." In March 2016, Streep, among others, signed a letter asking for gender equality throughout the world, in observance of International Women's Day; this was also organized by One Campaign. In 2018, she collaborated with 300 women in Hollywood to set up the Time's Up initiative to protect women from harassment and discrimination.

On April 25, 2017, Streep publicly backed the campaign to free Oleg Sentsov, a Ukrainian filmmaker from Crimea who was subjected to a sham trial by Russia and jailed in Siberia for 20 years in August 2015. She was pictured alongside Ukrainian lawmaker Mustafa Nayyem with a "Free Sentsov" sign in a photograph taken during the PEN America Annual Literary Gala on April 25, at which Sentsov was honoured with a 2017 PEN/Barbey Freedom to Write award.

== Reception and legacy ==
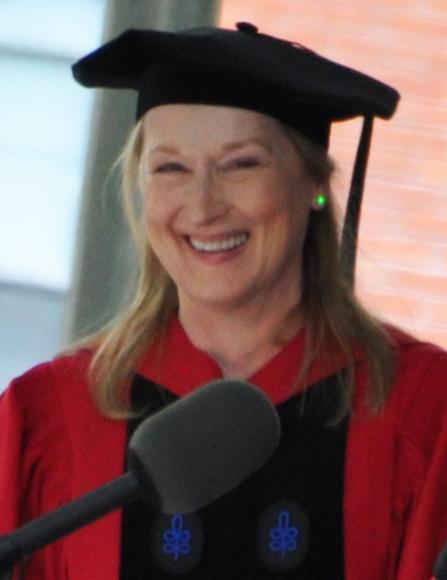
Streep receiving an honorary degree from Harvard University in 2010

In 2004, Streep was awarded the AFI Life Achievement Award by the board of directors of the American Film Institute. In 2011, she received a Kennedy Center Honors, introduced by Tracey Ullman, and speeches by 2009 Kennedy Center Honoree Robert De Niro and 2003 Kennedy Center Honoree Mike Nichols. Those also to honor Streep included, Kevin Kline, Emily Blunt, Stanley Tucci, and Anne Hathaway. The tribute ended with the whole cast who sang "She's My Pal", a play on "He's My Pal" from Ironweed.

In November 2014, President Barack Obama bestowed upon Streep the Presidential Medal of Freedom, the nation's highest civilian honor. The citation reads as follows, "Meryl Streep is one of the most widely known and acclaimed actors in history. Ms. Streep has captured our imaginations with her unparalleled ability to portray a wide range of roles and attract an audience that has only grown over time, portraying characters who embody the full range of the human experience." In January 2017, Viola Davis presented Streep with the Cecil B. DeMille at the Golden Globes. Davis stated to Streep "You make me proud to be an artist". In her acceptance speech, Streep quoted the recently departed Carrie Fisher, saying, "Take your broken heart and make it into art."

Throughout her career, Streep has frequently been described by critics and journalists as the world's greatest living actress. Vanity Fair commented that "it's hard to imagine that there was a time before Meryl Streep was the greatest-living actress". Emma Brockes of The Guardian notes that despite Streep's being "one of the most famous actresses in the world", it is "strangely hard to pin an image on Streep", in a career where she has "laboured to establish herself as an actor whose roots lie in ordinary life". Despite her success, Streep has always been modest about her own acting and achievements in cinema. She has stated that she has no particular method when it comes to acting, learning from the days of her early studies that she cannot articulate her practice. She said in 1987, "I have a smattering of things I've learned from different teachers, but nothing I can put into a valise and open it up and say 'Now, which one would you like?' Nothing I can count on, and that makes it more dangerous. But then, the danger makes it more exciting." She has stated that her ideal director is one who gives her complete artistic control, allowing her to have a degree of improvisation and to learn from her mistakes.

Women are better at acting than men. Why? Because we have to be. If successfully convincing somebody bigger than you of something he doesn't know is a survival skill, this is how women have survived through the millennia. Pretending is not just play. Pretending is imagined possibility. Pretending or acting is a very valuable life skill, and we all do it. All the time.

— Streep on acting

Streep is chameleon-like in her impersonation of characters, "subsuming herself into them, rather than personifying them". Early in her career, Streep was drawn to playing women who were difficult to like and lacked empathy. Streep has stated that many consider her to be a technical actor adding, "I come ready and I don't want to screw around and waste the first 10 takes on adjusting lighting and everybody else getting comfortable". Mike Nichols, who directed Streep in Silkwood, Heartburn, Postcards from the Edge, and Angels in America, praised Streep's ability to transform herself into her characters, remarking that, "In every role, she becomes a totally new human being. As she becomes the person she is portraying, the other performers begin to react to her as if she were that person." He said that directing her is "so much like falling in love that it has the characteristics of a time which you remember as magical, but which is shrouded in mystery". He also noted that Streep's acting ability had a profound impact on her co-stars, and that "one could improve by 1000% purely by watching her". Streep has at times infused a feminist point of view into her character portrayals; film critic Molly Haskell has stated, "None of her heroines are feminist, strictly speaking. Yet, they uncannily embody various crosscurrents of experience in the last twenty years, as women have re-defined themselves against the background of the women's movement".

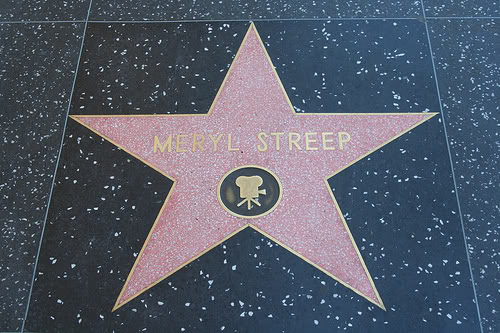
Streep's star on the Hollywood Walk of Fame

Streep is well known for her ability to imitate a wide range of accents – from Danish in Out of Africa (1985) to British Received Pronunciation in The French Lieutenant's Woman (1981), Plenty (1985), and The Iron Lady (2011); Italian in The Bridges of Madison County (1995); a southern American accent in The Seduction of Joe Tynan (1979); a Minnesota accent in A Prairie Home Companion (2006); Upstate New York in Ironweed (1987); and a heavy Bronx accent in Doubt (2008). Streep has stated that she grew up listening to artists such as Barbra Streisand, the Beatles, and Bob Dylan, and she learned a lot about how to use her voice, her "instrument", by listening to Barbra Streisand's albums. In the film Evil Angels (1988, released in the U.S. as A Cry in the Dark), in which she portrays a New Zealand transplant to Australia, Streep developed a hybrid of Australian and New Zealand English. Her performance received the Australian Film Institute Award for Best Actress in a Leading Role, as well as Best Actress at the Cannes Film Festival, and the New York Film Critics Circle Award for Best Actress.

For her role in the film Sophie's Choice (1982), Streep spoke both English and German with a Polish accent, as well as Polish itself. In The Iron Lady, she reproduced the vocal style of Margaret Thatcher from the time before Thatcher became Britain's Prime Minister, and after she had taken elocution lessons to change her pitch, pronunciation, and delivery. Streep has commented that using accents as part of her acting is a technique she views as an obvious requirement in her portrayal of a character. When questioned in Belfast as to how she reproduces different accents, Streep replied in a reportedly "perfect" Belfast accent: "I listen."

== Activism and advocacy ==
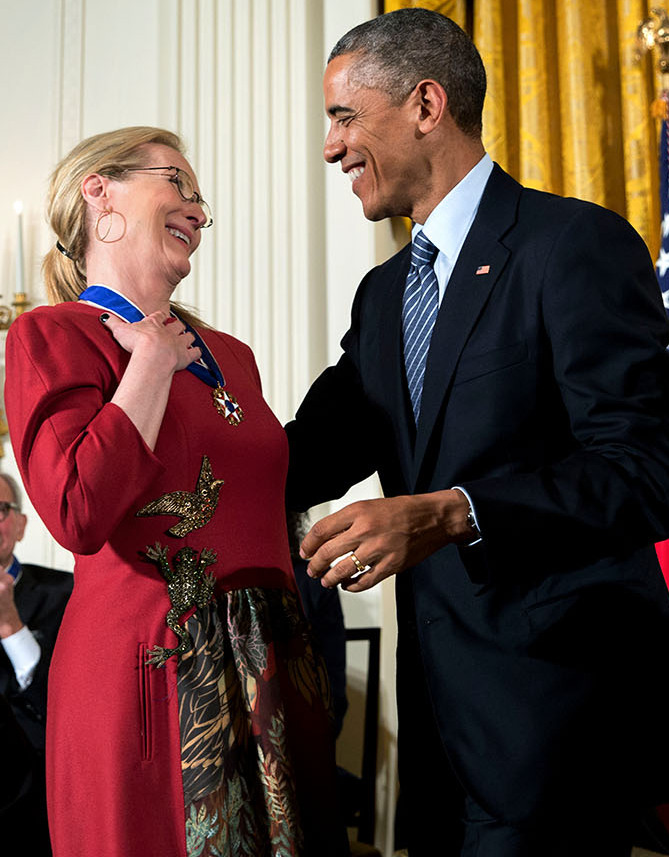
Streep receiving the Presidential Medal of Freedom from Barack Obama in 2014

Politically, Streep has described herself as part of "the left". She gave a speech at the 2016 Democratic National Convention in support of presidential nominee Hillary Clinton. In January 2017, during her acceptance speech on receiving the Cecil B. DeMille Award for Lifetime Achievement at the 74th Golden Globe Awards, she criticized the conduct of then-President-elect Donald Trump, referring to him as "the person asking to sit in the most respected seat in our country." She specifically condemned his public mocking of disabled reporter Serge F. Kovaleski as an abuse of "privilege, power, and the capacity to fight back." Streep argued that such an "instinct to humiliate" from a powerful figure "filters down into everybody's life" and "gives permission for other people to do the same thing." The speech drew widespread media attention and became a focal point of national political discourse.

Streep has also focused her advocacy on systemic industry issues and labor rights. While promoting Suffragette in 2015, she challenged the male gaze in film criticism, citing a ratio of 760 men to 168 women among Rotten Tomatoes contributors. She argued that this imbalance creates a skewed consensus that adversely affects the commercial performance and perceived authenticity of female-driven narratives. In June 2023, she was among over 300 high-profile members of SAG-AFTRA who signed a letter threatening to strike to secure a "transformative" deal protecting performers' craft and likenesses from the unregulated rise of artificial intelligence.

== Personal life ==
=== Relationships and family ===
Streep met actor John Cazale in 1976, when they were both in a production of William Shakespeare's Measure for Measure at the Delacorte Theater. They were living together when he was diagnosed with lung cancer in 1977; Streep cared for him until he died in March 1978. Streep said of his death:

I didn't get over it. I don't want to get over it. No matter what you do, the pain is always there in some recess of your mind, and it affects everything that happens afterwards. I think you can assimilate the pain and go on without making an obsession of it.

Streep married sculptor Don Gummer on September 30, 1978, six months after Cazale's death. They have four children: musician Henry Wolfe Gummer (born 1979), and actresses Mary Willa "Mamie" Gummer (born 1983), Grace Jane Gummer (born 1986), and Louisa Jacobson Gummer (born 1991). In 1985, the family moved into a $1.8-million private estate in Connecticut and lived there until they bought a $3-million mansion in Brentwood, Los Angeles, in 1990. They later moved back to Connecticut. In 2023, it was reported that Streep and Gummer had been separated for more than six years. They were publicly last seen together at the 90th Academy Awards in 2018.

Streep is the godmother of Billie Lourd, daughter of the late actress Carrie Fisher, who was a close friend to Streep. Fisher wrote the screenplay for Streep's 1990 film Postcards from the Edge, based on Fisher's book of the same name.

=== Beliefs ===
When asked if religion plays a part in her life in 2009, Streep replied: "I follow no doctrine. I don't belong to a church or a temple or a synagogue or an ashram." In an interview in 2008, she alluded to her lack of religious belief when she said:

So, I've always been really, deeply interested because I think I can understand the solace that's available in the whole construct of religion. But I really don't believe in the power of prayer, or things would have been avoided that have happened, that are awful. So, it's a horrible position as an intelligent, emotional, yearning human being to sit outside of the available comfort there. But I just can't go there.

When asked where she draws consolation in the face of aging and death, Streep responded:

Consolation? I'm not sure I have it. I have a belief, I guess, in the power of the aggregate human attempt – the best of ourselves. In love and hope and optimism – you know, the magic things that seem inexplicable. Why we are the way we are. I do have a sense of trying to make things better. Where does that come from?

== Acting credits and awards ==
One of the most prolific actresses of screen and stage since her career's inception in the late 1970s, Streep's most acclaimed and highest-grossing films, according to the review aggregator site Rotten Tomatoes, include Julia (1977), The Deer Hunter (1978), Kramer vs. Kramer (1979), The French Lieutenant's Woman (1981), Sophie's Choice (1982), Silkwood (1983), A Cry in the Dark (1988), (Note: The film was released worldwide as A Cry in the Dark, except in Australia and New Zealand, where it was released under the title Evil Angels.) Postcards from the Edge (1990), Defending Your Life (1991), The Bridges of Madison County (1995), Marvin's Room (1996), Adaptation (2002), The Devil Wears Prada (2007), Mamma Mia! (2008), Fantastic Mr. Fox (2009), The Homesman (2014), Florence Foster Jenkins (2016), Little Women (2019), and Let Them All Talk (2020). Her television projects include the miniseries Holocaust (1978), the television film ...First Do No Harm (1997), the miniseries Angels in America (2003), and the drama series Big Little Lies (2019). Her stage roles include the Broadway theatre productions A Memory of Two Mondays, 27 Wagons Full of Cotton (both 1976) and The Cherry Orchard (1977), as well as multiple plays at the Delacorte Theater.

Streep has been recognized by the Academy of Motion Picture Arts and Sciences (AMPAS) for the following performances:

Awards	Category	Work	Win/nomination
51st Academy Awards	Best Actress in a Supporting Role	The Deer Hunter (1978)	Nominated
52nd Academy Awards	Best Actress in a Supporting Role	Kramer vs. Kramer (1979)	Won
54th Academy Awards	Best Actress in a Leading Role	The French Lieutenant's Woman (1981)	Nominated
55th Academy Awards	Best Actress in a Leading Role	Sophie's Choice (1982)	Won
56th Academy Awards	Best Actress in a Leading Role	Silkwood (1983)	Nominated
58th Academy Awards	Best Actress in a Leading Role	Out of Africa (1985)	Nominated
60th Academy Awards	Best Actress in a Leading Role	Ironweed (1987)	Nominated
61st Academy Awards	Best Actress in a Leading Role	A Cry in the Dark (1988)	Nominated
63rd Academy Awards	Best Actress in a Leading Role	Postcards from the Edge (1990)	Nominated
68th Academy Awards	Best Actress in a Leading Role	The Bridges of Madison County (1995)	Nominated
71st Academy Awards	Best Actress in a Leading Role	One True Thing (1998)	Nominated
72nd Academy Awards	Best Actress in a Leading Role	Music of the Heart (1999)	Nominated
75th Academy Awards	Best Actress in a Supporting Role	Adaptation (2002)	Nominated
79th Academy Awards	Best Actress in a Leading Role	The Devil Wears Prada (2006)	Nominated
81st Academy Awards	Best Actress in a Leading Role	Doubt (2008)	Nominated
82nd Academy Awards	Best Actress in a Leading Role	Julie & Julia (2009)	Nominated
84th Academy Awards	Best Actress in a Leading Role	The Iron Lady (2011)	Won
86th Academy Awards	Best Actress in a Leading Role	August: Osage County (2013)	Nominated
87th Academy Awards	Best Actress in a Supporting Role	Into the Woods (2014)	Nominated
89th Academy Awards	Best Actress in a Leading Role	Florence Foster Jenkins (2016)	Nominated
90th Academy Awards	Best Actress in a Leading Role	The Post (2017)	Nominated

These nominations make Streep the most Academy Award-nominated performer in history, with 21 in total (17 for Best Actress and four for Best Supporting Actress), as well as one of only 13 performers to win an Oscar in both acting categories and one of only four performers to win three Academy Awards across the two acting categories (with Ingrid Bergman, Jack Nicholson, and Sean Penn being the others to achieve this feat).

She has also received six Grammy Award nominations, six Primetime Emmy Award nominations (with three wins plus a Children's and Family Emmy Award win), and one Tony Award nomination. Streep is one of few performers to be nominated for the Triple Crown of Acting and the Emmy, Grammy, Oscar, and Tony (EGOT) award. Her other accolades include nine Golden Globe Awards (as well as the honorary Cecil B. DeMille Award), two BAFTA Awards for Best Actress in a Leading Role (for The French Lieutenant's Woman and The Iron Lady), a Silver Bear and Honorary Golden Bear in Berlin International Film Festival, Best Actress, Honorary Palme d'Or in Cannes Film Festival and two Screen Actors Guild Awards.

== Discography ==
=== Albums ===
- The Velveteen Rabbit (1984)
- A Prairie Home Companion (2006)
- Mamma Mia! The Movie Soundtrack (2008)
- Into the Woods (2014)
- Florence Foster Jenkins (2016)
- Mamma Mia! Here We Go Again: The Movie Soundtrack (2018)
- Mary Poppins Returns (2018)
- The Prom (2020)
- Dream Requiem (2025)

=== Singles ===
Year	Title	Peak chart positions					Album
Year	Title	U.S. Hot 100	Digital Song Sales	Bubbling Under Hot 100	Lyric Find U.S.	Lyric Find Global	Album
2008	"Mamma Mia" (Meryl Streep)	99	48	14	—	—	Mamma Mia! (Soundtrack)
2018	"My Love, My Life" (Amanda Seyfried, Lily James and Meryl Streep)	—	—	—	—	20	Mamma Mia! Here We Go Again (Soundtrack)
2018	"Super Trouper" (Cast)	—	—	—	3	—	Mamma Mia! Here We Go Again (Soundtrack)
2018	"The Day Before You Came" (Meryl Streep)	—	—	—	—	—	Mamma Mia! Here We Go Again (Soundtrack)
"—" denotes a recording that did not chart.

== See also ==
- List of Academy Award records
- List of actors with two or more Academy Awards in acting categories
- List of oldest and youngest Academy Award winners and nominees
- List of actors with Hollywood Walk of Fame motion picture stars
- List of wax figures displayed at Madame Tussauds museums
- List of Yale University people

== Sources ==
- Abramowitz, Rachel (2002). Is That a Gun in Your Pocket?: The Truth about Female Power in Hollywood. Random House. p. 414. ISBN 978-0-375-75869-0. "Streep ultimately moved back to Connecticut."
- Allison, Scott T.; Goethals, George R. (July 4, 2013). True Heroes: An Influence Taxonomy of 100 Exceptional Individuals. Routledge. p. 414. ISBN 978-1-136-23273-2.
- Allon, Yoram; Cullen, Del; Patterson, Hannah (2001). Contemporary British and Irish film directors: a wallflower critical guide. Wallflower. p. 255. ISBN 9781903364222.
- Caparrós Lera, José María (2001). El cine de fin de milenio (1999–2000) (in Spanish). Ediciones Rialp. ISBN 978-84-321-3344-2.
- Devine, Jeremy M. (1999). Vietnam at 24 Frames a Second: A Critical and Thematic Analysis of Over 400 Films about the Vietnam War. University of Texas Press. ISBN 978-0-292-71601-8.
- Diller, Vivian (February 15, 2010). Face It: What Women Really Feel as Their Looks Change. Hay House, Inc. ISBN 978-1-4019-2781-3.
- Ebert, Roger; Bordwell, David (2008). Awake in the Dark: The Best of Roger Ebert. University of Chicago Press. ISBN 978-0-226-18200-1.
- Ebert, Roger (October 2010). Awake in the Dark: The Best of Roger Ebert – Forty Years of Reviews, Essays, and Interviews. ReadHowYouWant.com. ISBN 978-1-4596-0597-8.
- Eberwein, Robert (May 17, 2010). Acting for America: Movie Stars of the 1980s. Rutgers University Press. ISBN 978-0-8135-5113-5.
- Elliott, Peter; Manning, Ned; Saltau, Margaret; Surbey, Elizabeth (December 19, 2011). Drama Reloaded. Cambridge University Press. ISBN 978-0-521-18312-3.
- Fisher, James (June 1, 2011). Historical Dictionary of Contemporary American Theater: 1930–2010. Scarecrow Press. ISBN 978-0-8108-7950-8.
- Gussow, Mel (1998). Theatre on the Edge: New Visions, New Voices. Applause. ISBN 978-1-55783-311-2.
- Haskell, Molly (May–June 2008). "Finding Herself: The Prime of Meryl Streep". Film Comment. Archived from the original on March 9, 2009.
- Hollinger, Karen (2006). "Chapter 4: 'Magic Meryl': Meryl Streep". The Actress: Hollywood Acting and the Female Star. New York: Routledge. ISBN 978-0-415-97792-0. OCLC 62281405.
- Kidder, David S.; Oppenheim, Noah D. (October 14, 2008). The Intellectual Devotional Modern Culture: Revive Your Mind, Complete Your Education, and Converse Confidently with the Culturati. Rodale. ISBN 978-1-60529-793-4.
- Lenburg, Jeff (May 1, 2001). Dustin Hoffman: Hollywood's Antihero. iUniverse. ISBN 978-0-595-18270-1.
- Lloyd, Ann; Robinson, David (October 28, 1988). Seventy years at the movies. Crescent Books. p. 452. ISBN 978-0-517-66213-7.
- Longworth, Karina (2013). Meryl Streep: Anatomy of an Actor. Phaidon Press. ISBN 978-0-7148-6669-7.
- Louis Gates, Henry Jr. (July 6, 2010). Faces of America: How 12 Extraordinary People Discovered their Pasts. NYU Press. ISBN 978-0-8147-3265-6.
- Magill, Frank Northen (1995). Great lives from history: American women series. Salem Press. ISBN 978-0-89356-897-9.
- McGilligan, Patrick (1999). Clint: The Life and Legend. London: HarperCollins. ISBN 978-0-00-638354-3.
- Mitchell, Deborah C. (July 26, 2001). Diane Keaton: Artist and Icon. McFarland. ISBN 978-0-7864-1082-8.
- Morency, Philip (2012). On the Aisle, Volume 2: Film Reviews by Philip Morency. Dorrance Publishing. ISBN 978-1-4349-7709-0.
- Napoleon, Davi (1991). Chelsea on the Edge: The Adventures of an American Theater. Ames, Iowa: Iowa State University Press. ISBN 978-0-8138-1713-2. OCLC 23211514. Includes discussion of Streep's performance in Robert Kalfin's production of Happy End at the Chelsea Theater and on Broadway
- Palmer, R. Barton; Bray, William Robert (December 5, 2013). Modern British Drama on Screen. Cambridge University Press. ISBN 978-1-107-00101-5.
- Potts, Kimberly (September 1, 2011). George Clooney: The Last Great Movie Star Revised and Updated Edition. Applause Theatre & Cinema Books. ISBN 978-1-55783-915-2.
- Pfaff, Eugene E.; Emerson, Mark (December 1, 1987). Meryl Streep: a critical biography. McFarland & Co. ISBN 978-0-89950-287-8.
- Probst, Ernst (2012). Meryl Streep – Der Star auf der Bühne, der Leinwand und dem Bildschirm. GRIN Verlag. ISBN 978-3-656-19423-1.
- Sterling, Mary E. (June 1, 1997). The 20th Century. Teacher Created Resources. ISBN 978-1-57690-100-7.
- Waldo, Theo (July 2006). Celebrities and Their Culinary Creations: Autographed Photos, Biographies, Trivia, and Recipes. iUniverse. ISBN 978-0-595-39753-2.
- Speed, F. Maurice; Wilson, James Cameron (1989). Film Review. W. H. Allen. ISBN 9781852271664.
