= The Screens =

Play by the French dramatist Jean Genet

The Screens (French: Les Paravents) is a 1961 play by the French dramatist Jean Genet. The play's controversial theme of French colonialism, at a time of unrest in French colonial Algeria, caused riots when the work was first staged in Paris in 1966. The work is presented in a stylised, non-narrative form of short individual episodes, linked by the character Saïd, an outcast from society who betrays the rebels.

The play's first few productions all used abridged versions, beginning with its world premiere under Hans Lietzau's direction in Berlin in May 1961. Its first complete performance was staged in Stockholm in 1964, two years before Roger Blin directed its French premiere in Paris.

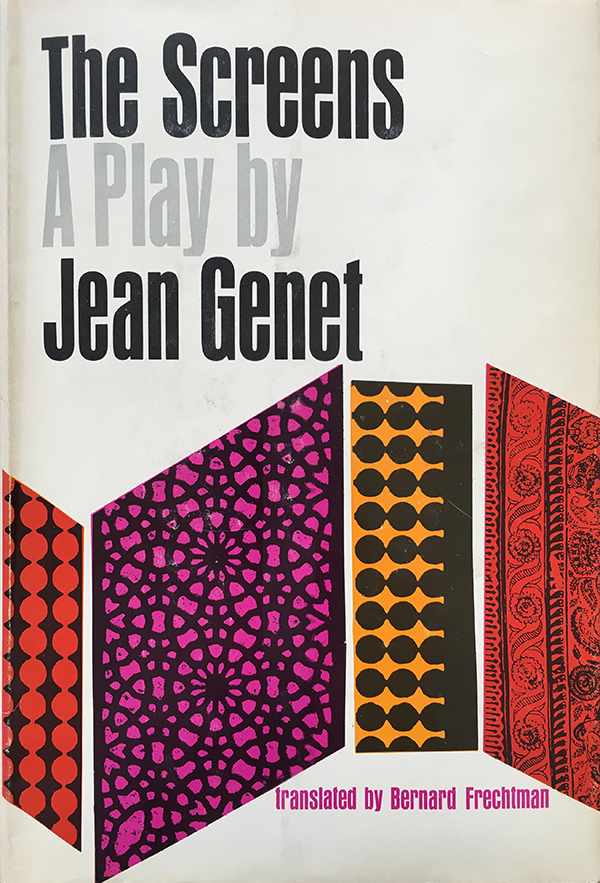
Cover design by Roy Kuhlman for the first English language edition, published by Grove Press, New York (1962).

== Theme ==
Genet was writing the piece as a war of independence was being conducted in French Algeria. The work has no narrative structure, but comprises a series of 17 individual scenes depicting insurrection (in an unspecified Arab land) against a mindless and blundering colonial power. Although the occupying army is not identified as specifically French (nor is the action intended to depict the then-recent Algerian insurgence: the French conquest of Algeria in the 1840s is also referenced), when the play was first performed in France, at the eminent Odéon theatre, Paris, in 1966 it was seen as a provocative insult to national prestige and caused serious protest demonstrations.

The "screens" of the title are metaphors: in one sense, for example, they stand for on-screen television news reports filtering out the ugly realities, both physical and political, of war. They also represent symbolically the concealment of "the dynamic between appearance and power" by colonial governments. But they are also real stage properties, mounted on rubber wheels and manipulated, as part of the action, by a visible stagehand. As the play develops, the actors use the screens to make drawings of the scenes being performed.

Although The Screens has no narrative structure, continuity is provided by the protagonist, Saïd: a poor, outcast Arab who betrays the rebels to the authorities and who appears, or is discussed, in every scene.

== Textual history ==
Genet began writing the play in 1955 and continued to develop it over the following few years, completing a first version in June 1958. He re-wrote the play further while in Greece towards the end of 1959. Marc Barbezat's publishing company L'Arbalèt published it in February 1961, after which Genet re-wrote the play again. It was first published in English by Grove Press, New York in 1962 (translated by Bernard Frechtman), with Faber & Faber publishing the UK edition the following year. In 1976, Genet published a second, revised version, which appears in the French edition of his Complete Works.

== Production history ==
The play premièred in an abridged German version in May 1961 at the Schlosspark-Theater in Berlin, which Hans Lietzau directed. A slightly revised version of the problematic German translation used in Berlin was staged by Leon Epp two years later at the Volkstheater in Vienna in 1963. Epp's interpretation emphasised the political conflict between the French and Algerians in the play.

In 1964 in London, Peter Brook staged two-thirds of the play (its first twelve scenes, in a performance that lasted for two-and-a-half hours) at the Donmar Rehearsal Rooms as part of his experimental "Theatre of Cruelty" season with the Royal Shakespeare Company; he abandoned plans to stage the complete text, partly due to dissatisfaction with Bernard Frechtman's translation. There were no public performances: the rehearsal space was fitted out with seating to form an improvised theatre and the audience for the fully staged and costumed final version was by invitation only.

The play's first complete performance was directed by Per Verner Carlsson at the Stockholm City Theatre in 1964. Its five-hour-long production required six months of rehearsal preparation.

Roger Blin directed the play's French première at the Odéon theatre in Paris, opening on 21 April 1966. Genet became closely involved in rehearsals and published a series of letters to Blin about the theatre, the play, and the progress of its production. André Acquart designed the sets and costumes, providing, via three collapsible platforms, four levels which 27 gliding screens divided into different playing areas, with "sumptuous and theatrical" costumes and make-up. Madeleine Renaud played Warda, Jean-Louis Barrault played the Mouth, María Casares played the Mother, and Amidou played Saïd. Disruptions of performances began on 30 April, when theatre seats, a smoke bomb and other items were thrown onto the stage. Members of the audience grappled with the cast and a stage hand was injured. Disorderly street protests, organised by a French war veterans' association, and further interruptions from audiences, continued until the run of the play ended on 7 May.

Blin directed a German production in Essen in November 1967.

Minos Volanakis directed the play's US première at the Chelsea Theater Center in Brooklyn in New York 1971. Two ceilings had to be removed to accommodate the multi-level performance space. Patrice Chéreau directed a production at the Théâtre Nanterre-Amandiers in Nanterre, near Paris, in 1983. In 1989 Joanne Akalaitis directed Paul Schmidt's translation at the Guthrie Theater in Minneapolis, with Jesse Borrego as Said, and music by Philip Glass and Foday Musa Suso.

An abridgement by Howard Brenton, with a running time of three hours, was mounted by Walter Donohue, the RSC literary editor, at the Bristol Old Vic studio in 1973.

== Sources ==
- Dichy, Albert. 1993. "Chronology." In White (1993, xiii-xxxv).
- Frechtman, Bernard, trans. 1963. The Screens. By Jean Genet. London: Faber, 1987. ISBN 0-571-14875-1.
- Lavery, Carl, Clare Finburgh, and Maria Shevtsova, eds. 2006. Jean Genet: Performance and Politics. Baisingstoke and New York: Palgrave Macmillan. ISBN 1-4039-9480-3.
- Napoleon, Davi (1991). Chelsea on the edge: the adventures of an American theater (1st ed.). Ames: Iowa State University Press. ISBN 0-8138-1713-7.
- Oswald, Laura. 1989. Jean Genet and the Semiotics of Performance. Advances in Semiotics ser. Bloomington and Indianapolis: Indiana UP. ISBN 0-253-33152-8.
- Plunka, Gene A. (1992). The rites of passage of Jean Genet: the art and aesthetics of risk taking. Cranbury, NJ: Associated University Presses. ISBN 0-8386-3461-3.
- Savona, Jeannette L. 1983. Jean Genet. Grove Press Modern Dramatists ser. New York: Grove P. ISBN 0-394-62045-3.
- Seaver, Richard, trans. 1972. Reflections on the Theatre and Other Writings. By Jean Genet. London: Faber. ISBN 0-571-09104-0.
- Styan, J. L. 1981. Symbolism, Surrealism and the Absurd. Vol. 2 of Modern Drama in Theory and Practice. Cambridge: Cambridge UP. ISBN 0-521-29629-3.
- White, Edmund. 1993. Genet. Corrected edition. London: Picador, 1994. ISBN 0-330-30622-7.
