= Hans Lietzau =

German theatre director, actor and producer

Hans Lietzau (2 September 1913 – 30 November 1991) was a German theatre director, actor, and producer. He was born in Berlin, Germany. In 1953 he directed Friedrich Schiller's The Robbers, with Ernst Schröder as Karl Moor. From 1969 to 1970 he was the theatre manager of the Deutsches Schauspielhaus in Hamburg. He directed the German première of the French dramatist Jean Genet's play The Balcony in 1959 and the world première of his play The Screens in 1961, both of which played at the Schlosspark-Theater in Berlin.

== Sources ==
- Dichy, Albert. 1993. "Chronology." In White (1993, xiii-xxxv).
- Savona, Jeannette L. 1983. Jean Genet. Grove Press Modern Dramatists ser. New York: Grove P. ISBN 0-394-62045-3.
- White, Edmund. 1993. Genet. Corrected edition. London: Picador, 1994. ISBN 0-330-30622-7.
