= Chelsea on the Edge =

1991 book by Davi Napoleon

- Author: Davi Napoleon
- Subject: Chelsea Theater Center
- Publication date: 1991

Chelsea on the Edge: The Adventures of an American Theater (1991) is a book by Davi Napoleon about the onstage triumphs and the offstage turmoil at the Chelsea Theater Center of Brooklyn. It includes biographies of the three co-directors, Robert Kalfin, Michael David, and Burl Hash, and anecdotes about behind-the-scenes activities at the Chelsea.

It is also a history of the funding crisis for the arts in America. It explores the theater's socioeconomic milieu in the 1970s. There are stories about attempts to censor the arts and describing increasing anti-arts sentiment in this country.

The book features a foreword by Broadway director and producer Harold Prince. Prince discusses the problems of maintaining an art theater in a commercial society.

It is written in the style of a novel, even though it is a non-fiction work. The model for the book is Voltaire's Candide.

This book was one of a handful on the forefront of the field of creative non-fiction. Three years after its publication, in 1994, the Creative Nonfiction Foundation was established. The author reports that when she submitted a draft of the work as a doctoral dissertation, she was asked to rewrite it because the creative nonfiction approach had not yet been accepted in the academic community. According to her report, members of her dissertation committee said that while it was thorough and accurate, they felt they were reading a novel; they asked her to make changes in the style so that it no longer met the criteria of creative nonfiction. She did so in order to get her doctorate, but submitted the earlier draft to publishers. The chapter titles, written in the style of Voltaire's 'Candide' (listed below), were particularly controversial.

The Chelsea Theater Center was founded in 1965 and closed in 1986. It was in residence at the Brooklyn Academy of Music from 1968 to 1978. Before and after that time, it worked in theaters in Manhattan, mainly the Westside Theater.

Glenn Close, Frank Langella, Christopher Lloyd and Meryl Streep were among the actors who worked at the Chelsea. Directors included Des McAnuff, Hal Prince, John Hirsch, and Alan Schneider.

In 1965, when Robert Kalfin founded the Chelsea, there were few nonprofit theaters in New York. During the next ten years, new theaters opened, funding sources decreased, and costs rose. Many nonprofit theaters started to do conventional work that would attract audiences. Kalfin and his partners, David and Hash, continued to do innovative work.

Critics often said that the Chelsea stretched the boundaries of theater. Spectators subscribed to seasons before they knew what the Chelsea would produce the following year. On the other hand, there were many clashes behind the scenes.

== Chapter titles ==
1 Wherein Robert Kalfin uses his salary to pay for Chelsea's first off-Broadway contract production in order to attract media attention and funding and thereby loses his partners and his space.

2 How Chelsea finds an ideal, inexpensive space in a major cultural institution which rarely attracts Manhattan audiences and where agents don't send performers to audition.

3 Wherein Chelsea's empathic Caucasian director discovers exciting Black plays and gives militant performers a forum for their views, and how this results in a major triumph for the young theater, an international tour which the actors abandon in Zurich.

4 In which Chelsea mounts three major productions, moves two shows off-Broadway for unlimited runs, is featured on the front page of the Arts and Leisure section of The New York Times and can't get funding to finish the season. Again.

5 How Chelsea soars on borrowed wings.

6 Wherein Chelsea creates a Manhattan annex to house Brooklyn successes. How it opens shows, books shows, and rents spaces to other producers at the Westside Theater while continuing to move Brooklyn productions to inappropriate, overpriced rental houses.

7 In which commercial interests rally for art while artists sabotage a revolutionary production. Chelsea wins major awards for best off-Broadway and best Broadway show of the season but doesn't make any money. Audiences, theater artists, and critics take note, while funding sources make note of the growing deficit.

8 How Kalfin defends art from an experimental playwright, a Tony-nominated actress, a Hollywood star, his partners, his board, and a tribe of Indians. While backstage tensions grow, Macheath hangs.

9 Wherein Chelsea condemns the prince and aborts the family, parts three and four.

10 How a monster loses its heads.

11 Wherein we continue Chelsea, the story of a house.

12 How Chelsea cancels a season in order to pay its debts and cannot secure subsequent funding because it has not been producing plays. Our story reaches a happy end, of course.

== Comments ==
"I have vivid memories of Bob Kalfin. His laughter, enthusiasm, and intensity. He made us all feel special and a part of something important...This book is interesting to me because it explores group dynamics...How does one maintain an organization that is created out of the passion and spontaneity and chemistry of certain key individuals?" Glenn Close

"A brightly written, thoroughly absorbing account of one of the most innovative theatrical companies of the last five decades. Clashing ideals, opposing personalities, economic hazards and withal superb and original productions are all part of Davi Napoleon's narrative and make up a beguiling chapter of our theatrical history." Thomas Lask, book reviewer The New York Times.

"Bob Kalfin is a unique man and Chelsea on the Edge is a fascinating account of the unique theater he created. I doubt we will ever see the like of such a theater again." Frank Langella

"I believe this book documents a tragedy. It is a metaphor for the change in the priorities of our society. It follows a diminishing curve of moral responsibility emphasized by the government's unwillingness to acknowledge the place of art in the quality of our lives...They tell me that it's only cyclical, that times will change, that the worship of Mammon will give way to daydreaming, impracticality, naiveté, idealism. Perhaps they're right. After all; there once was a Group Theatre; there once a Mercury Theatre; and there once was the Chelsea." Hal Prince, from the foreword
