= Robert Kalfin =

American stage director and producer (1933–2022)

Robert Zangwill Kalfin (April 22, 1933 – September 20, 2022) was an American stage director and producer who has worked on and off Broadway and at regional theaters throughout the country. He was a former artistic director of the Cincinnati Playhouse in the Park and the founder/artistic director of The Chelsea Theater Center.

== Biography ==
Robert Zangwill Kalfin was born in 1933 to a Jewish couple of Russian descent. Alfred Kalfin was a cabinetmaker in England until shortly after his 18th birthday, when he moved to the United States and went into real estate. Hilda Kalfin taught kindergarten. Robert has a younger sister, Mrs. Eleanor Royte.

The Kalfins shared a respect for the arts, particularly music, and they provided piano lessons and visits to concerts and opera. Kalfin's maternal grandmother wrote and recited poetry, worked with amateur theater groups, and loved to sing and folk dance.

Kalfin attended Alfred University, where he majored in psychology and became involved with the drama club. He received an MFA from the Yale School of Drama in 1957.

== Career ==
Although Kalfin has worked as a freelance director on and off Broadway, he is best known as the founder/artistic director of the Chelsea Theater Center.

In the early 1960s, New York's commercial Off-Broadway was ending its golden years. There were very few not-for-profit theaters in New York, but funding was becoming available, both from the government and private corporations. Kalfin had long dreamed of starting his own theater.

Kalfin wanted to develop a non-profit theater whose work was as professional and polished as the most heavily backed commercial productions and as daring as commercial Off-Broadway had been in earlier days, an institution that resembled the great European subsidized theaters. With George Bari, who had been a stage manager, and David Long, who had been a company manager, he founded the Chelsea Theater Center in the Chelsea neighborhood in Manhattan in 1965.

Kalfin produced his first season in St Peter's, an Episcopal Church, with a large adjoining Parish Hall that had been converted into a gymnasium. The Chelsea later moved to the Church of the Holy Apostles. Both were in lower Manhattan. After conflicts at each church, the Chelsea became the resident theater of the Brooklyn Academy of Music, from 1968 to 1978.

With the move, Kalfin acquired two new partners. Michael David had studied theater administration at Yale; he currently produces on Broadway as a partner in Dodger Theatricals. Burl Hash had studied stagecraft at Yale and could find imaginative ways to construct scenery on the theater's tight budget.

In Brooklyn, Kalfin's theater developed a loyal audience and won raves from critics. During these ten years, however, new theaters opened, funding sources decreased, and costs rose. Many non-profit theaters became cautious. Kalfin and his partners continued to do cutting-edge work.

When black separatism threatened integration attempts in the late 60s, these three white producers staged some of the first black militant plays. When women began declaring independence from male-run institutions, these men produced feminist plays. Chelsea asked Jewish audiences to appreciate a play showing the humanity of a Nazi sympathizer, invited young audiences to understand the tribulations of old age, and gave seniors a close view of youth culture. Believing that theater reflects "shared universal experiences," Kalfin routinely put artists from different cultural and aesthetic backgrounds on the same project.

Glenn Close, Frank Langella, Christopher Lloyd, and Meryl Streep were among the artists who worked for minimum salaries to be part of the Chelsea experience. In 1973, Broadway director/producer Hal Prince came to Brooklyn to stage the revival of Candide (operetta), which had been a Broadway flop. The audience sat inside, under, and around parts of the Candide set. When the show returned to Broadway, the producers gutted the theater to recreate the Chelsea's environmental set, designed by Eugene Lee.

Critics often said Kalfin and his colleagues stretched the boundaries of theater. Spectators subscribed to seasons before they knew what plays the Chelsea producers would do.

In 1978, Kalfin responded to a growing financial crisis by moving the Chelsea to Manhattan, where it took up residence in the Westside Arts Theater, and later the New Federal Theater. It folded in 1986.

Kalfin has continued to direct at regional, Off-Broadway, and Broadway theaters.

Kalfin's life and work are documented in Chelsea on the Edge: The Adventures of an American Theater, a book by Davi Napoleon. The book puts the Chelsea in the context of American society, mainstream and counter-cultural, during the 1960s and 1970s and is the story of how the funding crisis in the arts impacted theater. It has gotten a following within the theater community both because it is one of the first in-depth studies of regional theater and because of its dramatic structure and novelistic narrative.

"Bob Kalfin is a unique man and Chelsea on the Edge is a fascinating account of the unique theatre he created," said Frank Langella. Glenn Close commented that the book interested her because it explores group dynamics and attempted to answer the question: "How does one maintain an organization that is created out of the passion and spontaneity and chemistry of certain key individuals?" Harold Prince wrote the foreword to the book.

Kalfin died September 20, 2022. Davi Napoleon talked to some of the celebrities who appreciated him and offers her own tribute in American Theatre

== Productions Directed ==
- "The Good Soldier Schweik," 1963, Off-Broadway
- "Five Days" by Henry Zeiger, 1965, Off-Broadway
- "One of Us Has Been Ignited" and "The Furthermost Finger of Filmore" by Jerome Max, 1966, Off-Broadway
- "Junebug Graduates Tonight" by Archie Shepp, 1966, Off-Broadway
- "My Friend Weissman is Back" by Robert Bonnard, 1968, Off-Broadway
- "Christophe" by John Gay, 1968, Off-Broadway
- "The Judas Applause," by Gary Munn, 1969, Off-Broadway
- "Things to Hear, Things to See," book and lyrics by Steve Brown, music by Clay Boland, 1969, Off-Broadway
- "The Universal Nigger" by Gordon Porterfield, 1970, Off-Broadway
- "Tarot" by Joe McCord, 1970, Off-Broadway
- "Kaddish" by Alan Ginsberg, 1972, Off-Broadway
- "Sunset" by Isaac Babel, 1972, Off-Broadway
- "Total Eclipse" by Christopher Hampton, 1974, Off-Broadway
- "Yentl the Yeshiva Boy," by Isaac Bashevis Singer, adapted by Leah Napolin, 1975 Off-Broadway; 1975, Broadway
- "Polly" by John Gay, adapted by Kalfin, 1975, Off-Broadway
- "The Prince of Homburg" by Heinrich von Kleist, 1977. Kalfin directed this the following year for the PBS series, Theater in America. Available on DVD. With Frank Langella as the prince.
- "Happy End" Elisabeth Hauptmann, adapted by Michael Feingold, lyrics by Bertolt Brecht, music by Kurt Weill, 1977 Off-Broadway; 1980 Broadway. With Meryl Streep and Christopher Lloyd in starring roles.
- "Old Man Joseph and his Family" by Romulus Linney, 1978, Off-Broadway
- "Strider: The Story of a Horse" by Mark Rozovsky, adapted from Leo Tolstoy's story, English stage version by Kalfin and Steve Brown, music by Rozovsky, S. Vetking, and Norman Berman. 1979, Off-Broadway; 1980 Broadway
- "Hijinks!: A Musical Entertainment" by Robert Kalfin, Steve Brown, and John McKinney; Based on an idea by William Bolcom, David Brooks, Robert Kalfin and Arnold Weinstein. 1981, Off-Broadway
- "Shanghai Gesture" by John Colton. 2009. Off-Broadway.

== Sources ==
- Napoleon, Davi. Chelsea on the Edge: The Adventures of an American Theater. This tells the story of Robert Kalfin's career before founding the Chelsea Theater Center and documents the entire history of his theater. Iowa State University Press. ISBN 0-8138-1713-7, 1991.
