= Chelsea Theater Center =

Theater company in Manhattan, New York, US

Coordinates: 40.76700°N 73.98779°W

- Founded: 1965
- Founder: Robert Kalfin
- Dissolved: 1984
- Type: Not-for-profit theatre company
- Location: New York City, New York, United States

The Chelsea Theater Center was a not-for-profit theater company founded in 1965 by Robert Kalfin, a graduate of the Yale School of Drama. It opened its doors in a church in the Chelsea district of Manhattan, then moved to the Brooklyn Academy of Music in 1968, where it was in residence for ten years.

== History ==
Kalfin, the artistic producer, wanted to do the kind of work that had marked commercial off-Broadway in its prime but which, as a result of escalating production costs, could no longer realize a profit. By 1969, he was working with two new partners, also Yale graduates, Michael David, executive producer, and Burl Hash, production manager. They made it possible for him to realize the work he envisioned.

In the 1970s, the Chelsea produced plays that were unfamiliar to most spectators, even to many theater professionals. These included unusual European classics, new plays, and major works by well-known playwrights that were too complex and expensive for most non-profit theaters and too limited in audience appeal for most commercial producers.

For instance, the Chelsea staged the first uncut production of Jean Genet's seven-hour long The Screens and the first New York production of Peter Handke's Kaspar. The theater introduced New York audiences to the works of England's new generation of Royal Court Theatre playwrights, including Edward Bond, Christopher Hampton, David Storey and Heathcote Williams It unearthed works that had been lost to contemporary audiences, such as Kleist's The Prince of Homburg; Witkiewitz's surrealistic plays, The Crazy Locomotive and The Water Hen; John Gay's The Beggar's Opera and Polly; and Isaac Babel's Sunset. .

With Kaddish, a play based on a screenplay inspired by a poem by Allen Ginsberg, the Chelsea transformed two other genres into a multi-media theatrical event. With Yentl the Yeshiva Boy, it metamorphized a short story by Isaac Singer into a powerful dramatic production. Then with Candide, it integrated staples of commercial musical theater with experimental environmental staging. The Chelsea was well-regarded by theatre critics. Some performers left Broadway shows to appear on the Chelsea's stage in Brooklyn, and well-known artists such as Frank Langella, Meryl Streep and Hal Prince were anxious to work at the Chelesea. . Others who worked at the Chelsea early in their careers would become well known, including Glenn Close, Brent Spiner and Des McAnuff.

As described in Davi Napoleon's chronicle, Chelsea on the Edge: The Adventures of an American Theater, actors were extremely loyal to the Chelsea. The entire company of Strider, the Story of a Horse (based on a short story by Leo Tolstoy) petitioned Actors' Equity Association to permit it to rehearse without remuneration when the Chelsea had no money to continue production; in a rare move, the union agreed.

Eventually, funding sources for the non-profit theater decreased radically and the Chelsea could not adjust. The theater moved out of Brooklyn, attempting to find a wider audience in Manhattan, but it eventually met with defeat. In the process, they opened the off-Broadway Westside Theatre. The company folded in 1984.
