= Minos Volanakis =

Minos Volanakis (Greek: Μίνως Βολανάκης; 1925 or 1926, Athens – 15 November 1999, Athens) was a Greek theatre director and translator.

== Work ==
He studied with Karolos Koun, for whom he translated American plays into Greek language, and first made his name for his translations of the dramas of his friend Jean Genet, as well as for productions of Samuel Beckett's Waiting for Godot and Aristophanes' Lysistrata at the Athens Festival. In protest against the government, he left Greece in 1966 for England, where he became an associate director at the Oxford Playhouse. His productions there included Genet's The Maids (1963-4) and The Balcony (1967), and Jean Giraudoux's Madwoman of Chaillot.

He provided the translation into English of Euripides' Iphigeneia at Aulis for a production at the Circle in the Square Theatre in New York in 1967, which Michael Cacoyannis directed. He directed a production of Euripides' The Bacchae at the Lyceum Theater in New York in 1968 and the US première of Genet's The Screens in 1971. In 1973 he directed Euripides' Medea at the Circle in the Square Theatre in New York, which opened on January 17.

Volanakis served twice as the artistic director of the National Theatre of Northern Greece (1974 – 1977 & 1986 – 1989). In 1984 he directed a production of Sophocles' Oedipus Rex for the National Theatre of Greece, which subsequently transferred to the Vivian Beaumont Theater on Broadway (opening on July 17 of that year).

== Sources ==
- Anonymous (November 20, 1999). "Minos Volanakis, Greek Translator And Director, 74". The New York Times.
- Chapman, Don. 2008. Oxford Playhouse: High and Low Drama in a University City. Hatfield: U of Hertfordshire P. ISBN 1-902806-87-5.
- White, Edmund. 1993. Genet. Corrected edition. London: Picador, 1994. ISBN 0-330-30622-7.
