= Michael David (producer) =

Michael David is a Broadway producer, the co-founder of and a partner in Dodger Theatricals. His productions on Broadway include Jersey Boys, Matilda The Musical, The Farnsworth Invention, The Secret Garden, Into the Woods, and the revival of The Music Man.

Prior to his work with Dodger Theatricals, he was the executive director of the Chelsea Theater Center of Brooklyn.
