= Davi Napoleon =

American theater historian (born 1946)

Davi Napoleon also known as Davida Skurnick and Davida Napoleon, is an American theater historian and critic as well as a freelance feature writer. She is a contributor to Live Design, a monthly magazine about entertainment design and designers. She is an expert on the not-for-profit theater in America and author of Chelsea on the Edge: The Adventures of an American Theater. This book is a study of the economic changes in the American not-for-profit theater and the impact of these on the art produced. She has written on social and political issues as well.

== Education and teaching ==
Napoleon did her undergraduate work in the College of Literature, Science and the Arts at the University of Michigan in Ann Arbor. She earned a BA in psychology while studying playwriting with Kenneth Thorpe Rowe, then did a master's degree at Michigan in early childhood education. She went on to New York University, and graduated with an MA in drama and a Ph.D. in drama (which became the department of performance studies by the time she finished her dissertation).

In the summer of 1977, Napoleon honed her critical skills at the Eugene O'Neill Theater Center's National Critics Institute in Waterford, CT, which she attended on a National Endowment for the Arts grant.

Napoleon taught at Albion College in Albion, MI (theater) and Eastern Michigan University (journalism and dramatic literature). She has directed plays at Albion College, Washtenaw Community College in Michigan, and at small theaters in Michigan and New York.

== Journalism and contributions to theater history ==
Napoleon has written extensively about the history and issues surrounding the not-for-profit theater in America. Her book about Robert Kalfin and the Chelsea Theater Center is an in-depth history of the life of a theater in the 1960s and 1970s. Chelsea on the Edge: The Adventures of an American Theater (1991) describes on- and off-stage dramas, detailing internal conflicts when a theater that was the darling of critics and audiences was forced to close because of changes in funding to the arts. Hal Prince wrote the foreword to the book that found a readership among working artists both because it is one of the first complex studies of regional theater and because of its dramatic structure and narrative.

She has also written many articles about producer/critic Robert Brustein. Some of her letters and manuscripts are included in the Robert Brustein archive at Boston University.

She interviewed critic John Simon for The Paris Review. This interview was cited in Simon's New York Times obituary.

She wrote a column about theater education called Schoolbiz for four years for TheaterWeek magazine and has been a contributing editor for Theater Crafts, which became Theatre Crafts International, then Entertainment Design, then Live Design. She has also written for American Theatre, American Film, InTheatre, Playbill, ScriptWriter News, Stages and assorted general interest magazines. These include children's magazines, teen magazines Seventeen and others, and a range of general magazines, such as New York magazine, McCall's, and Weight Watchers. She was a stringer for the Detroit Free Press and for the Ann Arbor News in the 1980s. She was the theater reviewer for the Ann Arbor News. From 1986 to 1988 and wrote a theater column for The Faster Times, which was an online newspaper published by Sam Apple. She has written many articles for publications issued by the University of Michigan, and occasionally for publications from other universities that include Michigan State University and Albion College. She has written for local publications in Ann Arbor, including the Ann Arbor Observer and the Ann Arbor District Library's blog, Pulp.

== Playwriting ==
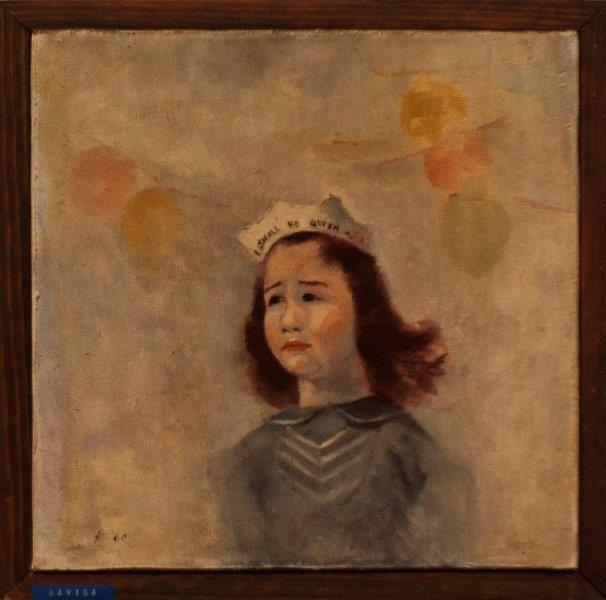

Napoleon has written several plays, including Four's Company, produced at the Greenwich Mews Theatre in New York City in 1974. She was awarded two University of Michigan Hopwood Awards in 1965 and 1966 for plays she wrote as an undergraduate. She later served as a judge for this creative writing contest. She has participated in and led panels on playwriting.

== Personal life ==
She was born in New York City to Jack Skurnick, a musicologist, and Fay Kleinman, a painter. She is married to software engineer Gregory Napoleon. They have two sons, one of whom is the noted jazz guitarist Randy Napoleon, and two grandchildren.
