= Scott Carter =

Scott Carter may refer to:

- Scott Carter (Australia rugby league), Australian rugby league footballer who played in the 1980s and 1990s
- Scott Carter (sports administrator), New Zealand sports administrator
- Scott William Carter, American fiction writer
