= The White Angel (1943 film) =

1943 film

- Spanish film poster
- Directed by: Giulio Antamoro; Federico Sinibaldi; Ettore Giannini
- Written by: Sergio Pugliese; Enrico Ribulsi; Ruggero Rindi (novel); Federico Sinibaldi
- Produced by: Gustavo Lombardo
- Starring: Emma Gramatica; Filippo Scelzo; Beatrice Mancini
- Cinematography: Antonio Marzari
- Edited by: Achille Pisanelli
- Music by: Giuseppe Becce
- Production company: Titanus
- Distributed by: Titanus Distribuzione
- Release date: 8 March 1943
- Running time: 85 minutes
- Country: Italy
- Language: Italian

The White Angel (Italian: L'angelo bianco) is a 1943 Italian drama film directed by Giulio Antamoro, Federico Sinibaldi and Ettore Giannini and starring Emma Gramatica, Filippo Scelzo and Beatrice Mancini. It was shot at the Farnesina Studios of Titanus in Rome. The film's sets were designed by the art director Angelo Zagame. It was adapted from the novel I figli di nessuno by Ruggero Rindi, previously made into a 1921 silent film and later into a 1951 film of the same title.

== Plot ==
Count Guido Carani, an aristocrat burdened by family expectations, falls in love with Maria, a woman of humble origins. Their relationship produces a child, but the scandal threatens to disgrace his noble family. Under pressure from his domineering mother, Guido abandons Maria and the infant to preserve his family's reputation.

Years later, consumed by remorse and loneliness, Guido attempts to rebuild his life but remains haunted by guilt. Maria, having entered a convent after being cast out, becomes known as the “white angel” for her compassion and charity toward the poor and suffering. When Guido encounters Lina, a young woman who resembles Maria, he is forced to confront the moral weight of his past decisions.

Through a series of emotional revelations, Guido learns that Lina is, in fact, his lost daughter. The discovery brings him to a moment of spiritual reckoning, guided by Maria's forgiveness and faith. The film concludes with Guido finding redemption and moral peace, symbolized by Maria's final act of compassion before her death.

The story reflects the era's fascination with religious melodrama, combining themes of guilt, sacrifice, and divine mercy within a moral framework typical of early 1940s Italian cinema.

== Production and style ==
The White Angel was the final film directed by Giulio Antamoro, whose career began in the silent era with works such as The Adventures of Pinocchio (1911). After completing this production, he retired from filmmaking.

The film revisits themes from the 1921 drama I figli di nessuno, transforming its story of guilt and redemption into a more spiritual and moral allegory, in keeping with the cultural climate of early-1940s Italian cinema.

Production took place at the Titanus Farnesina Studios in Rome during the early months of 1943, shortly before wartime restrictions and bombing halted much of the city's film activity. Contemporary accounts describe the film as one of the last Titanus features completed before the end of the Fascist era.

Stylistically, the film combines conventional sound-era dialogue scenes with visual sequences reminiscent of silent cinema, employing dissolves, symbolic lighting, and extended long takes. Scholars have noted that Antamoro deliberately revived these techniques to express inner emotion visually rather than through dialogue.

Released in March 1943, The White Angel occupies a transitional place between the moral melodramas of the late Fascist period and the socially grounded neorealist cinema that followed the war. Critics have since regarded it as an early example of the religious melodrama genre that would resurface in post-war Italian popular cinema.

== Cast ==
- Emma Gramatica as Countess Carani
- Enzo Biliotti as Count Guido Carani
- Leda Gloria as Maria
- Mariella Lotti as Lina
- Luigi Pavese as Don Paolo
- Cesare Fantoni as Doctor Ferretti
- Pina Piovani as Sister Beatrice

== Legacy ==
Although largely forgotten after the war, the film has been re-evaluated by Italian film historians as a precursor to the post-war melodrama trend. Retrospective screenings by the Cineteca di Bologna have noted its hybrid style, bridging silent-era expressionism and early sound-era sentimentality.
