= Iervolino =

Iervolino or Jervolino is an Italian surname, which literally means "from Eboli" (Jevule in Neapolitan dialect) - Eboli is a town in the province of Salerno, Campania. Notable people with the surname include:

- Andrea Iervolino (born 1987), Italian-Canadian film producer, entrepreneur and businessman
- Angelo Raffaele Jervolino (1890–1985), Italian politician
- Rosa Russo Iervolino (born 1936), Italian politician
- Walther Jervolino (1944–2012), Italian painter and artist.
