= Pinocchio (1967 film) =

East German film

- Theatrical release poster
- Directed by: Walter Beck; Ron Merk (English version)
- Written by: Walter Beck and Margot Beichler
- Based on: The Adventures of Pinocchio by Carlo Collodi
- Produced by: Ron Merk
- Cinematography: Wolfgang Braumann and Gunter Haubold
- Music by: Gerhard Wohlgemuth
- Production company: DEFA
- Release date: 1967
- Country: East Germany
- Language: German

Pinocchio (German: Turlis Abenteuer) is a color East German film produced by studio DEFA (Deutsche Film-Aktiengesellschaft) and directed by Walter Beck. It was released on November 3, 1967, with an English version released in the US in February 1969. The film was based on the 1883 Italian novel The Adventures Of Pinocchio, by Carlo Collodi and closely reflects the original book. Except for the talking cricket who did not appear in the film, and this was the first adaptation where Pinocchio went back to the land of toys to free the children from the land of toys and rebel against it to prevent it from turning them into donkeys.

The film is mainly live action but features Pinocchio played by a marionette with strings and the fox and cat or the children who are transformed into donkeys are dressed in costumes and with sets as if they are on stage. The American version maintains most of the original DEFA film, but changes out the songs for new English-language ones.

This was the first DEFA film to feature a mix of both real actors and marionettes. The film's puppets were designed and played by the Spejbl and Hurvínek Marionette Theatre from Prague. The film's songs were sung by Roswitha Trexler and Manfred Krug, who also each voiced a character in the film.

== Plot ==
Papa Gepetto, a master carpenter, creates a wooden puppet which he names Pinocchio. Through the course of the story, the puppet begins to act lifelike, develops a mind of his own, and wishes to be a real boy. He even goes to school with real children, until he spots a puppet theater and wishes to go in but doesn't have the money. Then Mirzilla The fox and Eusebius the cat came up and offer him three pennies for the school book, to which Pinocchio reluctantly agrees. But Pinocchio got into trouble when he interrupted the puppet show as the puppet master Arturo confronts him because he was furious. after getting to know each other they had a decent conversation, but when Pinocchio mentions about his father geppetto, which Arturo responds that he and him were best friends and he made all of the marionette's for Arturo's show which Arturo generously gives Pinocchio five gold coins for him and his father to have, but while into the conversation the fox and the cat eavesdropped and decided to make a plan to steal the marionette's gold coins. After Pinocchio leaves the theater Mirzilla the fox informs him that Geppetto is in the forest gathering firewood and needs help. As he is searching for his father, the fox and cat disguise themselves as bandits to harm him to get his gold coins. As they are chasing him, Pinocchio finds a windmill-like house and bangs on the door for pleading help, But the Euphoria the fairy who lives in the house said that she cannot let him in because he misbehaved and sold his schoolbook. So then Pinocchio was caught again by the robbers, and was hanged upside down from a nearby tree, but then the fairy with her poodle helped Pinocchio to scare away the robbers and was invited inside. after getting settled, Geppetto came to the house of the fairy and he was so glad to see Pinocchio safe at last.

Meanwhile, in the middle of the night while sleeping, Pinocchio meets the fox and the cat outside the window and the fox tells a tall tale about their friend Baron von Duron (which the character she'd described is a reference to the compulsive liar Baron munchausen) who planted his money in the field of miracles, which causes a money tree to sprout gold. Pinocchio believes their lies and goes to plant his gold only for the fox to steal it. While Pinocchio was waiting for his tree to grow he is captured by their boss Stromboli and is put to work for him as punishment. But after breaking the gears of a street organ by accident a distraction was made which causes Pinocchio to make his escape. Meanwhile his father Gepetto goes out to search for Pinocchio in the ocean but then is swallowed by The giant fish. But when Pinocchio finds out the fish swallowed him he decides to go to school to become a good boy, but when he does, he was made fun of by his classmates except for pippifax who is his closest friend. While Pinocchio is studying in class, a bunch of candies are thrown into the room by Euscbius the cat. The teacher Mr. Leher inspects it, finding a note inside saying: Attention Children! "Somewhere far away is a land where you can play all day long without a care. Where there is no school or work, all are welcome! bring your friends! come by late this afternoon in the crossing in the woods" Mr. Leher is concerned about this and informs the principal. But while he is out, the students climb out the window to playland. Pinocchio hesitates at first, but then decides to go.

Over in Playland, Pinocchio and his friends had so much fun that they play around all day long, only for them to be exhausted from playing. Then Stromboli, the fox and the cat decide to have Pinocchio be crowned as king and Pippifax as his Prime Minister only for them and the children to be transformed into donkeys and to be sold in the market. While Pinocchio and Pippifax were to be sold to the circus where they perform for audiences. after failing their performance and the ringmaster abusing them which causes audience to leave in disgust. Then the fairy showed up and transformed Pinocchio back into a puppet and he decides to make things right by rescuing his father from the belly of a terrible big fish by attaching balloons to the ends of the boat and floating up to the surface to shore. Then Pinocchio returns with his father to the circus where he finds Pippifax exhausted. After that, Pinocchio, Gepetto and the donkey Pippifax return to Playland were they rebelled against Stromboli and where the boys and girls see his true self because he attacked Pinocchio and his father with a knife. The children seize this and begin to chase Stromboli, the fox and the cat and run them off a cliff into the sea, where they are swallowed by the same giant fish that swallowed Pinocchio's father. In the end, the spell is broken in Playland and all of the donkeys are turned back into children and Pinocchio gets his wish and turns into a real boy.

== Cast ==
- Gina Prescott: Pinocchio as a puppet (voice)
- Uwe Thielisch: Pinocchio as a boy Ellen Prince provided the voice for the English dub.
- Martin Flörchinger: Papa Gepetto
- Alfred Müller: Stromboli
- Martin Hellberg: Arturo and in the English dubbed was voiced by Paul Frees
- Vera Oelschlegel: Mirzilla the Fox
- Peter Pollatschek: Eusebius the Cat
- Marianne Wünscher: Euphrosina the Good Fairy
- Detlev Wolf: Pippifax (lampwick)
- Herwart Grosse: Mr. Lehrer, Schoolmaster
- Helmut Schreiber: Ringmaster
- Carola Zschockelt: Pudel
- Harald Popig: Malte
- Hans Hardt-Hardtloff: Karsten
- Jürgen Marten: A Father
- Detlef Salzseider: Thomas
- Andreas Nehring: Alfons
- Lutz Kruger: Eduard
- Heinz Müller: Konrad
- Manfred Krug: Kaspar (voice)
- Roswitha Trexler: Prinzessin (voice)
