= Antonio Negri (poet) =

Italian poet (1881–1966)

Antonio Negri (1881–1966) was an Italian poet, best known for his works in Milanese language. He began writing in 1931, after retiring from work and relocating to Montevecchia, in Brianza, and was later a prolific author. One of his prominent works is On soldaa papà ("A soldier father", 1936), inspired by On papà soldaa ("A father soldier", 1935) by Giannino Sessa. While both works are based on the theme of a girl whose father dies in World War I, Negri's version is crudely anti-rhetoric (the orphan girl prostitutes herself to make a living) and conveys pacifist values that openly contrasted those promoted in Italy by the Fascist regime of the time.

Another prominent work by Negri was an adaptation of Carlo Collodi's Adventures of Pinocchio in verses, based on the poet's vision of Pinocchio as an "odysseic" and highly symbolical novel. In 1955, Negri also contributed to the realization of the Fontana a Pinocchio, a statuary fountain in Milan dedicated to Collodi's character, writing a line to be inscribed on the pedestal of Pinocchio's statue, namely: "E tu che mi guardi sei ben sicuro d'aver domato il burattino che vive in te?"

== Partial list of works ==
- Il sogno di Atimada (1931)
- Arte e poesia (1936)
- On soldaa papà (1936)
- El mond per aria (1945)
- Sogn d'ona nott d'inverno (1945)
- On'alba a Sirmion (1945)
- Rimaroeu, versiroeu...
- I legrii del Sur Togn
- Pover in spirit
- Le avventure di Pinocchio del Collodi: Originale interpretazione di Antonio Negri
