= Carlo Chiostri =

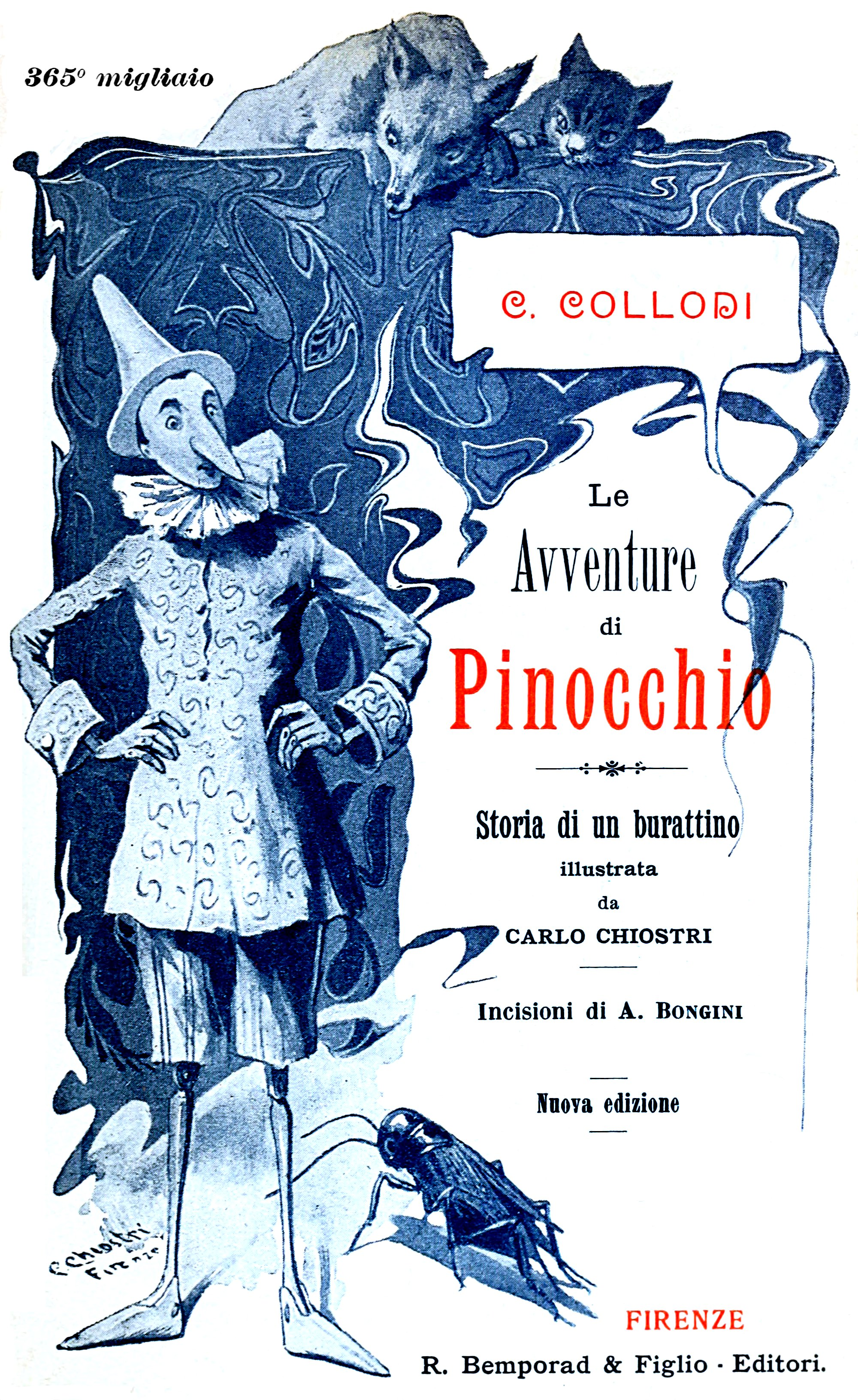
Title page from the 1902 edition

Carlo Chiostri (5 May 1863, in Florence – 9 July 1939, in Florence) was a self-taught Italian painter and graphic artist, best known for being one of the earliest illustrators for the book version of The Adventures of Pinocchio.

== Biography ==
He began working as an illustrator in the 1890s, primarily for the publishing houses of Adriano Salani Editore, R. Bemporad & figlio and Casa Editrice Nerbini. His drawings for Pinocchio were done in pen and watercolor, then engraved on wood. His designs for Ciondolino (1896) by Vamba, were made into etchings which were then "restituiti all'eleganza e alla grazia dell'originale" (returned to the elegance and grace of the original).

He illustrated the works of many other well-known authors, including Luigi Capuana, Emma Perodi, Emilio Salgari and Alberto Cioci (1867–1925), who wrote a sequel to Pinocchio called Lucignolo, l'amico di Pinocchio (Candlewick, Pinocchio's Friend). He also created drawings for Les Misérables by Victor Hugo, and the complete works of Tommaso Catani, a priest and friend of Carlo Collodi, who wrote children's books and elementary school readers. For many years, he was a contributor to Il giornalino della Domenica. The Journey of a Lead Soldier, written by Anna Franchi and published by Salani in 1901, met with considerable success. In 1910, he wrote Il falco e la colomba: melanconie d'un Gatto bigio (The Falcon and the Dove: Melancholy of a Gray Cat). Later, he designed postcards.

Federico Fellini had this to say about Pinocchio and Chiostri:

"I loved this story as a child, of course, very much, but I like it even today. I sat quite sunk dreaming about it, staring at the melancholy, ghostly shapes of Carlo Chiostri. They underlined also the sad side of this book, its taste of the bad dream, that fever sick trembling."
