= Tommaso Catani =

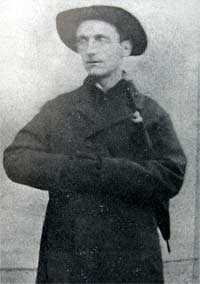
Tommaso Catani

Tommaso Catani (7 December 1858, Florence – 1 June 1925, Florence) was an Italian writer and presbyter.

== Biography ==
He graduated from La Grande Magnolia; a Piarist school, and, at the age of seventeen, became a Novice in the order. He then enrolled in the Faculty of Natural Sciences at the University of Florence, graduating in 1880 and being ordained as a priest the same year. After that, he taught in the public schools, but would spend most of his career at the Piarist College of Le Acacie. In 1904, he became Rector of the Colegio Il Canneto.

He had written two novels as an adolescent. When he met and befriended Carlo Collodi; author of The Adventures of Pinocchio, he was inspired to write his own sequel, Pinocchio in the Moon.

Although he is primarily remembered as an author of children's books and elementary school reading texts, he also wrote books on zoology, botany and religious subjects; notably a biography and appreciation of Saint John of the Cross. Many of his books' covers were designed by Carlo Chiostri, who had created illustrations for the original Pinocchio. Later, he founded the semi-monthly journal Il granello di pepe (The Peppercorn), in which he serialized several of his novels.

From 1914 to 1924, he concentrated on books about animals. Natalia Ginzburg has praised his imagination and noted that the bad fates met by some of the animals paralleled human misfortunes. In a series of books with a character named "Ugo", he introduced scientific concepts for the elementary school level.

== Sources ==
- Natalia Ginzburg, "La congiura delle galline", in Mai devi domandarmi, Milano, Garzanti, 1970, pp. 109-114.
- Antonio Faeti,Guardare le figure, Torino, Einaudi, 1972, pp. 72-83.
- Pino Boero, Carmine De Luca, La letteratura per l'infanzia, Roma-Bari, Laterza, 2009, pp. 128-130.
