= Pinocchio (play) =

Play by Dennis Kelly

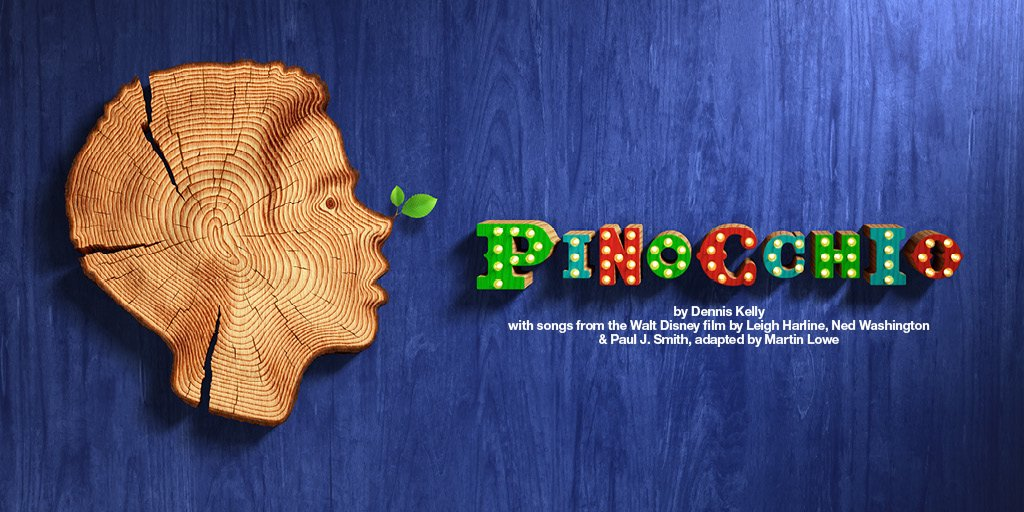
- Original National Theatre production poster
- Original language: English
- Written by: Dennis Kelly
- Based on: Pinocchio by Carlo Collodi and the 1940 film by Walt Disney
- Music by: Leigh Harline; Ned Washington; Paul J Smith; Martin Lowe

Premiere
- Date: 1 December 2017
- Place: Royal National Theatre, London
- Directed by: John Tiffany

Pinocchio is a play by Dennis Kelly, based on the classic children's story by Carlo Collodi and the 1940 Walt Disney film with the original songs and score by Leigh Harline, Ned Washington and Paul J. Smith, adapted by Martin Lowe. The play was presented by the Royal National Theatre, London in December 2017, by special arrangement with Disney Theatrical Productions.

== Synopsis ==
=== Act One ===
In the forest of Italy, the Fox attempts to chop down a magical tree, however he is stopped by the Blue Fairy, disguised as a blue star, who makes the tree glow blue. She takes the tree stump.

Meanwhile, in Geppetto's workshop, he is working on making a little boy puppet. He is interrupted by the Blue Fairy, disguised as a human, who requests him to make her a little boy puppet out of the tree stump she took earlier. Geppetto carves a little boy with minimal fuss ("Little Wooden Head"), but is shocked when the puppet comes to life and begins walking. Geppetto takes the puppet in as his son, and names him Pinocchio. Pinocchio eats all the food in the house, and quickly falls asleep.

The next morning, Pinocchio sees a group of school children playing and leaves Geppetto alone so he can go and play. Pinocchio takes his breakfast, an apple, with him. The school children think Pinocchio is weird and steal his apple, which mysteriously disappears. The Fox appears, holding the apple, and tells Pinocchio to use his knife to peel the apple, throwing the knife and stabbing Pinocchio in the chest. When the children leave, the Fox tells Pinocchio he is different because he is made of wood. Pinocchio has a nightmare of all the children calling him names ("Little Wooden Head (Reprise)").

Awake, Pinocchio, in an act to prove that he is made of wood, lights his finger on fire. He wishes that he was a real boy, and the Blue Fairy appears and tries to convince him that he should remain wooden. She restores his finger and tells Pinocchio that he must find the one thing that all humans share to become human. She tells Pinocchio that he'll need help on his journey, and introduces him to Jiminy Cricket, a hypochondriac cricket, who becomes Pinocchio's conscience. Pinocchio is rude to Jiminy and offends her.

The next day, on the way to school, Jiminy realises that Pinocchio has forgotten his coat, and she goes to fetch it from Geppetto's house. Pinocchio is approached by the Fox, who tells him that the one way to become a real boy is to become famous via the theatre. Pinocchio agrees to go with him to meet Stromboli, a famous travelling puppet theatre owner ("Hi Diddle-Dee-Dee").

Jiminy realises that Pinocchio is missing, and tells the Blue Fairy that she will go and find him. At Stromboli's theatre, Pinocchio is taught a song and dance routine that he performs with various marionettes and finds success ("I've Got No Strings"). Pinocchio has fun performing, but decides that an actor's life isn't for him. When he tries to leave, Stromboli locks him up in a bird cage and threatens to turn him into firewood. Meanwhile, Geppetto searches the streets for Pinocchio.

=== Act Two ===
Still locked up, Pinocchio is discovered by Jiminy, who tells him that she can unlock him, but she cannot. When Jiminy asks Pinocchio how he got into this situation, Pinocchio lies and his nose grows. The blue star appears and makes the padlock glow blue, and Jiminy is able to unlock it. They escape the theatre.

Geppetto is searching the streets for Pinocchio, when he is approached by the Blue Fairy. She tells him that she can erase his memories of Pinocchio, but he continues to search for him.

On the way back to the village, Jiminy tells Pinocchio that she is just a whistle away. Jiminy is attacked by the Fox, who tells Pinocchio that she ran on ahead. The Fox tells Pinocchio that the only way to become a real boy is through pleasure, and the best way to get pleasure is through a trip to Pleasure Island ("Hi-Diddle-Dee-Dee (Reprise)"). The Fox introduces Pinocchio to The Coachman, who is taking all the naughty children to Pleasure Island on his coach, where Pinocchio meets Lampy, a fiery Scottish girl, who makes friends with Pinocchio ("Fun and Fancy Free"). Meanwhile, Jiminy is still searching for Pinocchio.

At Pleasure Island, the Coachman introduces the children to cigarettes and alcohol, and lets them run with scissors. The children come across various warning signs, which the only educated child, Waxy, reads incorrectly. Later that night, Lampy and Pinocchio are smoking when Pinocchio decides he doesn't like Pleasure Island and wants to go home. The Coachman tells Pinocchio and Lampy that they will pay with their lives. Lampy begins turning into a donkey, growing hooves, ears, and a tail. Pinocchio grows a tail, but he whistles in time for Jiminy to arrive and help Pinocchio to escape Pleasure Island ("Give A Little Whistle").

Back at home, Pinocchio realises that Geppetto is nowhere to be seen in the village. The Blue Fairy appears and tells Pinocchio that Geppetto went out to the ocean to find Pinocchio and was swallowed whole by a whale known as Monstro. Pinocchio and Jiminy set off to the sea.

Once again, they are stopped by the Fox who tells Pinocchio why he wants to get rid of him. Pinocchio was carved out of a magical tree that the Fox was trying to destroy, and so he has sent Pinocchio to various dangerous situations. The Fox offers to pay Pinocchio for his head, but Jiminy Cricket jumps onto the Fox and Pinocchio cuts off the Fox's tail, the source of his power. Pinocchio and Jiminy jump into the sea.

Under the water, they find Monstro and are swallowed by him. Inside the whale's stomach, they find Geppetto and Pinocchio plans to tickle the back of Monstro's throat and get sneezed out. Jiminy and Geppetto ask Pinocchio various questions, to which he lies to make his nose grows. He reaches the back of his throat and Monstro sneezes, washing the trio out onto the beach.

Jiminy and Geppetto are fine, but Pinocchio appears to have died. At Geppetto's home, Pinocchio is awoken by the Blue Fairy who tells him that the one thing he needed to find was pain, and Pinocchio found that when he thought Geppetto had died, so Pinocchio has become human. Jiminy Cricket returns to her insect state, and Pinocchio and Geppetto embrace ("When You Wish Upon A Star").

== Productions ==
=== World premiere: London (2017-18) ===
The play had its world premiere at the Lyttleton Theatre at the Royal National Theatre, London running from 1 December 2017 to 10 April 2018. The production was directed by John Tiffany with design and puppet co-design by Bob Crowley, lighting design by Paule Constable, music supervision, orchestrations and additional music by Martin Lowe, movement direction by Steven Hoggett, puppet co-design and puppetry direction by Toby Olié, sound design by Simon Baker and illusions by Jamie Harrison. The production was presented by special arrangement with Disney Theatrical Productions.

== Cast ==
Character	London
Character	2017
Pinocchio	Joe Idris-Roberts
Jiminy Cricket	Audrey Brisson
Geppetto	Mark Hadfield
Blue Fairy	Annette McLaughlin
Fox	David Langham
Coachman	David Kirkbride
Lampy	Dawn Sievewright
Waxy	Jack North
Stromboli	Gershwyn Eustache Jnr

== Critical reception ==
The National Theatre production received mixed reviews from critics earning four and three star reviews.
