= The Case of Prosecutor M =

1928 German film

- Directed by: Rudolf Meinert; Giulio Antamoro
- Written by: Mikhail Petrovich Artzybashev (play); Norbert Falk
- Starring: Maria Jacobini; Jean Angelo; Gregori Chmara
- Cinematography: Nicolas Farkas; Eduard von Borsody
- Production company: Phönix-Film
- Distributed by: Deutsch-Russische Film-Allianz
- Release date: 4 October 1928
- Running time: 127 minutes
- Country: Germany
- Languages: Silent; German intertitles

The Case of Prosecutor M (German: Der Fall des Staatsanwalts M...) is a 1928 German silent mystery film directed by Rudolf Meinert and Giulio Antamoro and starring Maria Jacobini, Jean Angelo and Gregori Chmara. It was shot at the Staaken Studios in Berlin. The film's sets were designed by the art director Robert A. Dietrich. It was released in the United States in 1930 by Unusual Photoplays as The Strange Case of the District Attorney with English intertitles by Don Bartlett and an added sound effects track.

== Cast ==
- Maria Jacobini as Wera Mirzewa
- Jean Angelo as Mirzew, ihr Gatte
- Gregori Chmara as Poljarin
- Ida Wüst as Ivitzkaja
- Elza Temary as Sinaida Koljawa
- Natalya Rozenel as Julia
- Warwick Ward as Shegin
- Oreste Bilancia as Dr. Siegel
- Gyula Szőreghy as Starobelski
- Harry Frank as Plutanow
- Felicitas Holz

== Bibliography ==
- Alfred Krautz. International directory of cinematographers, set- and costume designers in film, Volume 4. Saur, 1984.
