= Giornale per i bambini =

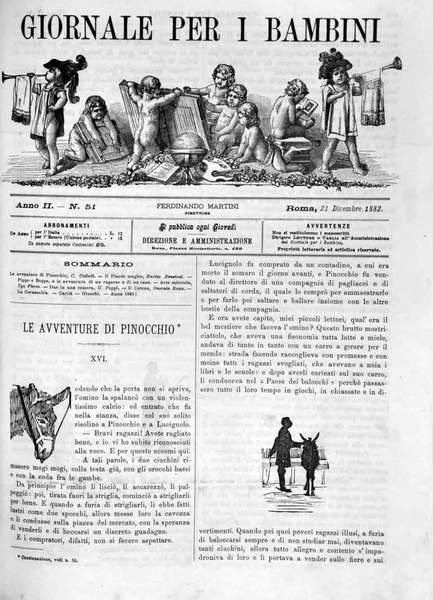
- The 21 December 1882 issue
- Frequency: Weekly
- Publisher: Tipografia dei Fratelli Bencini; Tipografia Bodoniana
- Founder: Ferdinando Martini
- First issue: 7 July 1881; 143 years ago
- Final issue: June 1889
- Country: Italy
- Language: Italian

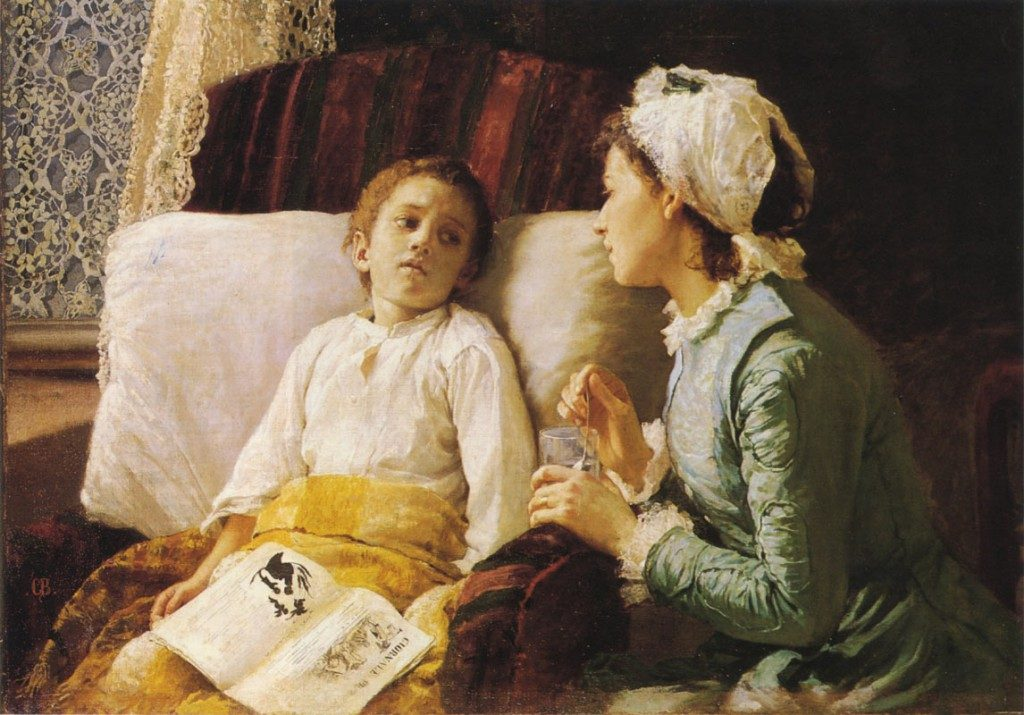
Il malatino (Italian for 'The sickly boy') by Cecrope Barilli, depicting a sick child with a copy of the Giornale per i bambini in his lap

Giornale per i bambini (Italian for 'Newspaper for children') was an Italian weekly periodical published in the 1880s by Tipografia dei Fratelli Bencini and later Tipografia Bodoniana. It first appeared as an insert in Fanfulla della domenica in 1881, and established as an independent publication later that year by Ferdinando Martini, who was also the periodical's first editor. The target audience was children between the ages of 6 and 12. The publication was owned by Ernesto Emanuele Oblieght, a Hungarian financier who also owned a number of other children's publications.

The first issue was published on 7 July 1881, in which appeared the first installment of the serial novel by Carlo Collodi with the title La storia di un burattino (Italian for 'The story of a puppet'). Over the next four months, eight more installments were published covering 15 chapters. This was followed by a hiatus of three months, after which the story resumed on 16 February 1882 as The Adventures of Pinocchio until its completion in January 1883.

Subscribers received a gift with the December 1883 issue, an Italian translation of the 1879 supplement to the George Weatherly book The "Little Folks" Painting Book.

Martini was officially succeeded as editor by Collodi, who held the position from 1883 to 1885. However, author and journalist Emma Perodi executed most of the editorial duties, but was not officially recognized in that role until 1887.

The last issue was published on 26 June 1889, after which the periodical and its staff was merged into Giornale dei fanciulli.
