= Fontana a Pinocchio =

Fountain in Milan, Italy

Coordinates: 45.46794°N 9.21366°E

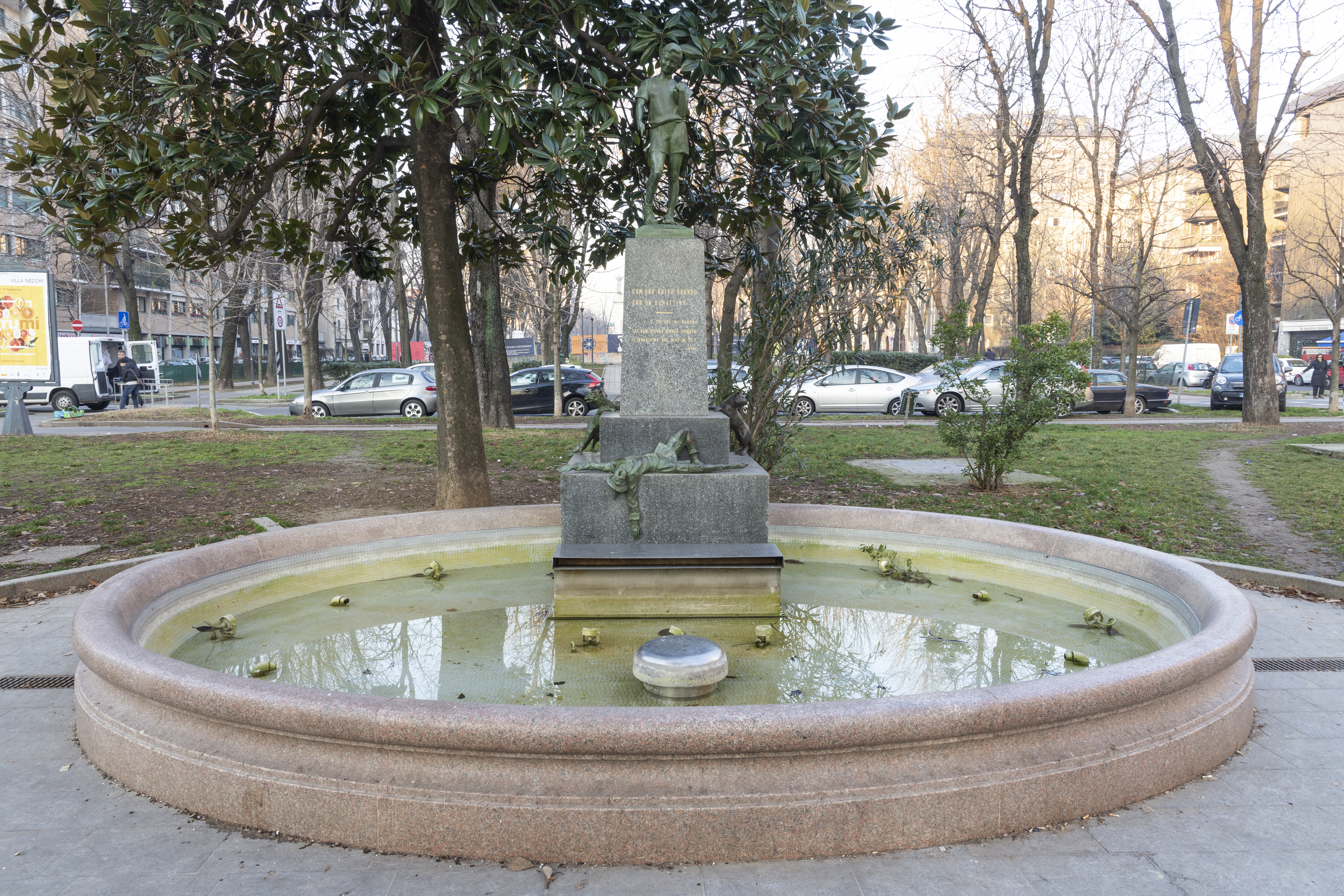
Fontana a Pinocchio

The Fontana a Pinocchio ("Fountain dedicated to Pinocchio") is a fountain and sculptural monument located in a traffic island in Corso Indipendenza, a central avenue of Milan, Italy. It is decorated with a complex of bronze statues based on Carlo Collodi's The Adventures of Pinocchio, designed by Italian sculptor Attilio Fagioli (1877–1966) and realized by the Fonderia Artistica Battaglia foundry.

The sculptures were completed by Fagioli in 1955 and the fountain was inaugurated on May 19, 1956.

The main statue portrays Pinocchio, after his transformation into a child, looking down at the inanimate body of the puppet he used to be. Smaller statues of the Cat and the Fox characters from Collodi's book were part of the complex, but have since been partially vandalized. The pedestal on which Pinocchio is standing bears an inscription by the Milanese poet Antonio Negri (1881–1966) and based on a line in Collodi's book, reading:

Com'ero buffo quand'ero un burattino! E tu che mi guardi, sei ben sicuro di aver domato il burattino che vive in te?

— Antonio Negri

In 1989, several prefabricated shopping stalls were placed in the traffic lane where the fountain is located, thus making it less visible than it used to be. Thereafter, the fountain has experienced a long period of decay, as the interior of the traffic lane has been used as a rubbish dump and repeated vandalisms have occurred; most notably, the statue of the Cat was stolen, and the nose of Pinocchio has been broken. In 2004, a parliamentary inquiry was directed to the Ministry of Culture complaining about the poor conditions of the fountain. A few months later, a local committee was formed to promote the restoration of the area. In 2010, the prefabricated stalls were removed by the city authorities and the traffic island was cleaned up. The fountain has been opened again to the public on December 18, 2013.
