= Candlewick (character) =

- Pinocchio character
- Lucignolo, as illustrated by Enrico Mazzanti
- First appearance: The Adventures of Pinocchio (1883)
- Created by: Carlo Collodi

In-universe information
- Species: Human (before), donkey (after)
- Gender: Male
- Nationality: Italian

Candlewick, real name Romeo, and also called Lampwick or Candleflame (Italian: Lucignolo [luˈtʃiɲɲolo]), is a fictional character who appears in Carlo Collodi's 1883 book The Adventures of Pinocchio (Le avventure di Pinocchio).

== Role ==
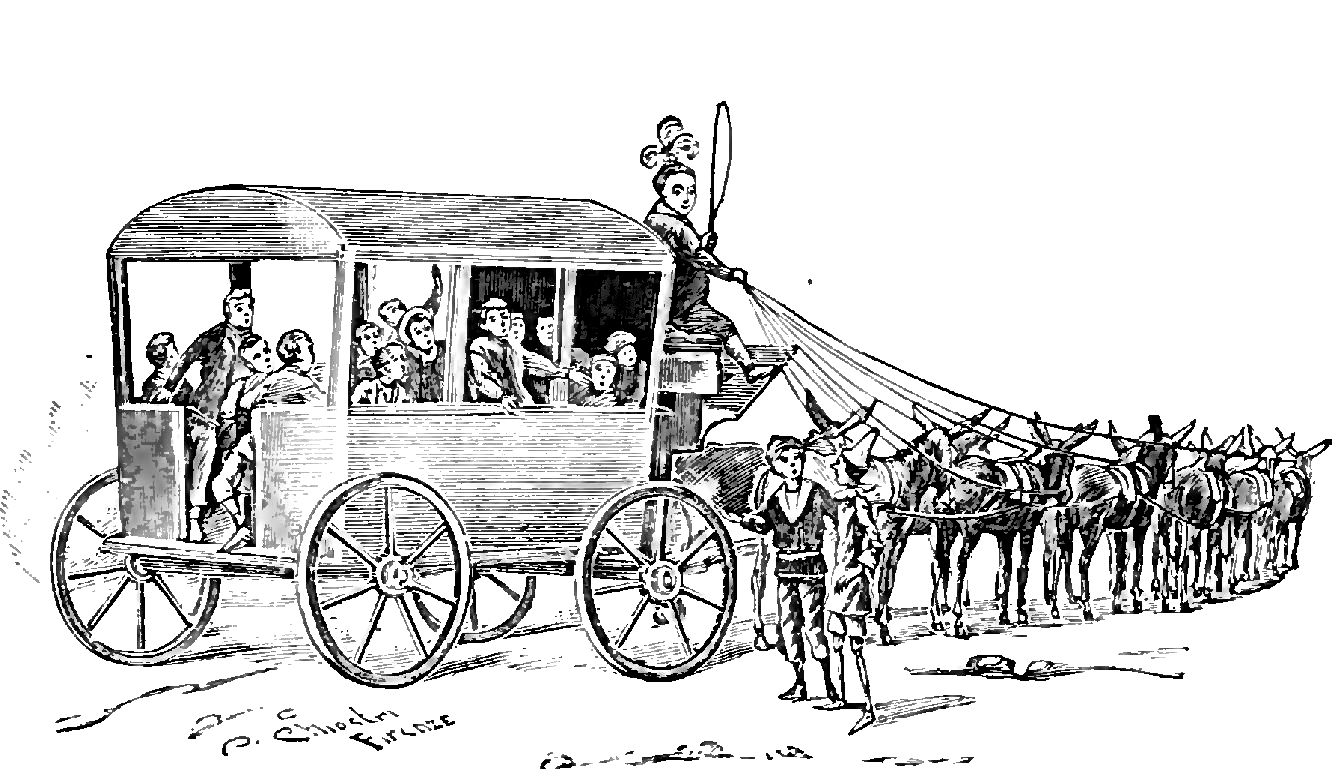
The wagon that leads the boys in the Land of Toys

Candlewick is introduced in chapter 30 of The Adventures of Pinocchio. His real name is Romeo, though he is given his nickname on account of his slender, polished build. He is described as the most unruly of Pinocchio's class, though he is the puppet’s best friend. He declines Pinocchio’s invitation to a party celebrating his upcoming transformation into a real boy, and persuades the puppet to instead come with him to the Land of Toys (Paese dei Balocchi).

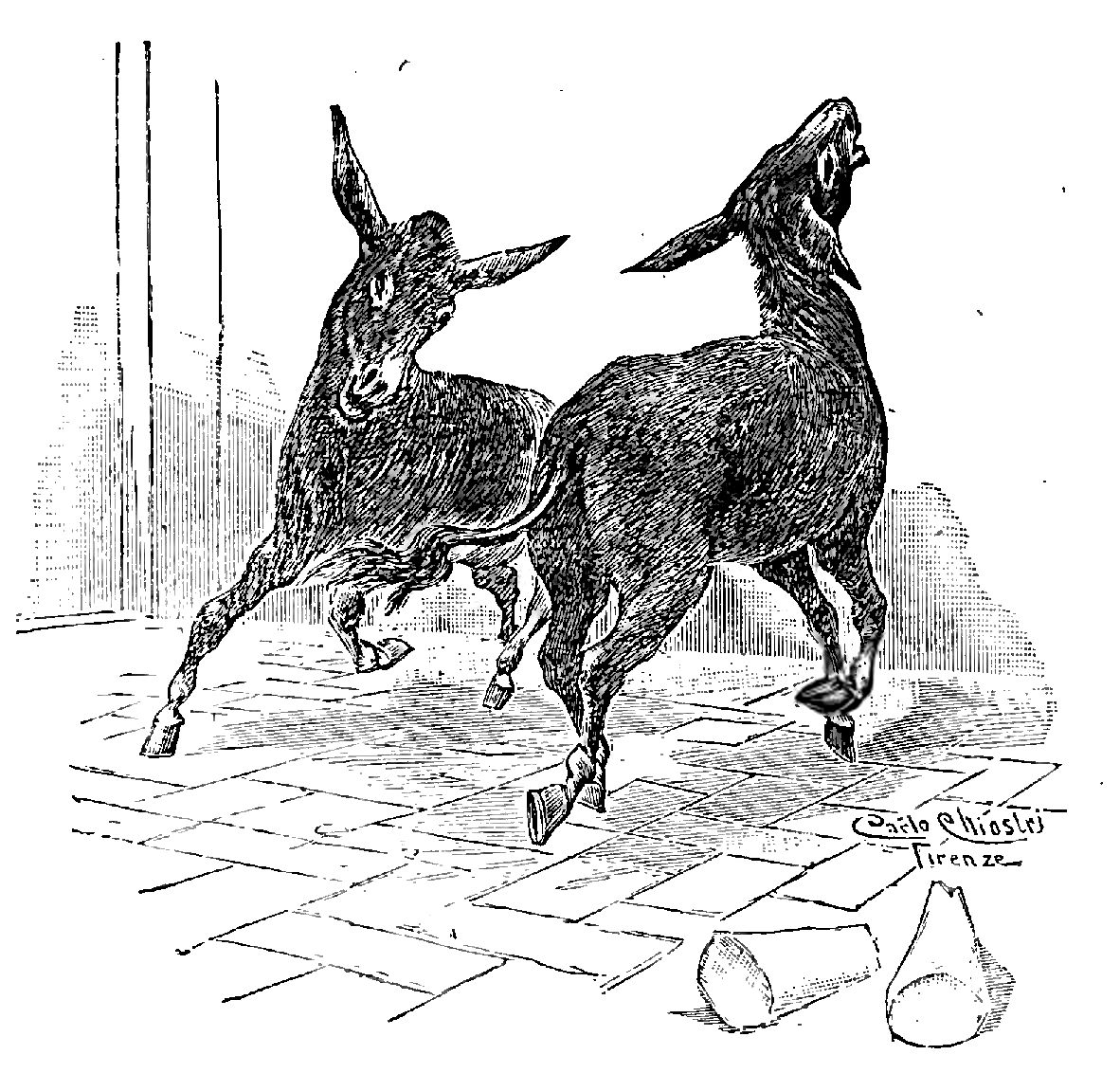
Their laughter soon turns to animal brayings and the two transform into a pair of donkeys.

The two are transported to the Land of Toys by the Coachman, and spend their days indulging in play and idleness. After five months, both of them awake with donkey ears, which they conceal with tall caps. The two are reluctant to admit their condition to each other, but after some coaxing, they simultaneously remove their caps and laugh at each other.

Their laughter fades into braying as the two of them transform into a pair of donkeys.

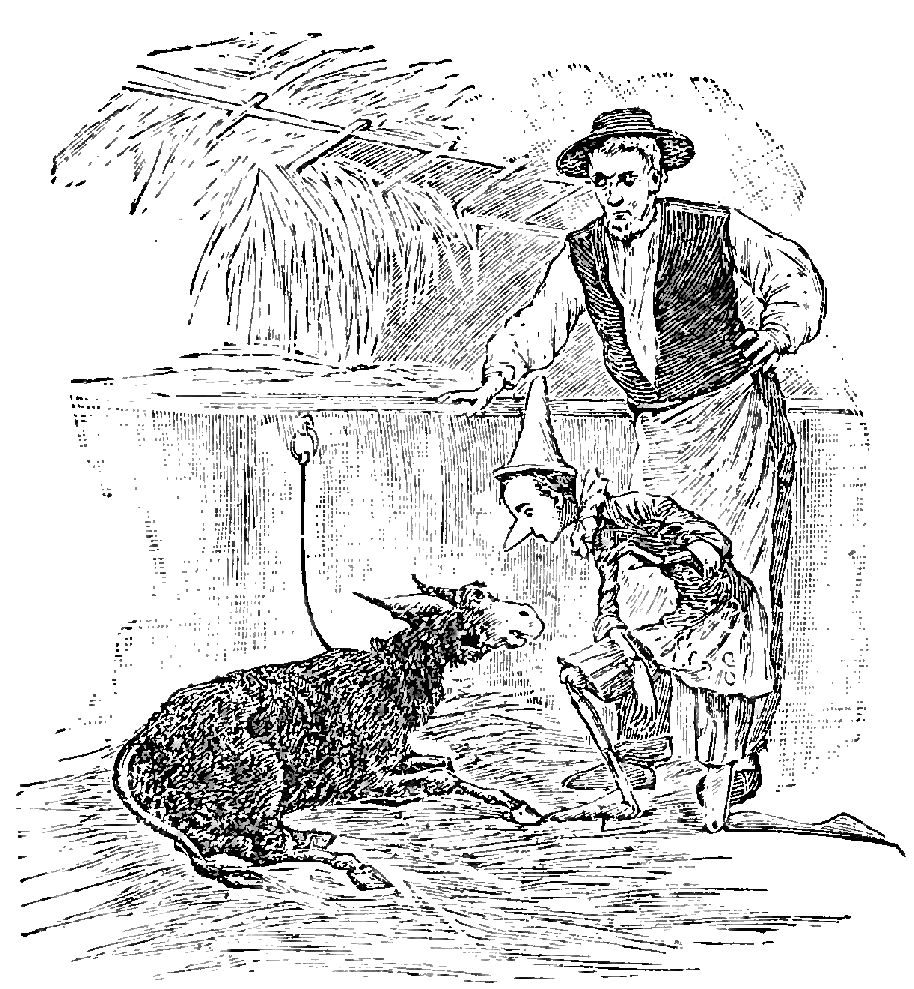
Pinocchio recognizes the farmer's donkey as his friend Candlewick.

While Pinocchio is sold to a circus ringleader, Candlewick is sold to a farmer who makes him work at a water mill after his previous donkey died.

Pinocchio and Candlewick meet again in the last chapter at Farmer George's farm where it is revealed that he is the farmer who bought Candlewick's donkey form and that he is dying from exhaustion. Now returned to normal, Pinocchio temporarily takes on Candlewick's job of doing farm work and is laughed at when he reveals to Candlewick's owner that he went to school with the animal where Candlewick even manages to regain some of his speech by struggling to say his name. Candlewick dies from exhaustion not long after.

== Adaptations ==
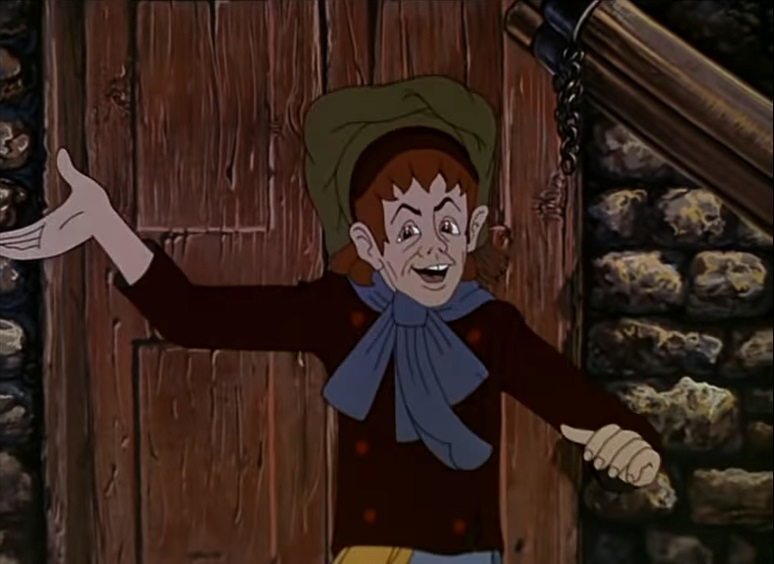
The Adventures of Pinocchio (1972).

The first Lucignolo (Candlewick) in cinema history was the French-Italian comedian Natalino Guillaume in The Adventures of Pinocchio (1911) directed by Giulio Antamoro, in a cast of adult actors, in which the character of Pinocchio was played by his brother Ferdinand Guillaume (Polidor).

The first child actor to play the role of Lampwick was Guglielmo Selvaggio in The Adventures of Pinocchio directed by Giannetto Guardone in 1947.

Lampwick appears in a 1972 Italian animated adaptation titled The Adventures of Pinocchio. Like the original story, he is a lazy boy who dislikes school and is Pinocchio's closest friend there. As in the novel, he convinces Pinocchio to come to Toyland with him, where they play many games, eat junk food, and go on amusement rides.

Eventually, he and Pinocchio transform into donkeys and are sold to a farmer and a circus, respectively. Near the end of the film after Pinocchio starts to work at the farm, he finds Lampwick heavily wounded and exhausted from overwork at the farm; the donkey then shortly dies. The character is voiced by Italian actress Flaminia Jandolo.

In the 1972 television miniseries The Adventures of Pinocchio, director Luigi Comencini entrusted the part to Domenico Santoro, a kid he had "discovered" while shooting a documentary on child labor in Naples (I bambini e noi, 1970).

In the 1976 made-for-TV musical Pinocchio starring Sandy Duncan in the title role and Danny Kaye as Geppetto, Candlewick is portrayed by Gary Morgan.

In the 1993 direct-to-video adaptation by GoodTimes Entertainment, Candlewick is voiced by Cam Clarke (who also voiced Flounder in "The Little Mermaid: Ariel's Beginning"). He is portrayed like his Disney counterpart Lampwick with red hair (though he does not have buckteeth) who tries to have fun in Dunceland with Pinocchio. Like his Disney counterpart, he is transformed into a donkey and his fate is unknown.

Lampwick appears in the 1996 film The Adventures of Pinocchio, portrayed by Corey Carrier as a boy whom Pinocchio meets at school and later convinces him to come with him to Terra Magica, where they are allowed to do whatever they please. Eventually, they and two other boys (one of which is Lampwick's best friend Saleo) ride a roller coaster. During the ride, they are splashed with enchanted water which turns them into animals based on their nature.

Lampwick, Saleo, and many of the other bad boys turn into donkeys, while Pinocchio only grows donkey ears. They are later corralled by Lorenzini, who fulfills the roles of both the Puppeteer and the Coachman. Pinocchio escapes and sets the other boys free.

During their escape, the donkey Lampwick kicks Lorenzini into the spring filled with the enchanted water which turns him into a whale. Close to the end of the movie, the donkey Lampwick is seen pulling Geppetto, Pinocchio, and Leona on a carriage alongside the donkey Saleo. Lampwick, along with Saleo and the other donkeys, eventually returns to human form by doing good deeds.

He can be seen playing with the human Pinocchio before the end credits. Unlike in the novel and the 1940 Disney version, Lampwick remains Pinocchio's best friend as a result of returning human and affectionately calls him "Woody" even after he himself becomes a real boy.

Lampwick appears in the 2002 feature film Pinocchio portrayed by Kim Rossi Stuart while his English dub voice was provided by Topher Grace. In the English version, he is named Leonardo. Leonardo first meets Pinocchio in Grabadimwit's prison after Pinocchio was cheated by the Fox and the Cat, teaching him what lollipop he licks, which is tangerine, and is then released from prison when his time there is up. Then they meet again after Pinocchio is kidnapped by a farmer to replace a dog that died. During that time, Leonardo attempts to steal chickens. Later, he entices Pinocchio to join him at The Land Of Toys. He turns into a donkey and is sold to a farmer. When Pinocchio and Geppetto escape from the Giant Shark and begin working for the same farmer, Pinocchio hears a weak bray and goes into the barn. There, he finds a sick donkey lying down and recognizes him as Leonardo, who weakly speaks Pinocchio's name. Although Pinocchio is happy to see Leonardo again, he is saddened by his condition. He then shares his tangerine lollipop with Leonardo, who licks it and says, "The flavor of paradise", before dying of exhaustion. Pinocchio mourns Leonardo's death and covers his body with a cloth.

Lampwick appears in the 2008 Pinocchio miniseries, played by Thomas Sangster. The miniseries is more faithful to the book; Lampwick has a much bigger role than in the Disney film, and he dies toward the end. This also develops him somewhat more, as it implies (though fans of the book or various film versions may have analyzed him this way anyway) that his lawlessness and cynicism comes from having a horrible father, as he tells Pinocchio before he dies that if he had had a father like Geppetto, he may have turned out more like Pinocchio, and his loyalty to Pinocchio is very apparent too, although most versions do imply their bond is quite strong.

Lampwick appears in the 2012 Italian animated film Pinocchio, voiced by Paolo Ruffini in the Italian and Noah Bernett in the English dub while also being renamed to Wickley. Like in the 1940 Disney version, his fate is left unknown after he is turned into a donkey.

In the 2013 American animated web series RWBY one of the villains, Roman Torchwick, alludes to Candlewick. The character's appearance is also based on the Disney version of the character, Lampwick, as they both have no respect for the law.

In the live-action Italian film Pinocchio (2019), co-written, directed and co-produced by Matteo Garrone, Lucignolo (who keeps his Italian name in the English version) is portrayed by Alessio Di Domenicantonio, while his English dub voice is provided by Vittorio Thermes. Like in the 1940 Disney version and the 2012 animated movie, his fate is left unknown after he is turned into a donkey.

In the stop-motion animated Netflix film Pinocchio, Candlewick is voiced by Finn Wolfhard. This version takes place in Fascist Italy. Candlewick is presented as the son of a village’s strict Podestà, who is the film's counterpart to The Coachman.

In this version, Candlewick is desperate to please his father by being the perfect Italian model soldier. He is afraid of disappointing his father, who perceives him as weak, giving him the cruel nickname "Candlewick" because he is small and scrawny. When Candlewick first meets Pinocchio, he bullies him while his father, who is initially skeptical of the puppet, quickly begins to view him as the perfect soldier upon the discovery that he cannot die.

Later, Candlewick is brought to a training camp, along with Pinocchio, by the Podestà, who runs the camp. Candlewick and Pinocchio strike up a friendship and share their feelings with each other. After a training game of capture the flag ends in a draw, the Podestà orders Candlewick to shoot Pinocchio dead to prove his worth as a soldier.

At that moment, the camp is bombed by Allied aircraft. Inspired by his friendship with Pinocchio, Candlewick finally stands up to his father, saying that he'll never be the son he wanted him to be. The Podestà is infuriated by Candlewick's insubordination, but becomes entangled in netting and is killed by a bomb.

After the camp is destroyed, Candlewick, who survives the attack, goes in search of Pinocchio. His ultimate fate is left unresolved at the end of the film.

In the sixteenth season of Dimension 20 (Neverafter), the Intrepid Heroes encounter a grown up Candlewick, still dressed in a too small boy's sailor outfit and gone mad.

=== Disney ===
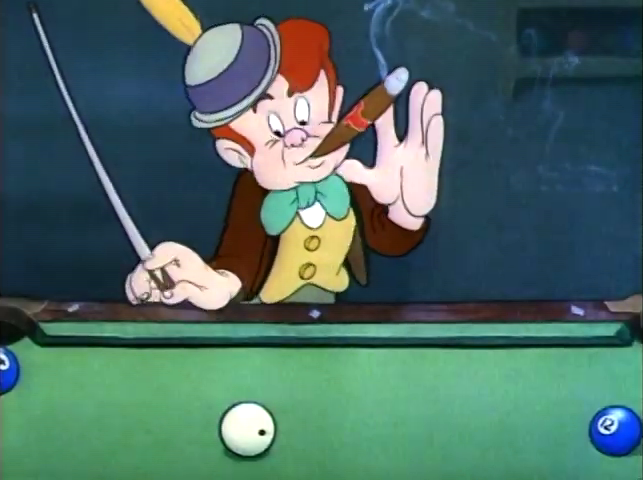
Lampwick, from the 1940 animated film.

Candlewick appears in Walt Disney's 1940 animated adaptation of Pinocchio. He is given the alternate translation of his name, Lampwick, and is voiced by Frankie Darro as a human and Clarence Nash in his donkey form. His likeness is modeled after Disney animator Fred Moore, and like his literary version, he is tall and slender and sports red hair and buck teeth. In the film, Lampwick befriends Pinocchio during the journey to Pleasure Island and leads Pinocchio astray by introducing him to such activities as fighting others, smoking and drinking. Jiminy Cricket finds Pinocchio playing pool with Lampwick who bullies Jiminy, calling him a "grasshopper" and "beetle", laughing at him after Jiminy threatens to fight him. After Jiminy storms off, Lampwick convinces Pinocchio not to go after him. Shortly after this altercation, Jiminy notices that the boys on Pleasure Island are literally turning into jackasses and being rounded up for slave labor. Lampwick's transformation is swift: within a minute, he loses all humanity (including his red hair and buckteeth) and is last seen wrecking the pool hall in panic as he realizes what has happened to him. Lampwick began transforming before and faster than Pinocchio because he was one of the worst-behaved boys on the island. It is unknown what happens to him afterwards, but it can be presumed that he was captured and sold into slave labor after he was left behind by Pinocchio and Jiminy.

Lampwick also makes a cameo in House of Mouse, as well as in Who Framed Roger Rabbit where he appears on a poster advertising for "exploding cigars" in Toontown, with his donkey ears from the original film. In live performance, Lampwick has often starred in Disneyland's Electrical Parade along with an unnamed boy from Pleasure Island, where Lampwick and the other boys have tails and donkey ears and wave to guests at Disneyland.

Jiminy finds Pinocchio with Lampwick, but before Jiminy can speak to Pinocchio, Lampwick knocks him down a gutter indirectly. Following later, like in the original film, Jiminy finds out that the children on Pleasure Island are transformed into donkeys to be sold to the salt mines. Like the original film, Lampwick turns into a donkey.

His panicked rampage was enough for Pinocchio and Jiminy Cricket to get away as he kicked a table into the direction of the Coachman and his Vapor Monster henchmen. Lampwick's fate is unknown after that, but like in the original film, he was most likely captured and sold into slave labor after Pinocchio and Jiminy left him behind.

== Bibliography ==
- Collodi, Le Avventure di Pinocchio 1883, Biblioteca Universale Rizzoli
