= Miss Dorothy =

1920 Italian silent film

- Directed by: Giulio Antamoro
- Starring: Carmen Boni
- Production company: Nova Film
- Distributed by: Nova Film
- Release date: June 1920
- Country: Italy
- Languages: Silent; Italian intertitles

Miss Dorothy is a 1920 Italian silent film directed by Giulio Antamoro and starring Carmen Boni.

== Cast ==
- Carmen Boni
- Romano Calò
- Lia Formia
- Diana Karenne

== Bibliography ==
- Stewart, John. Italian film: a who's who. McFarland, 1994.
