= The Adventures of Pinocchio =

1883 children's novel by Carlo Collodi

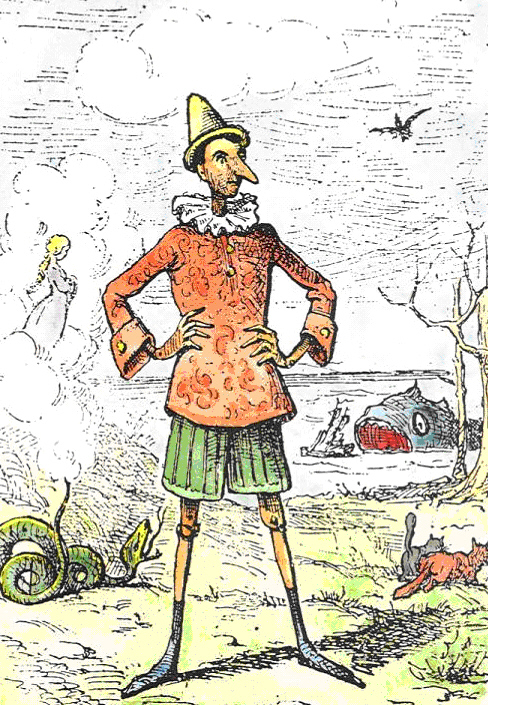
- Illustration from 1883 edition by Enrico Mazzanti
- Author: Carlo Collodi
- Original title: Le avventure di Pinocchio. Storia di un burattino
- Illustrator: Ugo Fleres (magazine); Enrico Mazzanti (novel)
- Language: Italian
- Genre: Fantasy, adventure, children's literature
- Publisher: Libreria Editrice Felice Paggi
- Publication date: 7 July 1881 – 25 January 1883 (magazine); February 1883 (novel)
- Publication place: Italy
- Pages: 228
- Text: The Adventures of Pinocchio at Wikisource

The Adventures of Pinocchio, (Note: /pɪˈnoʊkioʊ/ pin-OH-kee-oh; Italian: Le avventure di Pinocchio. Storia di un burattino [le avvenˈtuːre di piˈnɔkkjo ˈstɔːrja di um buratˈtiːno, - dj um -], i.e. "The Adventures of Pinocchio. Story of a Puppet") commonly shortened to Pinocchio, is an 1883 children's fantasy novel by Italian author Carlo Collodi. It is about the mischievous adventures of an animated marionette named Pinocchio. He faces many perils and temptations, meets characters who teach him about life, and learns goodness before he achieves his heart's desire to become a real boy.

The story was originally published in serial form as The Story of a Puppet (Italian: La storia di un burattino) in the Giornale per i bambini between 7 July 1881 and 25 January 1883, and was subsequently issued in book form in February 1883, with illustrations by Enrico Mazzanti. Since then, Pinocchio has been one of the most popular children's books and has been critically acclaimed.

An icon and a metaphor for the human condition, the book is considered a well-renowned piece of children's literature and has had a great impact on world culture. Philosopher Benedetto Croce considered it one of the greatest works of Italian literature. Since its first publication, it has inspired many works of fiction, such as Walt Disney's animated version, and commonplace ideas such as a liar's long nose.

The book has been translated into as many as 260 languages worldwide, making it one of the world's most translated books. While it is likely one of the best-selling books ever published, the actual total sales since its first publication are unknown due to the many reductions and different versions. According to Viero Peroncini, "some sources report 35 million [copies sold], others 80, but it is only a way, even a rather idle one, of quantifying an unquantifiable success." According to Francelia Butler, it also remains "the most translated Italian book and, after the Bible, the most widely read".

== Plot ==
In Tuscany, Italy, a carpenter named Master Antonio finds a log that he plans to carve into a table leg. However, after being frightened when the log cries out, he gives it to his neighbour Geppetto who wants to carve a puppet from it and make a living as a travelling puppeteer. He carves a boy and names him "Pinocchio". Once the puppet is finished and Geppetto teaches him to walk, Pinocchio runs out the door and into the town, where he is caught by a Carabiniere, who assumes Pinocchio has been mistreated and imprisons Geppetto.

Left alone, Pinocchio heads back to Geppetto's house where he meets a talking cricket, who warns him of the perils of disobedience and laziness. After being called a wooden head, in retaliation, Pinocchio throws a hammer at the cricket, accidentally killing it. Pinocchio gets hungry and tries to fry an egg, but a chick hatches from the egg and leaves to find food. He knocks on a neighbour's door, but they fear he is pulling a prank and dump water on him. Cold and wet, Pinocchio goes home and lies down on a stove, and upon waking he finds his feet have burned off. Luckily, Geppetto is released from prison, gives Pinocchio three pears to eat for breakfast, and makes him a new pair of feet. In gratitude, he promises to attend school and Geppetto makes him a suit of clothing consisting of a dress made of flowered paper, tree bark shoes, and a cap made of dough, and sells his only coat to buy him a spelling book.

On his way to school the next morning, Pinocchio encounters the Great Marionette Theatre and sells his school book to buy a ticket for the show. During the performance, the puppets Harlequin, Pulcinella and Signora Rosaura call out to Pinocchio. This disruption angers the puppet master Mangiafuoco, and he decides to use Pinocchio as firewood to cook his dinner. However, after Pinocchio pleads for his and Harlequin's salvation and he learns of Geppetto's poverty, Mangiafuoco releases him and gives him five gold pieces.

On his way home, Pinocchio meets a fox and a cat. The Cat pretends to be blind, and the Fox pretends to be lame; a white blackbird tries to warn Pinocchio of their lies, but the Cat eats it. The two convince Pinocchio that if he plants his coins in the Field of Miracles outside the city of Catchfools, they will grow into a tree with gold coins. They stop for dinner at the Red Lobster Inn where they trick Pinocchio into paying for their meals and flee after telling the innkeeper to tell Pinocchio they would meet him at the Field of Miracles in the morning.

As Pinocchio sets off for the city of Catchfools, the ghost of the Talking Cricket appears and tells him to go home and give the coins to his father. Pinocchio ignores his warnings again and as he passes through a forest, the Fox and Cat, disguised as bandits, ambush and attempt to rob him but fail. After biting off the Cat's paw, he escapes to a white house, where he is greeted by a young fairy with turquoise hair who says she is dead and waiting for a hearse. Unfortunately, the Fox and the Cat catch Pinocchio and hang him in a tree and leave after getting tired of waiting for him to suffocate, leaving Pinocchio to die alone and think about his misbehavior.

The Fairy has Pinocchio rescued and calls in three doctors to evaluate him: The Owl says he is alive, the Crow says he is dead, and the Ghost of the Talking Cricket says he is fine, but has been disobedient and hurt his father. The Fairy offers medicine to Pinocchio, which he takes when several Undertaker rabbits appear to collect his body. Now recovered, Pinocchio lies to the Fairy when she asks what happened to the gold coins, and his nose grows. The Fairy explains that Pinocchio's lies are causing his nose to grow and calls in a flock of woodpeckers to chisel it down to size. She then sends for Geppetto to come and live with them in the forest cottage.

As Pinocchio heads out to find Geppetto, he once again meets the Fox and the Cat, who remind him of the Field of Miracles, and he agrees to go with them and plant his gold. Once there, Pinocchio buries his coins and leaves to wait twenty minutes for it to grow, only for the Fox and the Cat to dig up the coins and run away.

Once Pinocchio returns, a parrot mocks him for falling for the Fox and Cat's tricks. Pinocchio rushes to the Catchfools courthouse, where he reports the theft of the coins to a gorilla judge. Although he is moved by Pinocchio's plea, the gorilla judge sentences him to four months in prison for the crime of foolishness. Fortunately, all criminals are released early when the Emperor of Catchfools declares a celebration following his army's victory over the town's enemies.

As Pinocchio heads back to the forest, he finds an enormous snake with a smoking tail blocking the way. He asks the serpent to move, but it remains completely still, and he assumes it is dead. He begins to step over it, but it suddenly rises up and hisses at him, toppling him over onto his head. Struck by Pinocchio's fright and comical position, the snake laughs so hard he bursts an artery and dies.

Pinocchio then heads back to the Fairy's house in the forest, where he sneaks into a farmer's yard to steal some grapes. He is caught in a weasel trap and encounters a glowworm. The farmer finds him and ties him up in his doghouse. When Pinocchio foils the chicken-stealing weasels, the farmer frees him as a reward. Pinocchio finally returns to the cottage, but there he finds nothing but a gravestone, and believes the Fairy has died.

A friendly pigeon sees Pinocchio mourning the Fairy's death and offers to give him a ride to the seashore, where Geppetto is building a boat to search for Pinocchio. Pinocchio is washed ashore when he tries to swim to his father, who is swallowed by The Terrible Dogfish. Pinocchio accepts a ride from a dolphin to the Island of Busy Bees where everyone works every day. Upon arriving there, Pinocchio offers to carry a lady's jug home in return for food and water, and upon arriving at her house, he recognizes the lady as the Fairy, now old enough to be his mother. She says she will act as his mother, and he will begin going to school. She hints that if he does well in school and is good for one year, then he will become a real boy.

Pinocchio studies hard and rises to the top of his class, making the other boys jealous. They trick Pinocchio into playing hooky by saying they saw a large sea monster at the beach, the same one that swallowed Geppetto. However, they were lying, and a fight breaks out, during which Pinocchio is accused of injuring another boy. He escapes, and along the way saves a drowning Mastiff named Alidoro. In exchange, Alidoro later saves Pinocchio from The Green Fisherman, who was going to eat him. After he meets the Snail who works for the Fairy, she gives him another chance.

Pinocchio does excellently in school, and the Fairy promises that he will be a real boy the next day, saying he should invite all his friends to a party. He goes to invite everyone, but he is sidetracked after meeting Candlewick, one of his closest friends, who tells him he is heading to a place called Toyland, where children play all day and never work or study. Pinocchio goes along with him, and they have a wonderful time for the next five months.

One morning, Pinocchio and Candlewick awake with donkeys' ears. A marmot tells Pinocchio that he has gotten donkey fever, as boys who play and never study or work turn into donkeys. Soon, both Pinocchio and Candlewick are fully transformed, and Pinocchio is sold to a circus where he is trained to do tricks. He falls and sprains his leg after seeing the Fairy in one of the box seats. The ringmaster then sells Pinocchio to a man who wants to skin him and use his hide to make a drum, and throws him into the sea to drown him. But when he goes to retrieve the corpse, he finds Pinocchio, who explains that the fish ate all the donkey skin off him and he is now a puppet again. Pinocchio dives back into the water and swims out to sea, where the Terrible Dogfish appears and swallows him. Inside the Dogfish, Pinocchio unexpectedly finds Geppetto, and they escape with help from a large tuna and look for a new place to live.

Pinocchio and Geppetto encounter the Fox and the Cat, who are now impoverished. The Fox has become lame and the Cat has gone blind, respectively. They plead for food and money, but Pinocchio rebuffs them and tells them that they have earned their misfortune. Geppetto and Pinocchio then arrive at a small house, which is home to the Talking Cricket. The cricket says they can stay and reveals that he got his house from a little goat with turquoise hair. Pinocchio gets a job doing work for a farmer, and recognizes his dying donkey as his friend Candlewick.

After long months of working for the farmer and supporting the ailing Geppetto, Pinocchio goes to town with the forty pennies he has saved to buy himself a new suit. He discovers that the Fairy is ill and needs money, and gives the Snail he met back on the Island of Busy Bees all of his money. That night, he dreams that he is visited by the Fairy, who kisses him. When he wakes up, he is a real boy, with his puppet body lying lifeless on a chair. The Fairy has also left him a new suit, boots, and a bag which contains 40 gold coins. Geppetto also returns to health.

== Characters ==
- Pinocchio – A marionette who gains wisdom through a series of misadventures that lead him to becoming a real human as reward for his good deeds.
- Geppetto – An elderly, impoverished woodcarver and the creator and father figure of Pinocchio. He wears a yellow wig that resembles cornmeal mush (or polendina), and because of this the children of the neighborhood and some adults call him "Polendina", which greatly annoys him. "Geppetto" is a syncopated form of Giuseppetto, which in turn is a diminutive of the name Giuseppe (Italian for Joseph).
- The Talking Cricket (il Grillo Parlante) – A cricket whom Pinocchio kills after it tries to give him some advice, and later returns as a ghost to continue advising him.
- The Fairy with Turquoise Hair (la Fata dai capelli turchini) – The spirit of the forest, who rescues Pinocchio and adopts him first as her brother, then as her son.
- The Snail (la Lumaca) – A snail who works for the Fairy with Turquoise Hair. Pinocchio later gives all his money to the Snail by their next encounter.
- Candlewick aka "Lucignolo" – A juvenile delinquent who is as tall and thin as a wick. He is Pinocchio's best friend, but also serves as a bad influence for him. His nickname translates to either "Lampwick" or "Candlewick" because of his lanky physique.
- The Coachman (l'Omino) – The owner of the Land of Toys, who takes naughty, disobedient, and lazy children there on his stagecoach, which is pulled by twenty-four donkeys with white shoes on their hooves. Once the children who visit turn into donkeys, he sells them for labor.
- The Terrible Dogfish (Il terribile Pesce-cane) – A mile-long, five-story-high fish. Pescecane, while literally meaning "dog fish", generally means "shark" in Italian.
- Mangiafuoco ("Fire-Eater" in English) – The wealthy director of the Great Marionette Theater, who has red eyes and a black beard that reaches to the floor, with his mouth being "as wide as an oven [with] teeth like yellow fangs". Despite his appearance, Mangiafuoco is not evil.
- The Green Fisherman (il Pescatore verde) – A green-skinned ogre on the Island of Busy Bees who catches Pinocchio in his fishing net and attempts to eat him while thinking that he is a "puppet fish". According to Giacomo Maria Prati, The Green Fisherman is one example of the story's parallels with classical mythology, stating that the Fisherman is evocative of the cyclops Polyphemus of Homer's Odyssey. He also writes that the Green Fisherman represents murder through ignorance, referring to the fact that he tries to eat Pinocchio, unaware he was not an edible fish.
- The Fox and the Cat (la Volpe e il Gatto) – Greedy anthropomorphic animals who pretend to be lame and blind respectively. Throughout the story, they lead Pinocchio astray, rob him, and eventually try to hang him.
- Mastro Antonio ([anˈtɔːnjo] in Italian, /ɑːnˈtoʊnjoʊ/ ahn-TOH-nyoh in English) – An elderly carpenter, who finds the log that eventually becomes Pinocchio, planning to make it into a table leg until it cries out "Please be careful!" The children call Antonio "Mastro Ciliegia (cherry)" because of his red nose.
- Arlecchino, Pulcinella, and Signora Rosaura – Marionettes at the theater who embrace Pinocchio as their brother.
- The Innkeeper (l'Oste) – An employer who is tricked by the Fox and the Cat and unknowingly leads Pinocchio into an ambush.
- The Falcon (il Falco) – A falcon who helps the Fairy with Turquoise Hair rescue Pinocchio from hanging.
- Medoro ([meˈdɔːro] in Italian) – A poodle who is the mice-pulled stagecoach driver for the Fairy with Turquoise Hair. He is described as being dressed in court livery. He wears a tricorn with gold lace over a wig of waist-length white curls, a chocolate-colored velvet coat with diamond buttons and two huge pockets filled with bones, crimson velvet breeches, silk stockings, and silver-buckled slippers.
- The Owl (la Civetta) and the Crow (il Corvo) – Two famous doctors who diagnose Pinocchio alongside the Talking Cricket.
- The Parrot (il Pappagallo) – A parrot who tells Pinocchio of the Fox and the Cat's trickery and mocks him for being tricked by them.
- The Judge (il Giudice) – An old gorilla who works as a judge of Catchfools. He wears glasses that is missing a lens.
- The Serpent (il Serpente) – A large serpent with bright green skin, burning fiery eyes, and a smoking pointed tail.
- The Farmer (il Contadino) – An unnamed farmer whose chickens are plagued by weasel attacks. He previously owned a watch dog named Melampo.
- The Glowworm (la Lucciola) – A glowworm that Pinocchio encounters in the farmer's grape field.
- The Pigeon (il Colombo) – A pigeon who gives Pinocchio a ride to the seashore.
- The Dolphin (il Delfino) – A dolphin who gives Pinocchio a ride to the Island of Busy Bees and informs him of the Terrible Dogfish.
- Alidoro ([aliˈdɔːro] in Italian, /ˌɑːliˈdɒroʊ/ AH-lee-DORR-oh in English, literally "Golden Wings"; il can Mastino) – The old mastiff of a carabineer on the Island of Busy Bees.
- The Marmot (la Marmotta) – A marmot who lives in the Land of Toys and informs Pinocchio of the donkey fever.
- The Ringmaster (il Direttore) – The unnamed ringmaster of a circus that buys Pinocchio from the Coachman.
- The Master (il Compratore) – A man who wants to make Pinocchio's hide into a drum after the Ringmaster sold an injured Pinocchio to him.
- The Tuna Fish (il Tonno) – A tuna fish as "large as a two-year-old horse" who has been swallowed by the Terrible Shark.
- Giangio ([ˈdʒandʒo] in Italian, /ˈdʒɑːndʒoʊ/ JAHN-joh in English) – The farmer who buys Candlewick as a donkey and who Pinocchio briefly works for. He is called Farmer John in some versions.

== History ==
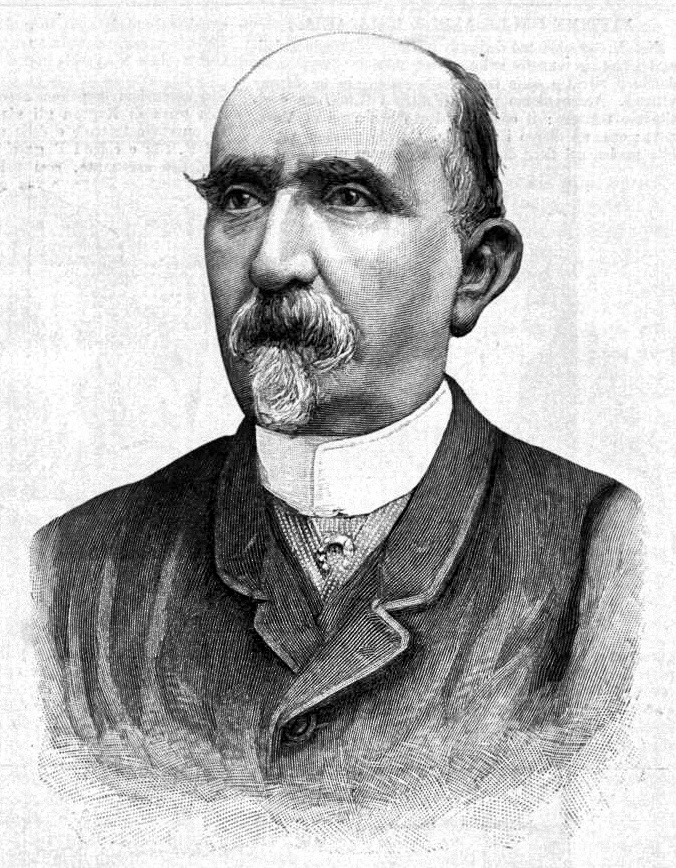
Carlo Collodi

The Adventures of Pinocchio incorporates elements similar to that of fairy tales, as it is a story about an animated puppet and boys who turn into donkeys. The story is set in the Tuscan area of Italy, and features Italian language peppered with Florentine dialect features, such as the protagonist's Florentine name.

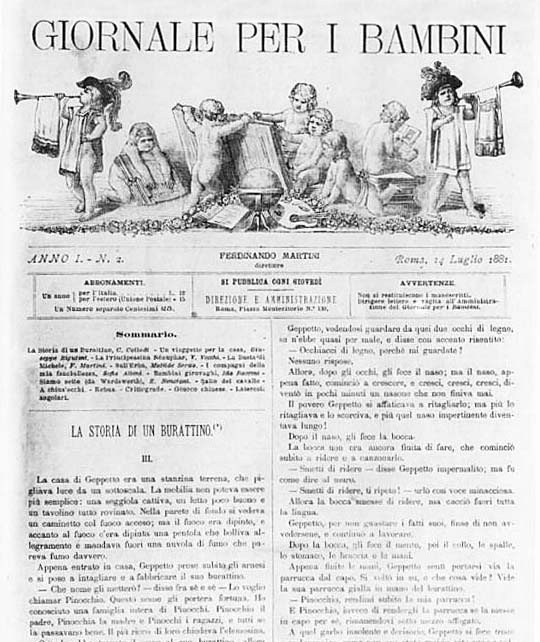
The third chapter of the story published on 14 July 1881, in the Giornale per i bambini

As a young man, Collodi joined the seminary. However, the cause of Italian unification (Risorgimento) usurped his calling, as he took to journalism as a means of supporting the Risorgimento in its struggle with the Austrian Empire. In the 1850s, Collodi began to have a variety of both fiction and non-fiction books published. Once, he translated some French fairy-tales so well that he was asked whether he would like to write some of his own. In 1848, Collodi started publishing Il Lampione, a newspaper of political satire. With the founding of the Kingdom of Italy in 1861, Collodi ceased his journalistic and militaristic activities and began writing children's books.

Collodi wrote a number of didactic children's stories for the recently unified Italy, including Viaggio per l'Italia di Giannettino ("Little Johnny's voyage through Italy"; 1876), a series about an unruly boy who undergoes humiliating experiences while traveling the country, and Minuzzolo (1878). In 1881, he sent a short episode in the life of a wooden puppet to a friend who edited a newspaper in Rome, wondering whether the editor would be interested in publishing this "bit of foolishness" in his children's section. The editor did, and the children loved it.

The Adventures of Pinocchio was originally published in serial form as La storia di un burattino in the Giornale per i bambini, one of the earliest Italian weekly magazines for children, beginning on 7 July 1881. The serialization initially ran for nearly four months and eight instalments, stopping at Chapter 15, in which Pinocchio dies a gruesome death: hanged for his innumerable faults. Following strong reader demand and at the request of the editor, Collodi resumed the narrative on 16 February 1882, with the title Le avventure di Pinocchio, adding Chapters 16–30, in which the Fairy with Turquoise Hair rescues Pinocchio and ultimately transforms him into a real boy once he acquires a deeper understanding of himself, thereby making the story more suitable for a child audience. In this second half of the work, the maternal figure of the Blue-haired Fairy becomes dominant, in contrast to the paternal figure of Geppetto, who prevails in the first part. The complete story concluded on 25 January 1883 after a total of 30 chapters published across 26 issues, all illustrated by Ugo Fleres. In February 1883, the tale was published with great success in a single-volume book edition, divided into 36 chapters, issued in Florence by Felice Paggi and illustrated by Enrico Mazzanti.

Children's literature was a new idea in Collodi's time, an innovation in the 19th century. Thus in content and style it was new and modern, opening the way to many writers of the following century.

== International popularity ==
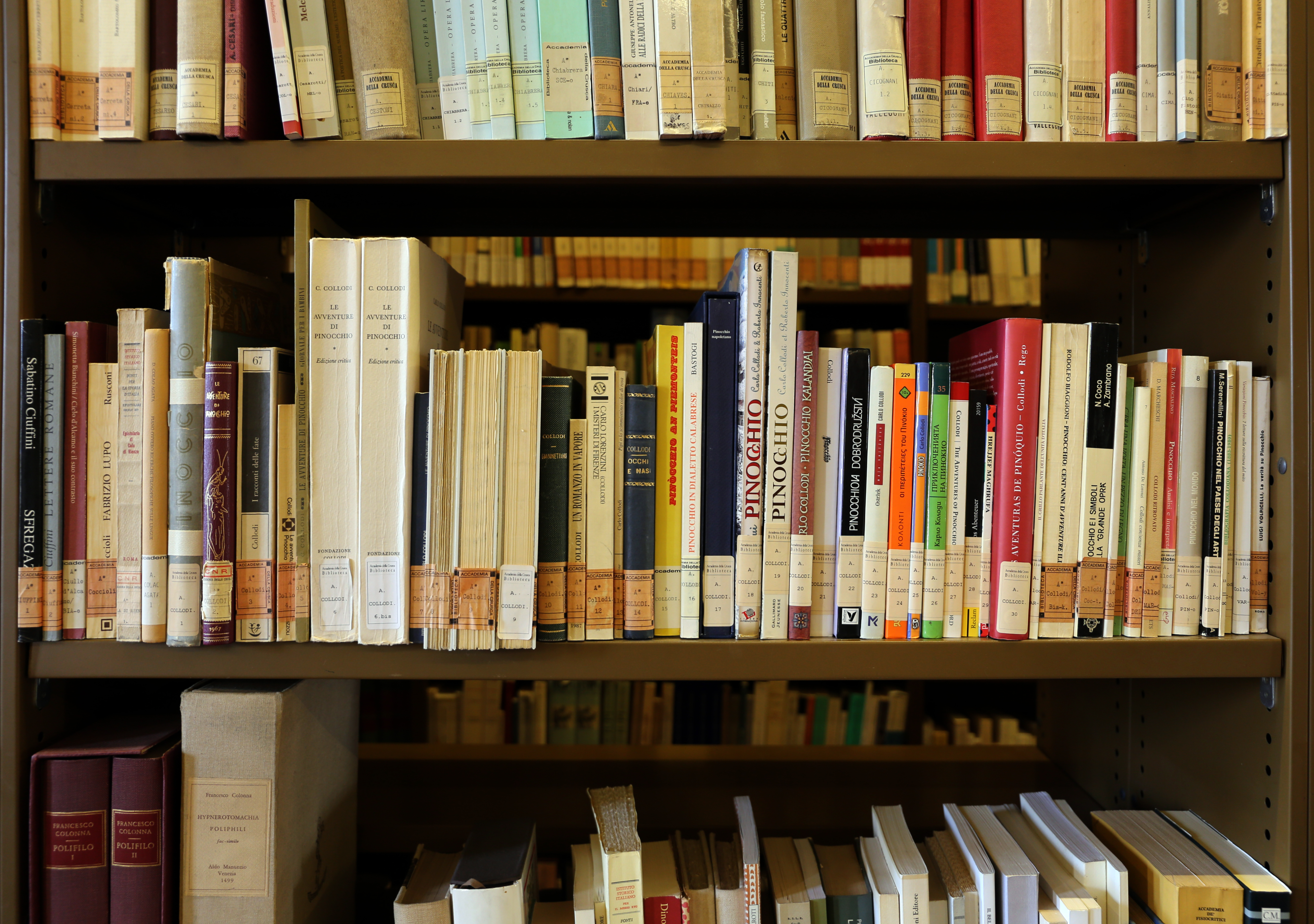
Some of the more than 260 translations of the book displayed at the Accademia della Crusca library, Florence

The Adventures of Pinocchio is the world's third most translated book (240–260 languages), and was the first work of Italian children's literature to achieve international fame. The book has had great impact on world culture, and it was met with enthusiastic reviews worldwide. The title character is a cultural icon and one of the most reimagined characters in children's literature. The popularity of the story was bolstered by the powerful philosopher-critic Benedetto Croce, who greatly admired the tale and reputed it as one of the greatest works of Italian literature.

Carlo Collodi, who died in 1890, was respected during his lifetime as a talented writer and social commentator. His fame continued to grow when Pinocchio was first translated into English by Mary Alice Murray in 1892 as The Story of a Puppet: or The Adventures of Pinocchio, published in London by T. Fisher Unwin with Mazzanti’s original illustrations; this translation was later included in the widely read Everyman’s Library in 1911. The first appearance of the book in the United States was in 1898, under the title Pinocchio’s Adventures in Wonderland. It was a pirated edition published in Boston by Jordan Marsh, using Murray’s English translation and Mazzanti’s illustrations, and also including four new colour plates by René Quentin. The first official US edition was published in 1904 in New York by Ginn and Co. as Pinocchio: The Adventures of a Marionette, translated and illustrated by Americans: Walter S. Cramp and Charles Copeland. From that time, the story was one of the most famous children's books in the United States and an important step for many illustrators. Other well regarded English translations include the 1926 translation by Carol Della Chiesa, and the 1986 bilingual edition by Nicolas J. Perella.

Together with those from the United Kingdom, the American editions contributed to the popularity of Pinocchio in countries more culturally distant from Italy, such as Iceland and Asian countries. In 1905, Otto Julius Bierbaum published a new version of the book in Germany, entitled Zapfelkerns Abenteuer (lit. The Adventures of Pine Nut), and the first French edition was published in 1902. Between 1911 and 1945, translations were made into all European languages and several languages of Asia, Africa and Oceania. In 1936, Soviet writer Aleksey Nikolayevich Tolstoy published a reworked version of Pinocchio titled The Golden Key, or the Adventures of Buratino (originally a character in the commedia dell'arte), which became one of the most popular characters of Russian children's literature.

The first stage adaptation was launched in 1899, written by Gattesco Gatteschi and Enrico Guidotti and directed by Luigi Rasi. Also, Pinocchio was adopted as a pioneer of cinema: in 1911, Giulio Antamoro featured him in a 45-minute hand-coloured silent film starring Polidor (an almost complete version of the film was restored in the 1990s). In 1932, Noburō Ōfuji directed a Japanese movie with an experimental technique using animated puppets, while in the 1930s in Italy, there was an attempt to produce a full-length animated cartoon film of the same title. The 1940 Walt Disney version was a groundbreaking achievement in the area of effects animation, giving realistic movement to vehicles, machinery and natural elements such as rain, lightning, smoke, shadows and water.

== Literary analysis ==
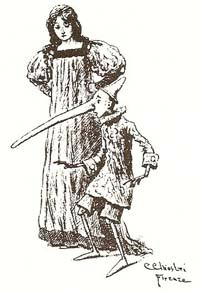
"As he lies, his nose grows", illustration by Carlo Chiostri

Before writing Pinocchio, Collodi wrote a number of didactic children's stories for the recently unified Italy, including a series about an unruly boy who undergoes humiliating experiences while traveling the country, titled Viaggio per l'Italia di Giannettino ("Little Johnny's voyage through Italy"). Throughout Pinocchio, Collodi chastises Pinocchio for his lack of moral fiber and his persistent rejection of responsibility and desire for fun.

The structure of the story of Pinocchio follows that of the folk-tales of peasants who venture out into the world but are naively unprepared for what they find, and get into ridiculous situations. At the time of the writing of the book, this was a serious problem, arising partly from the industrialization of Italy, which led to a growing need for reliable labour in the cities; the problem was exacerbated by similar, more or less simultaneous, demands for labour in the industrialization of other countries. One major effect was the emigration of much of the Italian peasantry to cities and to foreign countries, often as far away as the Americas.

Some literary analysts have described Pinocchio as an epic hero. According to Thomas J. Morrissey and Richard Wunderlich in Death and Rebirth in Pinocchio (1983) "such mythological events probably imitate the annual cycle of vegetative birth, death, and renascence, and they often serve as paradigms for the frequent symbolic deaths and rebirths encountered in literature. Two such symbolic renderings are most prominent: re-emergence from a journey to hell and rebirth through metamorphosis. A journey to the underworld—termed katabasis—is a common feature of Eurasian literary epics; Gilgamesh, Odysseus, Aeneas, and Dante all benefit from the knowledge and power they gain after such descents. Rebirth through metamorphosis, however, is a motif generally consigned to fantasy or speculative literature [...] These two figurative manifestations of the death-rebirth trope are rarely combined; however, Carlo Collodi's great fantasy-epic, The Adventures of Pinocchio, is a work in which a hero experiences symbolic death and rebirth through both infernal descent and metamorphosis. Pinocchio is truly a fantasy hero of epic proportions [...] Beneath the book's comic-fantasy texture—but not far beneath—lies a symbolic journey to the underworld, from which Pinocchio emerges whole."

The main imperatives demanded of Pinocchio are to work, be good, and study. And in the end Pinocchio's willingness to provide for his father and devote himself to these things transforms him into a real boy with modern comforts. "as a hero of what is, in the classic sense, a comedy, Pinocchio is protected from ultimate catastrophe, although he suffers quite a few moderate calamities. Collodi never lets the reader forget that disaster is always a possibility; in fact, that is just what Pinocchio's mentors —Geppetto, the Talking Cricket, and the Fairy— repeatedly tell him. Although they are part of a comedy, Pinocchio's adventures are not always funny. Indeed, they are sometimes sinister. The book's fictive world does not exclude injury, pain, or even death—they are stylized but not absent. [...] Accommodate them he does, by using the archetypal birth-death-rebirth motif as a means of structuring his hero's growth to responsible boyhood. Of course, the success of the puppet's growth is rendered in terms of his metamorphic rebirth as a flesh-and-blood human."

== Adaptations ==
The story has been adapted into many forms on stage and screen, some keeping close to the original Collodi narrative while others treat the story more freely. There are at least fourteen English-language films based on the story, Italian, French, Russian, German, Japanese and other versions for the big screen and for television, and several musical adaptations.

=== Films ===
==== Live-action ====
The Adventures of Pinocchio, 1911

- The Adventures of Pinocchio (1911), a live-action silent film directed by Giulio Antamoro, and the first movie based on the novel. Part of the film is lost.
- Le avventure di Pinocchio (1947), an Italian live action film with Alessandro Tomei as Pinocchio.
- Turlis Abenteuer (1967), an East German version; in 1969 it was dubbed into English and shown in the US as Pinocchio.
- The Adventures of Buratino (1975), a BSSR television film.
- Si Boneka Kayu, Pinokio (1979), an Indonesian movie.
- The Adventures of Pinocchio (1996), a film by Steve Barron starring Martin Landau as Geppetto and Jonathan Taylor Thomas as Pinocchio.
- The New Adventures of Pinocchio (1999), a direct-to-video film sequel of the 1996 movie. Martin Landau reprises his role of Geppetto, while Gabriel Thomson plays Pinocchio.
- Pinocchio (2002), a live-action Italian film directed by, co-written by and starring Roberto Benigni.
- Pinocchio (2013), a live-action German film featuring a computer-animated Pinocchio and female version of the Talking Cricket, given the name, Coco, who used to live in the wood Pinocchio was made out of.
- Pinocchio (2019), a live-action Italian film co-written, directed and co-produced by Matteo Garrone. It stars child actor Federico Ielapi as Pinocchio and Roberto Benigni as Geppetto. Prosthetic makeup was used to turn Ielapi into a puppet. Some actors, including Ielapi, dubbed themselves in the English-language version of the movie.
- Pinocchio (2022), a live-action film based on the 1940 animated Pinocchio. directed and co-written by Robert Zemeckis.
- Pinocchio Unstrung (2026), a live-action horror reimagining of the story in development by Jagged Edge Productions and set in the same universe as Winnie-the-Pooh: Blood and Honey.

==== Animation ====
- The Adventures of Pinocchio (1936), a historically notable, unfinished Italian animated feature film.
- Pinocchio (1940), the widely known Disney animated film, considered by many to be one of the greatest animated films ever made. It is the best-known adaptation of the novel, thanks in part to containing elements that would be used in later adaptations such as Pinocchio being more innocent and good-natured, the Talking Cricket being reworked into a friend and sidekick to Pinocchio, Mangiafuoco being a straight villain, the Fox and the Cat being the ones responsible for most of the story's events, and the Terrible Dogfish being replaced by a whale.
- Pinocchio in Outer Space (1965), Pinocchio has adventures in outer space, with an alien turtle as a friend.
- The Adventures of Pinocchio (1972), Un burattino di nome Pinocchio, literally A puppet named Pinocchio, an Italian animated film written and directed by Giuliano Cenci. Carlo Collodi's grandchildren, Mario and Antonio Lorenzini advised the production.
- Pinocchio and the Emperor of the Night (1987), an animated movie which acts as a sequel of the story.
- Pinocchio (1992), an animated movie by Golden Films.
- Pinocchio 3000 (2004), a science fantasy CGI animated Spanish-Canadian film.
- Bentornato Pinocchio (2007), an Italian animated film directed by Orlando Corradi, which acts as a sequel to the original story. Pinocchio is voiced by Federico Bebi.
- Pinocchio (2012), an Italian-Belgian-French animated film directed by Enzo D'Alò.
- Animated series Ever After High features the daughter of Pinocchio, Cedar Wood.
- Guillermo del Toro's Pinocchio (2022), a stop-motion musical film co-directed by Guillermo del Toro and Mark Gustafson. It is a darker story set in Fascist Italy. It won the Academy Award for Best Animated Feature.

=== Television ===
==== Live-action ====
- Spike Jones portrayed Pinocchio in a satirical version of the story aired 24 April 1954 as an episode of The Spike Jones Show.
- Pinocchio (1957), a TV musical broadcast live during the Golden Age of Television, directed and choreographed by Hanya Holm, and starring such actors as Mickey Rooney (in the title role), Walter Slezak (as Geppetto), Fran Allison (as the Blue Fairy), and Martyn Green (as the Fox). This version featured songs by Alec Wilder and was shown on NBC. It was part of a then-popular trend of musicalizing fantasy stories for television, following the immense success of the Mary Martin Peter Pan, which made its TV debut in 1955.
- The Prince Street Players' musical version, starring John Joy as Pinocchio and David Lile as Geppetto, was broadcast on CBS Television in 1965.
- Pinocchio (1968), a musical version of the story that aired in the United States on NBC, with pop star Peter Noone playing the puppet. This one bore no resemblance to the 1957 television version.
- The Adventures of Pinocchio (1972), a TV mini-series by Italian director Luigi Comencini, starring Andrea Balestri as Pinocchio, Nino Manfredi as Geppetto and Gina Lollobrigida as the Fairy.
- Pinocchio (1976), still another live-action musical version for television, with Sandy Duncan in a trouser role as the puppet, Danny Kaye as Geppetto, and Flip Wilson as the Fox. It was telecast on CBS, and is available on DVD.
- A 1984 episode of Faerie Tale Theatre starring Paul Reubens as Pinocchio.
- Geppetto (2000), a television film broadcast on The Wonderful World of Disney starring Drew Carey in the title role, Seth Adkins as Pinocchio, Brent Spiner as Stromboli, and Julia Louis-Dreyfus as the Blue Fairy.
- Pinocchio (2008), a British-Italian TV film starring Bob Hoskins as Geppetto, Robbie Kay as Pinocchio, Luciana Littizzetto as the Talking Cricket, Violante Placido as the Blue Fairy, Toni Bertorelli as the Fox, Francesco Pannofino as the Cat, Maurizio Donadoni as Mangiafuoco, and Alessandro Gassman as the original author Carlo Collodi.
- Once Upon a Time (2011), ABC television series. Pinocchio and many other characters from the story have major roles in the episodes "That Still Small Voice" and "The Stranger".
- Pinocchio appeared in GEICO's 2014 bad motivational speaker commercial, and was revived in 2019 and 2020 for its Sequels campaign.
- Pinocchio (2014), South Korean television series starring Park Shin-hye and Lee Jong-suk, airs on SBS starting on 12 November 2014, every Wednesdays and Thursdays at 21:55 for 16 episodes. The protagonist Choi In-ha has a chronic symptom called "Pinocchio complex", which makes her break into violent hiccups when she tells lies.

==== Animation ====
- The New Adventures of Pinocchio (1960), a TV series of 5-minute stop-motion animated vignettes by Arthur Rankin, Jr. and Jules Bass. The plots of the vignettes are mainly unrelated to the novel, but the main characters are the same and ideas from the novel are used as backstory.
- Pinocchio: The Series (1972), also known as Saban's The Adventures of Pinocchio and known as Mock of the Oak Tree (樫の木モック, Kashi no Ki Mokku) in Japan, a 52-episode anime is an animated series produced by Tatsunoko Productions. It has a distinctly darker, more sadistic theme, and portrays the main character, Pinocchio (Mokku), as suffering from constant physical and psychological abuse and freak accidents.
- Piccolino no Bōken (1976 animated series) by Nippon Animation as not part of the World Masterpiece Theater
- Pinokio no bōken (1979 TV program) DAX International
- Pinocchio's Christmas (1980), a stop-motion animated TV special.
- The story was adapted in an episode of Simsala Grimm Animated TV series. Season 3, ep. 21. 2010
- The Adventures of Pinocchio was adapted in Happily Ever After: Fairy Tales for Every Child where it takes place on the Barbary Coast.
- Pinocchio and Friends, an Italian-Indian computer-animated television series created by Iginio Straffi, which aired on Rai Yoyo in Italy on 29 November 2021, and on CBeebies in the UK in December 2021.
- The Enchanted Village of Pinocchio (Il villaggio incantato di Pinocchio), an Italian-French computer-animated television series which premiered in Italy on 22 May 2022, on Rai YoYo.

=== Theater ===
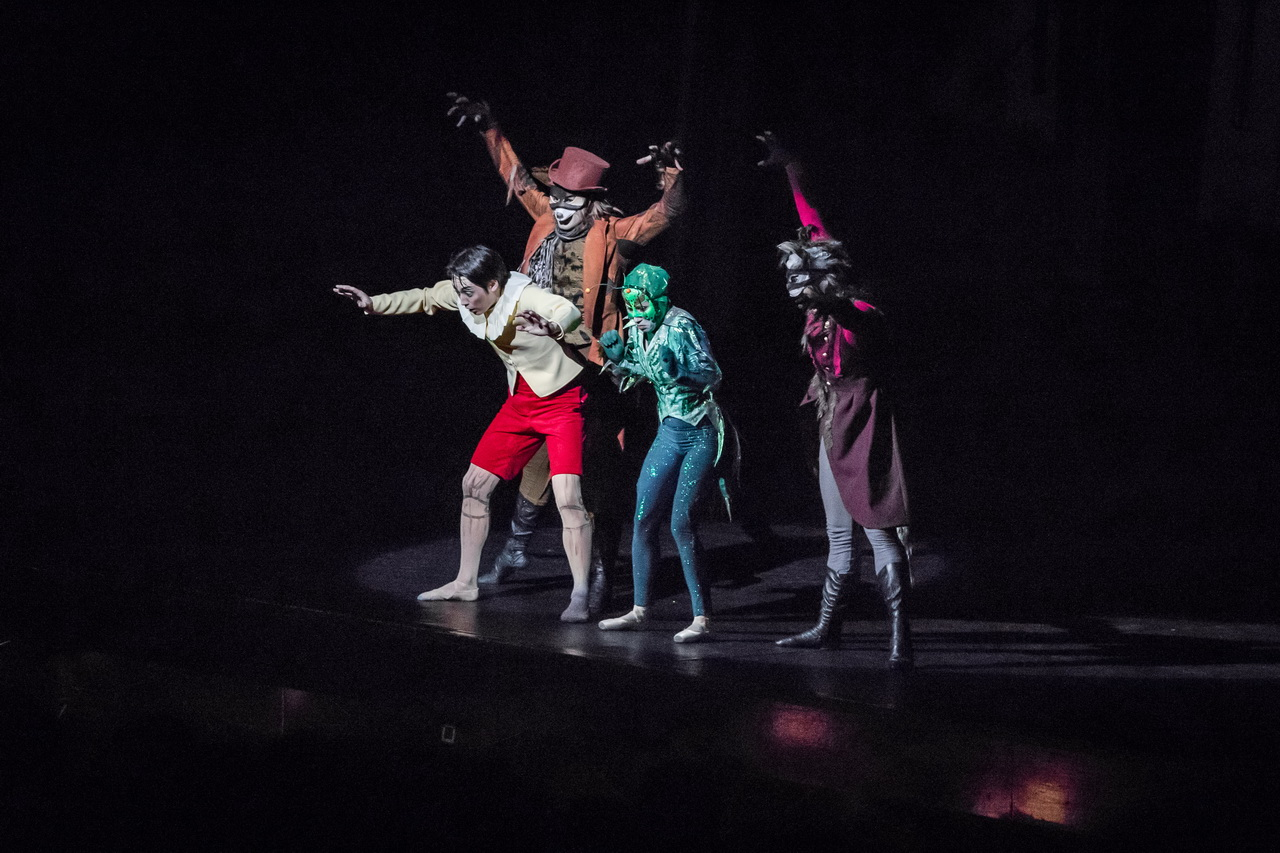
One of numerous stage adaptations of the novel, this one at the Serbian National Theatre (2018)

- "Pinocchio" (1961–1999), by Carmelo Bene.
- John J. Baldwin, Jr., Pinocchio, Pioneer Drama Service, 1970.
- "Pinocchio" (2002), musical by Saverio Marconi and musics by Pooh.
- An opera, The Adventures of Pinocchio, composed by Jonathan Dove to a libretto by Alasdair Middleton, was commissioned by Opera North and premièred at the Grand Theatre in Leeds, England, on 21 December 2007.
- Navok, Lior (2009), opera, "sculptural exhibition. Two acts: actors, woodwind quintet and piano".
- Le Avventure di Pinocchio (2009) musical by Mario Restagno.
- Costantini, Vito (2011), The other Pinocchio, "musical, the first musical sequel to 'Adventures of Pinocchio'". The musical is based on The other Pinocchio, Brescia: La Scuola Editrice, 1999, "book". The composer is Antonio Furioso. Vito Costantini wrote "The other Pinocchio" after the discovery of a few sheets of an old manuscript attributed to Collodi and dated 21/10/1890. The news of the discovery appeared in the major Italian newspapers. It is assumed the Tuscan artist wrote a sequel to 'The Adventures of Pinocchio' he never published. Starting from handwritten sheets, Costantini has reconstructed the second part of the story. In 2000 'The other Pinocchio' won first prize in national children's literature Città of Bitritto.
- La vera storia di Pinocchio raccontata da lui medesimo, (2011) by Flavio Albanese, music by Fiorenzo Carpi, produced by Piccolo Teatro.
- L'altro Pinocchio (2011), musical by Vito Costantini based on L'altro Pinocchio (Editrice La Scuola, Brescia 1999).
- Pinocchio. Storia di un burattino da Carlo Collodi by Massimiliano Finazzer Flory (2012)
- Disney's My Son Pinocchio: Geppetto's Musical Tale (2016), a stage musical based on the 2000 TV movie Geppetto.
- Pinocchio (2017), play by Dennis Kelly, with songs from the 1940 Disney movie, directed by John Tiffany, premiered at the National Theatre, London
- Pinocchio (2025), musical with book and lyrics by Charlie Josephine and music and lyrics by Jim Fortune, directed by Sean Holmes, premiered at Shakespeare's Globe

=== Cultural influence ===
- The Velveteen Rabbit by Margery Williams shares a lot of similarities to Pinocchio with how both involve a toy who gains sentience, gaining the desire to become real, and are granted life by a fairy who makes them become real at the end of their respective stories.
- Totò plays a Pinocchio figure in Toto in Color (1952)
- The Erotic Adventures of Pinocchio, 1971 was advertised with the memorable line, "It's not his nose that grows!"
- Weldon, John (1977), Spinnolio, a parody by National Film Board of Canada.
- The 1990 movie Edward Scissorhands contains elements both of Beauty and Beast, Frankenstein and Pinocchio.
- Pinocchio's Revenge, 1996, a horror movie where Pinocchio supposedly goes on a murderous rampage.
- Android Kikaider was influenced by Pinocchio story.
- Astro Boy (鉄腕アトム, Tetsuwan Atomu) (1952), a Japanese manga series written and illustrated by Osamu Tezuka, recasts loosely the Pinocchio theme.
- Marvel Fairy Tales, a comic book series by C. B. Cebulski, features a retelling of The Adventures of Pinocchio with the robotic superhero called The Vision in the role of Pinocchio.
- Spielberg, Steven (2001), A.I. Artificial Intelligence, film, based on a Stanley Kubrick project that was cut short by Kubrick's death, recasts the Pinocchio theme; in it an android with emotions longs to become a real boy by finding the Blue Fairy, who he hopes will turn him into one.
- Shrek, 2001, Pinocchio is a recurrent supporting character.
- Shrek the Musical, Broadway, 14 December 2008.
- A Tree of Palme, a 2002 anime film, is an interpretation of the Pinocchio tale.
- Teacher's Pet, 2004 contains elements and references of the 1940 adaptation and A.I. Artificial Intelligence.
- Happily N'Ever After 2: Snow White Another Bite @ the Apple, 2009 Pinocchio appears as a secondary character.
- In The Simpsons episode "Itchy and Scratchy Land", there is a parody of Pinocchio called Pinnitchio where Pinnitchio (Itchy) stabs Geppetto (Scratchy) in the eye after he fibs not to tell lies.
- In the Rooster Teeth webtoon RWBY, the characters Penny Polendina and Roman Torchwick are based on Pinocchio and Lampwick respectively.
- He was used as the mascot for the 2013 UCI Road World Championships.
- Pinocchio appears as a lie-detecting android in the short story "The Blue Fairy", found in the sci-fi/fantasy anthology Once Upon a Future Time Volume 4.
- Ergo Proxy includes a major plot element of humanoid automaton ("Autoreivs") becoming self-aware, a prominently featured one is named Pino, which is likely a shortened version of "Pinocchio". Pino has other similarities to Pinocchio, including acting as a surrogate child.

=== Video Games ===
- Lies of P (2023) is a Soulslike video game loosely based on the story and characters of the novel.
- Kingdom Hearts (2002) features the Disney versions of Pinocchio, Geppetto, and Jiminy Cricket as characters, as well as having one of the levels being set inside Monstro's body.

== Related books ==
- Mongiardini-Rembadi, Gemma (1894), Il Segreto di Pinocchio, Italy. Published in the United States in 1913 as Pinocchio under the Sea.
- Cherubini, E. (1903), Pinocchio in Africa, Italy.
- Lorenzini, Paolo (1917), The Heart of Pinocchio, Florence, Italy.
- Patri, Angelo (1928), Pinocchio in America, United States.
- Della Chiesa, Carol (1932), Puppet Parade, New York.
- Tolstoy, Aleksey Nikolayevich (1936), The Golden Key, or the Adventures of Buratino, Russia, a loose adaptation. Illustrated by Alexander Koshkin, translated from Russian by Kathleen Cook-Horujy, Raduga Publishers, Moscow, 1990, 171 pages, SBN 5-05-002843-4. Leonid Vladimirsky later wrote and illustrated a sequel, Buratino in the Emerald City, bringing Buratino to the Magic Land that Alexander Melentyevich Volkov based on the Land of Oz, and which Vladimirski had illustrated.
- Marino, Josef (1940), Hi! Ho! Pinocchio!, United States.
- Coover, Robert (1991), Pinocchio in Venice, "novel, continues the story of Pinocchio, the Blue Fairy, and other characters".
- Dine, James 'Jim' (2006), Pinocchio, Steidl, "illustrations".
- ———— (2007), Pinocchio, PaceWildenstein.
- Winshluss (2008), Pinocchio, Les Requins Marteaux.
- Carter, Scott William (2012), Wooden Bones, "novel, described as the untold story of Pinocchio, with a dark twist. Pino, as he's come to be known after he became a real boy, has discovered that he has the power to bring puppets to life himself".
- Morpurgo, Michael (2013), Pinocchio by Pinocchio Children's book, illustrated by Emma Chichester Clark.
- London, Thomas (2015), Splintered: A Political Fairy Tale sets the characters of the story in modern-day Washington, D.C.
- Bemis, John Claude. Out of Abaton "duology" The Wooden Prince and Lord of Monsters (Disney Hyperion, 2016 and 2017) adapts the story to a science fiction setting.
- Carey, Edward (2021), The Swallowed Man tells the story of Pinocchio's creation and evolution from the viewpoint of Geppetto

== Monuments and art works dedicated to Pinocchio ==
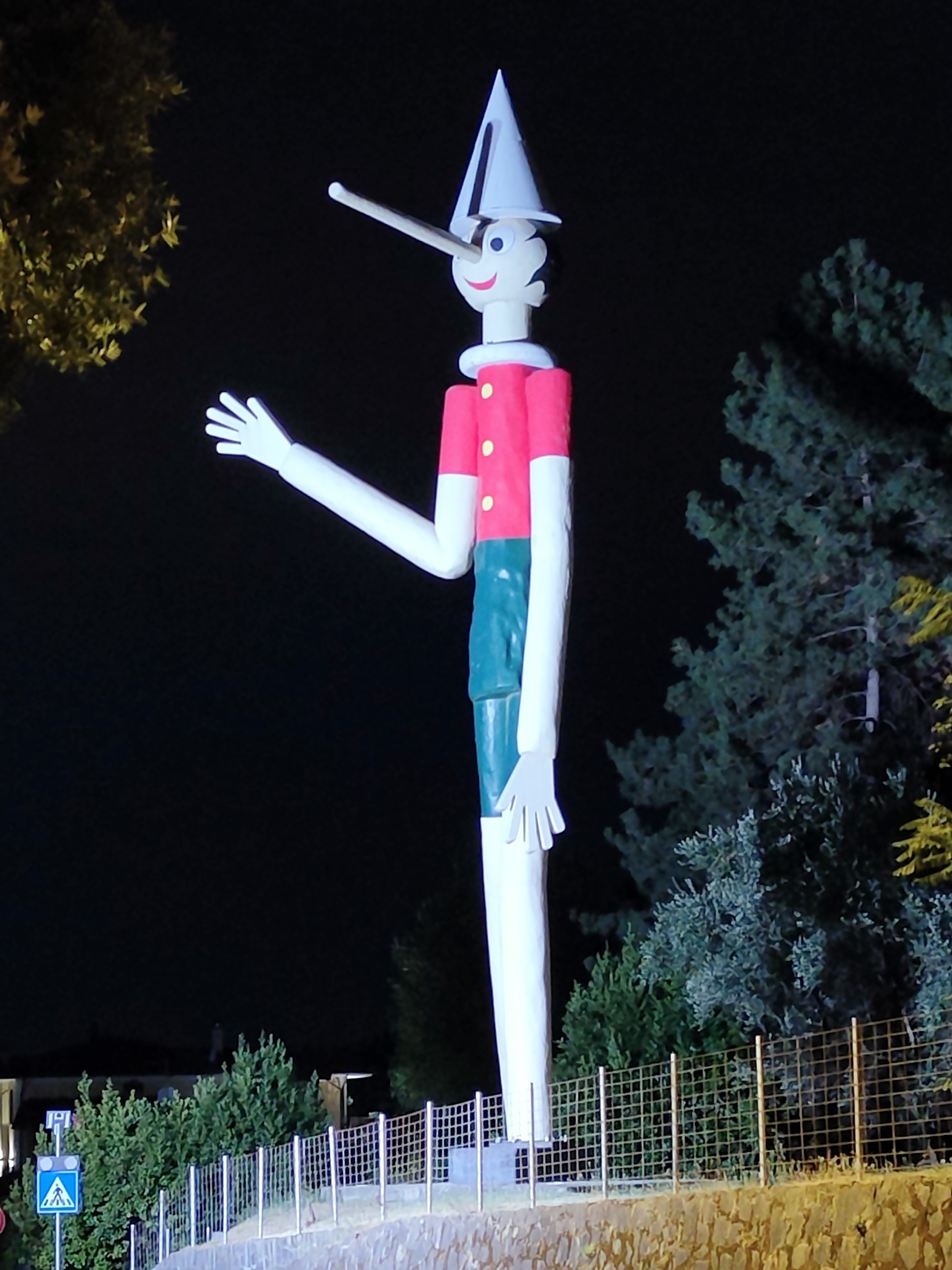
A giant statue of Pinocchio at Parco di Pinocchio (it) in Pescia

- The name of a district of the city of Ancona is "Pinocchio", long before the birth of the famous puppet. Vittorio Morelli built the Monument to Pinocchio.
- Fontana a Pinocchio, 1956, fountain in Milan, with bronze statues of Pinocchio, the Cat, and the Fox.
- In Pescia, Italy, the park "Parco di Pinocchio" was built in 1956.
- Near the Lake Varese was built a metal statue depicting Pinocchio.
- 12927 Pinocchio, a main-belt asteroid discovered on 30 September 1999, by M. Tombelli and L. Tesi at San Marcello Pistoiese, was named after Pinocchio.
- In the paintings series La morte di Pinocchio, Walther Jervolino, an Italian painter and engraver, shows Pinocchio being executed with arrows or decapitated, thus presenting an alternative story ending.
- In the central square of Viù, Turin, there is a wooden statue of Pinocchio which is 6.53 meters tall and weighs about 4000 kilograms.
- In Collodi, the birthplace of the writer of Pinocchio, in February 2009 was installed a statue of the puppet 15 feet tall.
- At the Expo 2010 in Shanghai, in the Italian Pavilion, was exposed to more than two meters tall an aluminum sculpture called Pinocchio Art of Giuseppe Bartolozzi and Clara Thesis.
- The National Foundation Carlo Collodi together with Editions Redberry Art London has presented at the Milan Humanitarian Society the artist's book The Adventures of Pinocchio with the works of Antonio Nocera. The exhibition was part of a Tuscany region food and fable project connected to the Milan Expo 2015.
- Vernante is mostly famous for its Pinocchio's dedicated paintings around the city, which involve the majority of houses in the town's center.

== See also ==
- Pinocchio paradox
- Classic book
- List of best-selling books
