= Walther Jervolino =

Italian painter (1944–2012)

Walter Jervolino
- Born: 1 March 1944; Bondeno, Italy
- Died: 12 July 2012 (aged 68); San Mauro Torinese, Italy
- Education: Giacomo Soffiantino, Mario Calandri
- Known for: Painting, Drawing, Printmaking
- Notable work: "The Babel tower" (1995), "Il collezionista"
- Movement: Surrealism, Hyper-realism
- Spouse: Alessandra Maria Filipello (1950)
- Children: Davide Iervolino (1978)

Walther Jervolino (born Valter Iervolino; 1 March 1944 – 12 July 2012) was an Italian painter and artist, mainly known for his Surrealist works.

== Early life and education ==
Walther Jervolino was born in 1944 in Bondeno, Italy, a small village near Ferrara. His name was in honor of the German doctor who saved his mother's life during his birth. He studied art under Italian realist painters Mario Calandri and Giacomo Soffiantino, favoring oil painting as well as the engraving techniques.

== Career ==
He began his professional career in the late 1960s in Paris, London and in Milan, where he lived for several years. He later perfected his technique in the Roman studio of Riccardo Tommasi Ferroni, one of the major Italian artists. Jervolino subsequently increased his connections with countries throughout Europe, and also lived for long periods in the United States, where he exhibited his works at the Art Expo in New York City, Miami and Los Angeles. Living in such different places—from the hustle and bustle of New York to the pop lights of Miami and the cinematic vibe of Los Angeles—profoundly shaped his art. While keeping the deep, introspective soul of Torinese art, his palette brightened with extraordinary, vivid colors. At the same time, 'collecting' became a central theme in his work: both as mysterious objects piled up inside his paintings, and through his close bond with American collectors, who eagerly competed to buy his pieces. In fact, many of his paintings from that twenty-year period (leading up to the early 2000s) stayed in private collections overseas. This is why a large number of his oil masterpieces can still be found in the United States today

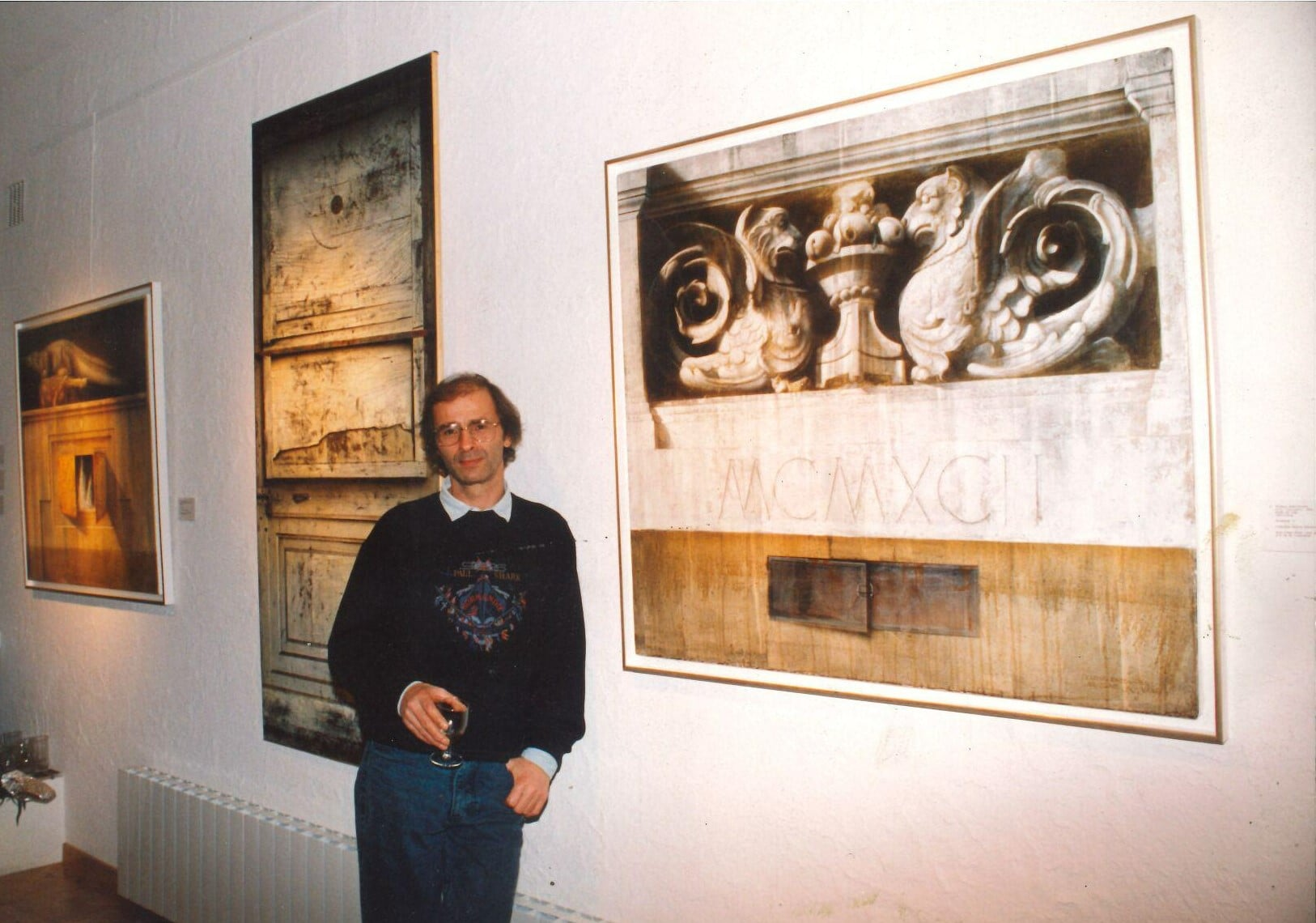
Walther Jervolino posing during an exhibition in Vence, France. 1986.

== Works ==
Walther Jervolino's early works were deeply influenced by the visual style of Giorgio de Chirico, Salvador Dalí and Max Ernst which he later combined with that of several Medieval and Renaissance Painters, such as Hieronymous Bosch and Caravaggio. His technique, derived from years of personal study of Renaissance materials, colours and chemistry together with Postmodern art, produced in the 1980s works such as Gianduja and Giandujotto, The death of Pinocchio, The Collector and The Babel Tower.

His works started to be to appreciated outside Europe. Fluent in English, Jervolino lived both in Italy, where his family lived, and the United States, where many of his paintings were exhibited, receiving several positive reviews in magazines.

In his later period, becoming even more accurate and perfectionist, Walther Jervolino enhanced his engraving techniques and started experimenting with a singular technique where figures or characters come out from the painting during a sort of art performance.

His last works, such as The invisible cities, present a return to the myth and to his first surrealistic oils on canvas.

Most of his works are exhibited at galleries in Europe and the United States.

== "Pinocchio's death" ==
His major work remains A probable death of Pinocchio, a project he had been developing throughout his life. Deeply influenced by the main protagonist of the 1883 children's novel The Adventures of Pinocchio, by Carlo Collodi, he tried to conceive an alternative destiny for Pinocchio, who was guilty, according to Jervolino, of being a traitor to his father, Geppetto. He presented several works depicting Pinocchio being decapitated or murdered with arrows. The hangman who always executes Pinocchio is similar in appearance to Jervolino, thus depicting a personal revenge of the painter against the "devil" Pinocchio.
