= Emma Perodi =

Italian journalist and writer (1850–1918)

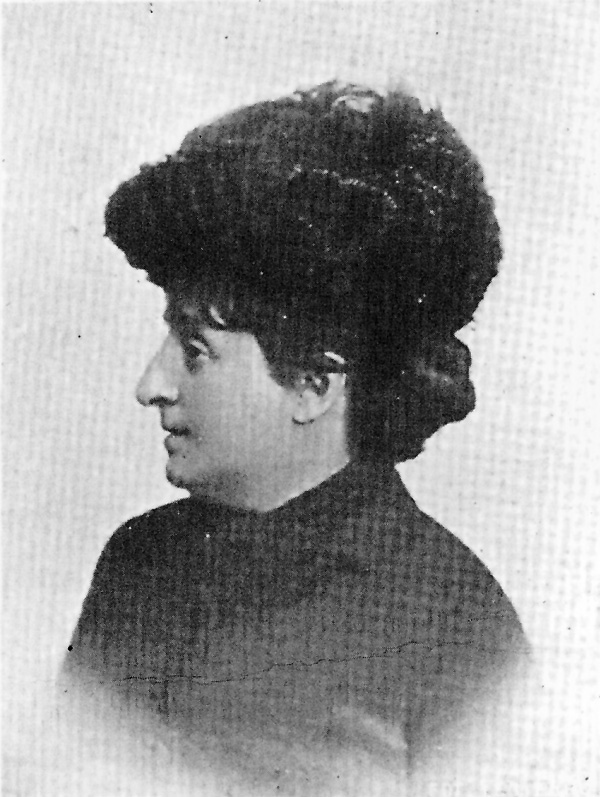
- Born: January 31, 1850; Cerreto Guidi, Grand Duchy of Tuscany
- Died: March 5, 1918 (aged 68); Palermo, Sicily, Italy
- Writing career
- Genre: Children's literature
- Notable work: Le novelle della nonna

Signature
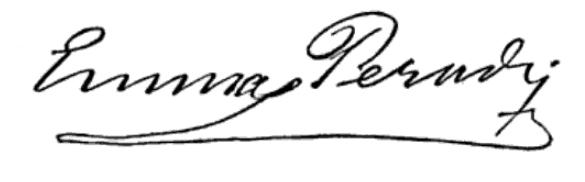

Emma Perodi (31 January 1850 – 5 March 1918) was an Italian writer and journalist, best known for her children's books.

== Biography ==
For many years, it was uncertain if she had been born in Florence or Fiesole but, in the 1980s, a baptismal certificate was found that placed her birth in Cerreto Guidi. Her father, Federigo, was an engineer, and her mother, Adelaide Morelli Adimari had noble origins. She received an expensive education and was allowed the freedom to travel throughout much of Italy and Europe.

Her literary growth, however, took place mainly in Florence. From 1881, she was a collaborator and then, from 1887, director of the Children's Journal (Giornale per i bambini), which was published in Rome. Ferdinando Martini was its founder and first director.

Her best known work is Grandma's Stories (Le novelle della nonna), a collection of fantastic stories set in Casentino, published in installments between 1892 and 1893. Although designed for children, some of the stories contain Gothic elements that can be appreciated by adults. She also did translations; notably the first Italian edition of Elective Affinities by Goethe; in collaboration with Arnaldo de Mohr.

A collection of her stories was published in English under the title Tuscan Tales: The Fantastic Fables of Emma Perodi, trans. Lori Hetherington (2020), ISBN 979-1220076968.

She died from pneumonia in Palermo, where she had spent over twenty years working for the publishing firm of Salvatore Biondo.

In July, 2018, a park in Casentino was dedicated to her.
