= The Adventures of Pinocchio (1911 film) =

1911 Italian film

- Italian: Pinocchio
- Directed by: Giulio Antamoro
- Based on: The Adventures of Pinocchio
- Starring: Ferdinand Guillaume
- Release date: November 1911
- Country: Italy
- Language: Italian

A 6-minute fragment of The Adventures of Pinocchio.

The Adventures of Pinocchio is a 1911 Italian live-action silent film directed by Giulio Antamoro and starring French-Italian comedian Ferdinand Guillaume in an all-adult cast.

It is the first movie based on the 1883 novel The Adventures of Pinocchio by Carlo Collodi, and one of the first Italian feature films.

== Plot ==
Geppetto carves Pinocchio from a large piece of wood. Pinocchio comes to life, causes havoc in the street and his creator Geppetto is arrested while Pinocchio escapes. At home he burns his feet, but is saved by Geppetto, who also gives him new feet.

Pinocchio plays with children and helps them steal fruit. The landowner captures Pinocchio and ties him to a dog house. At night, Pinocchio barks to alert the landowner of some thieves. Grateful for this deed, the landowner gives Pinocchio his freedom back. The thieves, who have been waiting nearby, capture Pinocchio and hang him from a tree. The Turquoise Fairy (La Fata Turchina) saves him from the tree and gives him some money.

Pinocchio meets a Fox and a Cat, who take him to a city of anthropomorphic animals. In the forest they talk him into planting his money in soil and water. Later the Fox and the Cat return to retrieve the money themselves. When Pinocchio returns he discovers that the money is gone, and when he meets the two con artists, a brawl breaks out and Pinocchio is arrested and put in prison. He escapes through the window by tying sheets into a rope.

He swims into the ocean and is swallowed by a whale. In the creature's stomach he finds Geppetto. They escape with the help of Native Americans. At the camp, the Indians hang Geppetto over a fire, but Pinocchio tells them to release him, then tells Geppetto to run home. Later he runs away too, to a camp of Canadian soldiers. The soldiers shoot Pinocchio, riding on a cannonball, all the way home to Geppetto.

Pinocchio joins a puppet theater, but escapes from that too. When he returns home, Geppetto is angry. Pinocchio tries to be a good boy, but his friend Lucignolo talks him into coming along to the Land of Toys, where one never studies but always plays. They are greeted by its waiving inhabitants. After 10 days, they grow donkey ears and eventually turn into donkeys. The Turquoise Fairy changes him back into a puppet.

Pinocchio returns home. Geppetto scolds him but forgives him again. During a meal, the Turquoise Fairy appears and the spirit of Pinocchio takes human form, and the now lifeless puppet falls to the ground.

== Cast ==
The cast of the film was:

- Ferdinand Guillaume as Pinocchio
- Natalino Guillaume as Lucignolo
- Augusto Mastripietri as Geppetto
- Lea Giunchi as the Fairy

== Production ==
It was believed that The Adventures of Pinocchio would be spectacular on the big screen. Ferdinand Guillaume, who at the time was one of the most famous faces in comedy cinema, was selected to portray the protagonist Pinocchio.

The film was produced in a few months. When it was released in Italian cinemas it was a great success, and an abridged version was exported to other countries.

== Lost and found ==
The film was once believed to be a lost film, but in 1994 the original negative was found at Cineteca Italiana in Milan. In 2002, Time reported that a 30-minute version had been rediscovered and restored.

Cineteca Italiana describes the film as the Pinocchio adaptation that is least faithful to the novel, where only some of Collodi's story appears. They also named it the most unsettling, and credited actor Guillaume for this.

== Later screenings ==
In 2018, a screening at the Zorrilla Theatre in Spain was held in which a 42-minute restored version of the silent film was accompanied by live electronic music by the band Miclono.

== Academic interest ==
In 2021, the film was the subject of a thesis by Samuele Picarelli Perrotta of the University of Bologna. The thesis examined the film and how it over time underwent modification and adaptation to contemporary aesthetic tastes.
