= Giulio Antamoro =

Italian film director

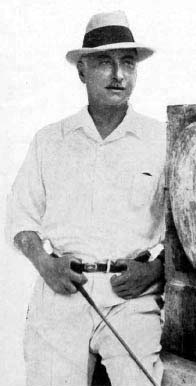
- Giulio Antamoro in a December 1926 publication
- Born: 1 July 1877; Rome, Lazio, Italy
- Died: 8 December 1945 (aged 68); Rome, Lazio, Italy
- Occupation: Director
- Years active: 1910-1943 (film)

Giulio Antamoro (1 July 1877 – 8 December 1945) was an Italian film director mainly active during the silent era.

== Biography ==
Born in 1877 into an aristocratic Roman family, Antamoro began directing for Cines in 1910. Early in his career, he directed several comic short films starring Polidor (Ferdinand Guillaume). Notable in Antamoro's early production is the live-action silent film The Adventures of Pinocchio (1911), the first movie based on the 1883 novel by Carlo Collodi. His first feature films, Sfumatura and Dopo la morte, starring Hesperia, Luciano Molinari and Leda Gys, were released in 1913.

In 1915, Antamoro directed the drama L'avvenire in agguato, based on a story by Roberto Bracco. The film's in-depth character study was met with enthusiastic praise from his contemporaries. The following year, Antamoro directed his most important film, the epic biblical drama Christus. Based on a story by Fausto Salvatori and starring Alberto Pasquali, Amleto Novelli and Leda Gys, it was a massive international success upon its release, establishing Antamoro's reputation as one of Italy's leading filmmakers. Famous for its use of tableaux vivants to recreate famous paintings such as Leonardo da Vinci's The Last Supper, the film featured groundbreaking special effects for the time. The Paris premiere took place at the Trocadéro Palace, the largest available cinema, with the orchestra conducted by the renowned composer Victor Charpentier. Antamoro's Christus is widely considered "a milestone not only in the history of the epic cinema of religious inspiration in Italy, but in the history of the genre as a whole."

In 1919, Antamoro founded Novi Film and became the general director of both I.C.S.A. and Poli Film. While the memory of Christus was still fresh, I.C.S.A. commissioned Antamoro to direct The Passion of St. Francis in 1926, starring Alberto Pasquali and Donatella Gemmò. A few years later, in 1928, Antamoro travelled to Germany to collaborate with the Austrian filmmaker Rudolf Meinert on The Case of Prosecutor M, starring Maria Jacobini and Jean Angelo.

Antamoro is best remembered for his contributions to silent cinema and for developing a film language suited to the demands of sound. Sadly, very little of Antamoro's work survives. His landmark 1916 epic, Christus, was almost entirely lost, but has since been reconstructed from fragments found in various international archives. The restored film was presented at the 57th Venice International Film Festival in 2000. Antamoro's final film, The White Angel (1943), starring Emma Gramatica, Filippo Scelzo and Beatrice Mancini, was directed in collaboration with Ettore Giannini and Federico Sinibaldi. Antamoro died in Rome on 8 December 1945.

== Selected filmography ==
- The Adventures of Pinocchio (1911)
- Sfumatura (1913)
- Dopo la morte (1913)
- L'avvenire in agguato (1915)
- Christus (1916)
- Miss Dorothy (1920)
- Don Carlos (1921)
- La fanciulla di Pompei (1925)
- The Passion of St. Francis (1927)
- The Case of Prosecutor M (1928)
- Saint Anthony of Padua (1931)
- Fanfulla da Lodi (1940)
- The White Angel (1943)

== Bibliography ==
- Nowell-Smith, Geoffrey (1997). The Oxford History of World Cinema. Oxford: Oxford University Press. ISBN 978-0198742425.
- Pucci, Giuseppe (2016). "Christus (Cines, 1916): Italy's first religious Kolossal". In David J. Shepherd (ed.). The Silents of Jesus in the Cinema (1897-1927). New York-London: Routledge. pp. 200–210. doi:10.4324/9781315815169-11.
