= Giacomo Soffiantino =

Italian painter

- Born: 1 January 1929; Turin, Italy
- Died: 27 May 2013 (aged 84); Turin, Italy
- Known for: Painting
- Movement: Abstractism

Giacomo Soffiantino (1 January 1929 – 27 May 2013) was an Italian painter and artist mainly known for his abstract works.

== Career ==
He exhibited at the Venice Biennial in 1956, 1958, 1964, 1972 and at the Rome Quadriennial in 1964 and in 1973.
