= Ferdinand Guillaume =

French-born Italian actor and film director

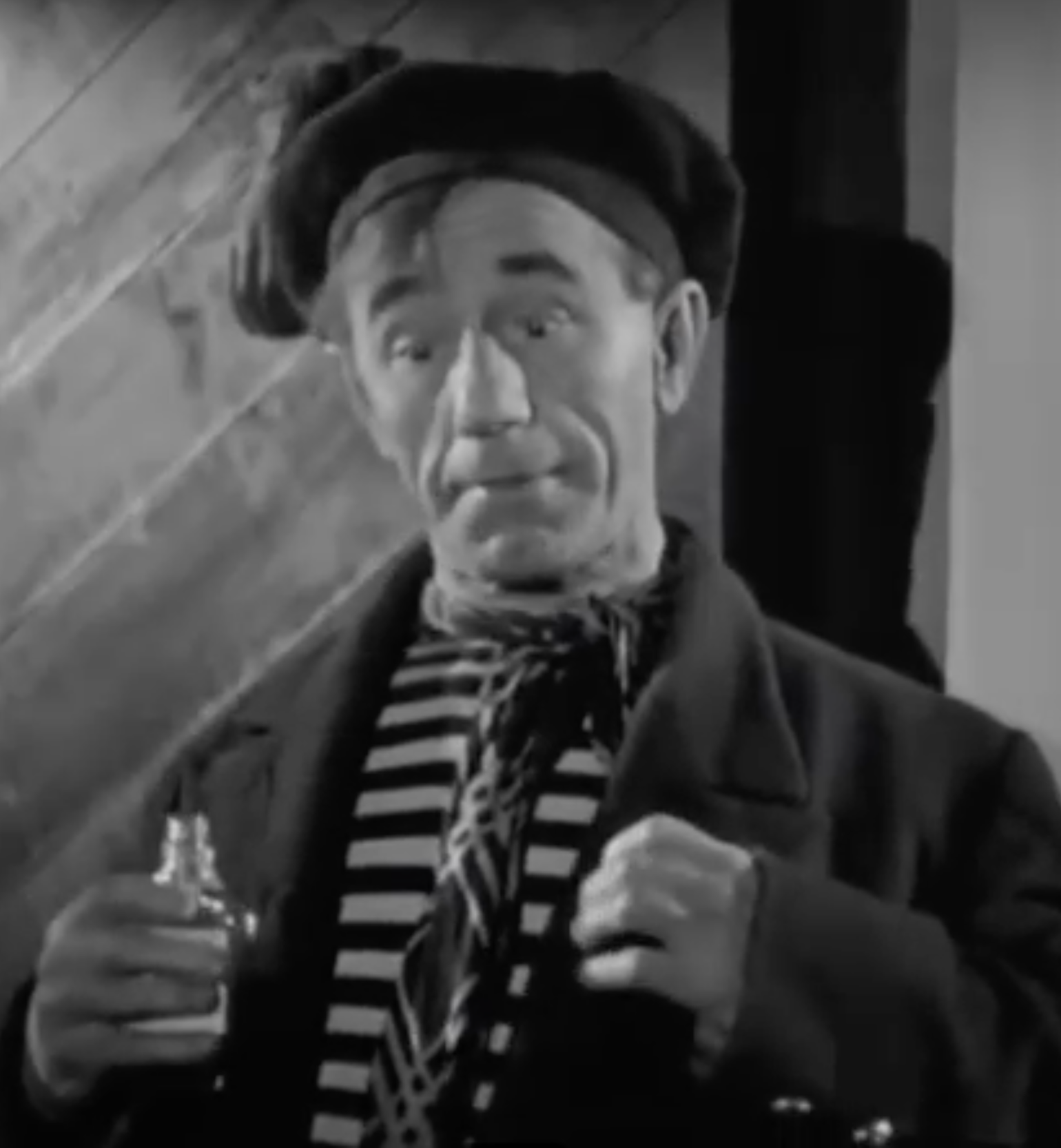
- Guillaume in 1940
- Born: 19 May 1887; Bayonne, France
- Died: 3 December 1977 (aged 90); Viareggio, Italy
- Occupations: Actor, Director
- Years active: 1910–1968 (film)

Ferdinand Guillaume (1887–1977) was a French-born Italian actor and film director. He often is known by his stage name Polidor.

In 1910, after working for years in the family circus, he and his brother Natale were hired by Cines Studios where he starred in over 100 comedy silent shorts billed as the character Tontolini. He then went to work for Pasquali Film in Turin.

== Selected filmography ==
- The Adventures of Pinocchio (1911)
- The Palace on the River (1940)
- The Daughter of the Green Pirate (1940)
- Music on the Run (1943)
- The Mad Marechiaro (1952)
- Angel in a Taxi (1958)
- The Employee (1959)
- Everyone's in Love (1959)
- Accattone (1961)
- Code Name: Red Roses (1968)

== Bibliography ==
- Robert Stam & Alessandra Raengo. A Companion to Literature and Film. John Wiley & Sons, 2008.
