= Scott William Carter =

American fiction writer

- Born: Minnesota
- Education: University of Oregon (BA)
- Occupations: Novelist, short story writer
- Writing career
- Genres: Science fiction Fantasy; Adolescent; Juvenile; Mystery
- Website: www.scottwilliamcarter.com

Scott William Carter is an American fiction writer. He writes in multiple genres, including fantasy, mystery, and young adult.

== Biography ==
Carter was born in Mankato, Minnesota and raised in Salem, Oregon, where he has written most of his books and continues to live. Before becoming a professional writer, Carter owned a bookstore, worked as a ski instructor, and a computer trainer.

Carter attended the University of Oregon, graduating in 1994 with a Bachelor of Arts in English. Currently living in Oregon, he is married and is a father of two children, a daughter and a son.

He won the 2011 Oregon Book Award for Young Adult Literature for his novel, The Last Great Getaway of the Water Balloon Boys. He is also the author of the highly acclaimed Garrison Gage mystery series, among other books.

== Bibliography ==
=== Novels (Garrison Gage series) ===
- The Gray and Guilty Sea (2010)
- A Desperate Place for Dying (2012)
- The Lovely Wicked Rain (2014)
- A Shroud of Tattered Sails (2015)
- A Lighthouse for the Lonely Heart (2017)
- Bury the Dead in Driftwood (2019)
- A Deep and Deadly Undertow (2020)
- A Cold and Shallow Shore (2022)
- A Kiss of Sand and Sorrow (2024)

=== Novels (Myron Vale series) ===
- Ghost Detective (2013)
- The Ghost Who Said Goodbye (2015)
- The Ghost, the Girl, and the Gold (2016)

=== Novels (Karen Pantelli series) ===
- Throwaway Jane (2020)
- Lethal Beauty (2021)
- Dead-Eyed Drifter (2023)

=== Novels (other) ===
- The Last Great Getaway of the Water Balloon Boys (2010)
- President Jock, Vice President Geek (2011)
- Drawing a Dark Way: A Fantasy Adventure (2011)
- A Tale of Two Giants (2011)
- The Care and Feeding of Rubber Chickens (2011)
- Wooden Bones (2012)
- The Castle on the Hill at the Edge of the World (2019)
- The Dragon Lottery (2021)
- Looking for Little Red (2022)

=== Short story collections ===
- The Dinosaur Diaries and Other Tales Across Space and Time (2010)
- A Web of Black Widows (2010)
- The Man Who Made No Mistakes (2013)

=== Short stories (incomplete) ===
- "The Liberators", Analog Science Fiction and Fact (2004) Vol. 124, No. 4.
- "A Christmas in Amber", Analog Science Fiction and Fact (2005) Vol. 125, No. 12.
- "Father Hagerman's Dog", Analog Science Fiction and Fact (2007) Vol. 127, No 6.
- "The Bear Who Sang Opera", Analog Science Fiction and Fact (2009) Vol. 129, No. 7 & 8.
- "The Android Who Became a Human Who Became an Android", Analog Science Fiction and Fact (2010) Vol. 130, No. 7 & 8.
- "A Witness to All That Was". Analog. 131 (7&8): 88–96. July–August 2011.
