= The Sandy Duncan Show =

American television series

- Genre: Sitcom
- Created by: Carl Kleinschmitt
- Starring: Sandy Duncan; Valorie Armstrong; Kathleen Freeman; Henry Beckman; Nita Talbot
- Theme music composer: Dave Grusin; Alan and Marilyn Bergman
- Country of origin: United States
- No. of episodes: 13

Production
- Running time: 30 minutes
- Production company: Paramount Network Television

Original release
- Network: CBS
- Release: September 18 – December 11, 1971

Funny Face and The Sandy Duncan Show are two American sitcoms starring Sandy Duncan that aired on CBS from September 18 to December 11, 1971, and September 17 to December 31, 1972, respectively. In both shows, Duncan played Sandy Stockton, a young woman from a small town attending UCLA to be a teacher and filming commercials on the side to earn money. Although Funny Face was a ratings success, CBS cancelled it at midseason as Duncan recovered from a life-threatening illness. It was overhauled as The Sandy Duncan Show, which failed to build an audience and was cancelled at midseason as well.

== Funny Face ==
=== Plot ===
Sandy Stockton is a UCLA student from Taylorville, Illinois, majoring in education and making ends meet by working part-time as an actress in TV commercials for the Prescott Advertising Agency. In the pilot, the supporting cast includes Nita Talbot as Maggie Prescott, Sandy's modeling agent and best friend, and Frank Aletter as Dick, a photographer for the agency, who also happens to be Maggie's ex-husband. After the pilot, Talbot and Aletter were dropped. The series featured Valorie Armstrong, as Sandy's best friend and neighbor Alice McRaven, and Henry Beckman and Kathleen Freeman, as Pat and Kate Harwell, Sandy's landlords. Beckman had been featured in the pilot as a telephone repairman.

=== Cast ===
==== Main cast ====
- Sandy Duncan as Sandy Stockton
- Valorie Armstrong as Alice McRaven
- Henry Beckman as Pat Harwell
- Kathleen Freeman as Kate Harwell

==== Notable guest cast ====
- Tom Bosley
- Lillian Bronson
- Michael Callan
- Jack De Mave
- Sandra Gould
- Peter Graves
- Jonathan Harris
- Bernie Kopell
- Mike Lookinland
- Monte Markham
- Shelley Morrison
- Benny Rubin
- William Schallert
- Avery Schreiber
- Richard Stahl
- Amzie Strickland
- Ann Morgan Guilbert
- David Doyle

=== Production ===
Before Sandy Duncan made her prime-time television debut, she was a young actress known primarily for her work in theater. She launched her career in New York. She received praise for her performances at City Center in 1966–1967 and Tony Award nominations for her roles in the musical Canterbury Tales (1969) and the revival of the musical The Boy Friend (1970), her breakout performance. In 1970 she signed for her film debut in Disney's The Million Dollar Duck, for which she would receive positive reviews. Around the same time her face became widely known in California through her humorous portrayal of a harried young bank teller patiently dealing with difficult customers in a series of UCB (United California Bank) commercials. Through these projects, she became typecast as a cute, perky, slightly nutty all-American sweetheart, an image she would find hard to shed.

Fred Silverman, a young television executive recently promoted to vice president, programs, at CBS Television, saw Duncan in The Boy Friend and believed she could be a television star. In summer 1970, he signed her to a deal that included a commitment to film a pilot for the 1971–1972 television season. At the time he was in the midst of a radical overhaul of CBS's prime-time schedule that involved dropping the network's rural comedies and variety shows and adding more sophisticated programs to attract the young, urban viewers advertisers desired—what became known as the "rural purge." Variety reported that CBS was developing five properties for Duncan. It eventually settled on a sitcom loosely inspired by the Paramount film Funny Face (1957), which stars Audrey Hepburn. Paramount Television had originally developed this project for Sandra Dee a few years prior and sent it to Silverman as a vehicle for Melba Moore, but he believed the role suited Duncan better. During development, the show's premise was tailored to Duncan's own life: Like Duncan, Sandy Stockton, the character she played, was a young woman from a small town who moved to a large city and became famous for her work in television commercials.

Silverman personally shepherded Funny Face, but conflicts between CBS and Carl Kleinschmitt, the show's creator and producer, undermined it from the beginning. Production of the pilot began in November 1970. In the pilot, Duncan's character Sandy Stockton must choose between a date with a shy bookstore clerk and a photo assignment. Kleinschmitt commented that it "compounded cotton candy on top of sugar." After Silverman viewed it and the second episode, he shut down production for four weeks: "They were turning Sandy Duncan into Mary Poppins, for Christ's sakes. Show would have been a failure. It'll cost us $100,000 to shut down, but it'll be worth it because the scripts will improve." In May 1971, The Hollywood Reporter reported that the pilot would not be the series premiere (it ultimately aired as the last episode) and that the show would emphasize Sandy Stockton's life at UCLA more than her acting career.

After the pilot was filmed, conflicts between Silverman and Kleinschmitt persisted. Silverman insisted that television viewers tuned in to see stars and that the show's success therefore hinged on Duncan. Kleinschmitt, by contrast, wanted to develop the supporting cast, as the producers of The Mary Tyler Moore Show had done with great success; yet, the network objected. As scripts were continually rewritten, the supporting cast fluctuated—Sandy Stockton's agent and photographer were dropped after the pilot; her landlords were introduced to replace them and then deemphasized; and eventually her neighbor and friend Alice became more central. In October 1971, after several episodes had been filmed, The Hollywood Reporter stated that the landlords would be replaced by "a former middle linebacker who wears an apron and does domestic duties at home," while his wife "goes to work every day as a technical analyst in a systems corporation."

Shortly after filming of the series began on June 2, 1971, Duncan began to develop headaches, excruciating pain in her left eye, and weight loss (her weight dropped from about 105 pounds to the 80s). Journalists often described her as looking tired or frail. At first she attributed her condition to stress: She knew the show's success depended on her, but did not feel confident enough to assert herself. After the series ended, she commented: "The network couldn't make up its mind how it ought to go. A script that was fine one week was unacceptable the next. It was change, change, change. Adjust, adjust, adjust. And it was all on my shoulders, they said." Her husband Bruce Scott stated that she was unhappy with how the series was going. At the end of August she was hospitalized at Mt. Sinai Hospital in Los Angeles for what was described as a "collapse" and a "minor eye ailment." Eventually, she was diagnosed with inflammation of the optic nerve and given cortisone injections. Yet, her health worsened. At the same time, her marriage deteriorated. She separated from Scott in August, and on October 13 filed for divorce. Days later she was admitted to UCLA Medical Center for tests. Using new X-ray technology, her neurologist discovered a fibroid tumor the size of a walnut behind her left eye. On November 1 she had surgery to remove the tumor, which was benign.

Up to the time she was hospitalized at UCLA, Duncan continued to work on Funny Face, which premiered on September 18, 1971, as one of eight new shows on CBS's prime-time schedule. Silverman placed it on Saturday night at 8:30 pm, slotting it and another new sitcom, The New Dick Van Dyke Show at 9 pm, between two hit series that attracted young, urban audiences—All in the Family at 8 pm and The Mary Tyler Moore Show at 9:30 pm, followed by Mission Impossible at 10 pm. Yet, while Funny Face benefited from being sandwiched in this lineup, it seemed conventional in comparison to the other shows. Before the show premiered, Duncan herself said there was nothing new or different about it, and after it ended, she characterized it as old-fashioned. Even Silverman said that his boss Bob Wood bet him that it would flop. In an interview decades later, he admitted that it was "a dog … it wasn't any good … just awful."

Nevertheless, Funny Face was an immediate ratings success. Despite this success, it was cancelled in November 1971 because of Duncan's illness. At the time, only 13 episodes had been filmed. Silverman and Paramount stated that their concern for Duncan motivated the cancellation and that a new series starring the actress would be developed for the 1972–1973 season. Duncan's first appearance on national television after her surgery was on the January 4, 1972 episode of The Dick Cavett Show. Wearing large glasses and a wig to cover the scar on her head, she announced she had recovered but was permanently blind in her left eye. For her many years false rumors circulated that she had a glass eye.

=== Reception ===
Funny Face was the most highly rated new comedy of the 1971–1972 season. For the week ending September 19, 1971, it ranked 20. It continued to perform well in the following weeks. For example, for the week ending September 26, it ranked 6; October 3: 18; October 10: 13; October 17: 11; October 24: 18; October 31: 15; and November 7: 7. At the end of the season, it ranked as the eighth most popular show of the season with a rating of 23.9.

Despite its popular success, initial reviews of Funny Face were mostly negative. In a full-page review in TV Guide, Cleveland Amory declared: "The fact is, the show is thin. Good as Miss Duncan is, she is in almost every single bit of the humor. Too often it's just too much. Before the end of the show, you get tired of the effort, if not of her." The New York Times panned the show: "'Funny Face' is constructed as a showcase for Sandy Duncan, an attractive performer whose particular brand of cuteness monopolized the reviews in a recent Broadway revival of 'The Boy Friend.' The TV problem is how to harness that cuteness without falling into the sticky Doris Day pit, how to make Sandy a cutely gutsy version of 'real people.' The opening episode … didn't succeed. Sandy just looked tired, or perhaps a bit bored." The Hollywood Reporter opined: "Sadly but surely, Sandy Duncan's new series 'Funny Face' is one of the biggest disappointments of the '71–'72 television season. Her performance, except when she delivers commercials within the program, is wooden, lacking the sparkle, charm and vitality that had viewers skipping refrigerator breaks to see her on bank ads." Variety declared: "Newcomer 'Funny Face' is, at the moment, all Sandy Duncan. Big-eyed, frail, wholesome, peppy and spunky, she projects the image of the smalltown ex-cheerleader loose in the big city—and apparently that image is the peg the series is hung on. Unless someone finds a way to turn on some laughs, that 'hung on' could turn into 'hung up on' quite rapidly." Life stated: "She deserves better … from the joyboys at CBS who 'packaged' such a 'valuable property' into such a mediocre sitcom. That Funny Face appears to be doing well in the ratings is a triumph of individual talent over corporate witlessness." By contrast, the Los Angeles Times was more enthusiastic: "Funny Face is a delight. Sandy Duncan, starring in her first TV series, is wide-eyed, eager, innocent, bright, and completely adorable. The script is light and snappy."

On December 13, 1971, Duncan accepted the female Newcomer of the Year Award given by the Hollywood Women's Press Club, proclaiming: "I came here with two commercials to my credit … Lots has happened since." In 1972, she was nominated for an Emmy Award for Outstanding Continued Performance by an Actress in a Leading Role in a Comedy Series for her role in Funny Face. She was also nominated for two Golden Globe Awards as New Star of the Year—Actress for The Million Dollar Duck and as Actress in a Leading Role—Musical or Comedy for Star Spangled Girl. That same year she was honored by the Hollywood Radio and Television Society at its International Broadcasting Awards Presentation Dinner as Woman of the Year. On May 20, 1972, she was given a gala celebration in Taylorville, Illinois, the character Sandy Stockton's hometown, where a street named Sandy Duncan Drive was dedicated to her and Illinois governor Richard B. Ogilvie declared that day to be Sandy Duncan Day.

== The Sandy Duncan Show ==
The Sandy Duncan Show
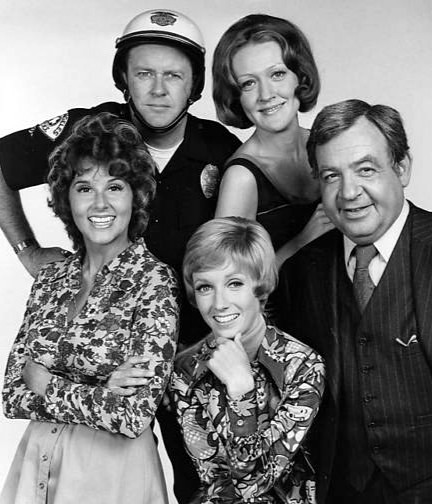
- The Sandy Duncan Show cast (1972). Front, L-R: Pam Zarit, Sandy Duncan, Tom Bosley. Back: M. Emmet Walsh, Marian Mercer
- Genre: Sitcom
- Created by: Carl Kleinschmitt (developed by Arne Sultan and Earl Barret)
- Starring: Sandy Duncan; Tom Bosley; Marian Mercer; Pamela Zarit; Alfie Wise; Eric Christmas; M. Emmet Walsh
- Theme music composer: Dave Grusin; Alan Bergman; Marilyn Bergman
- Composer: Pat Williams
- Country of origin: United States
- No. of episodes: 13

Production
- Running time: 30 minutes
- Production companies: Paramount Network Television, in association with Jefferson/Sultan Productions, Inc.

Original release
- Network: CBS
- Release: September 17 – December 31, 1972

=== Plot ===
In The Sandy Duncan Show, Sandy now works for the advertising firm of Quinn & Cohen, where her supervisor is one of the partners, Bert Quinn (Tom Bosley). The other partner is Bert's son, Leonard Cohen (Alfie Wise); the receptionist is Hilary (Pam Zarit). Two of her neighbors, Kay Fox (Marian Mercer) and Alex Lembeck (M. Emmet Walsh) are also close friends. Motorcycle police officer Alex constantly worries about Sandy's status as a single woman living alone, which he sees as being inherently dangerous; and as such, appoints himself as her chaperone/protector. Sandy has a sweet and slightly naive nature and is prone to trying to help anyone who she feels needs help, including total strangers.

=== Cast ===
==== Main cast ====
- Sandy Duncan as Sandy Stockton
- Tom Bosley as Bert Quinn
- Alfie Wise as Leonard Cohen
- Pam Zarit as Hilary
- Marian Mercer as Kay Fox
- M. Emmet Walsh at Alex Lembeck
- Eric Christmas as Ben Hampton, the handyman in Sandy's apartment building

==== Notable guest cast ====
- John Barbour
- Cesare Danova
- Marty Feldman
- John Hillerman
- Charles Lane
- Barry Livingston
- Cliff Osmond
- Marge Redmond
- Ron Rifkin
- Martha Scott

=== Production ===
For the 1972–1973 television season, Funny Face was reimagined as The Sandy Duncan Show. Arne Sultan replaced Jerry Davis as executive producer, and Earl Barret replaced Carl Kleinschmitt as producer. Recognizing that Funny Face was out of step with the more sophisticated sitcoms that Silverman admired, Sultan strived to make the new show more honest and mature. In a press conference in the summer of 1972, he proclaimed: "'Funny Face' … was awfully old-fashioned in a year when 'All in the Family' and 'Mary Tyler Moore' were doing realistic comedy. … It's our intention to elevate the show. To give it a mature look and make it a hell of a lot funnier." Like many of those shows, it would be filmed before a live audience using the three-camera technique. Sandy Stockton was still the lead character, but the premise of the show was changed. In addition to being a college student who acts in commercials on the side, she also works as a secretary at her agency. The entire supporting cast was replaced. Sandy Stockton even got a new wardrobe, bought off the rack, which the show's costumer Anne Laune said was intended to give the character "the modern business girl look her role calls for."

In 1972 CBS announced that The Sandy Duncan Show would be scheduled for 8:30 pm Sunday, after Anna and the King at 7:30 pm and M*A*S*H at 8 pm and before The New Dick Van Dyke Show at 9 pm and Mannix at 9:30 pm. However, it was unable to build an audience and was cancelled in November. Years later Duncan observed that "they fixed what was a hit, and it wasn't very good."

=== Reception ===
Ratings for The Sandy Duncan Show were consistently poor. For example, for the week ending September 17, 1972, the show ranked 32 in the MNA (Multi-Network Area) Nielsens; September 24: 36; October 1: episode preempted; October 8: 49; October 15: 42; October 22: 50; October 29: episode preempted; November 5: 53; November 12: 49; and November 19: 36.

Reviews of The Sandy Duncan Show were also poor. Variety commented: "A 12-year-old was able to recognize the new 'Sandy Duncan Show' as a bushleague imitation of the 'Mary Tyler Moore Show.' True, that's a hard show to equal, but this one misses completely. Cute she is, but Sandy Duncan isn't strong enough talent to carry an ailing series." The Los Angeles Times stated: "Sandy was back. In another bomb. … This one, filmed in front of an audience in the three-camera technique, may be worse than the other, despite the considerable talents of Tom Bosley …. It's hard to believe but the able Arne Sultan and Earl Barret put this together with, I imagine, a lot of unwanted help from the CBS brass." The New York Post declared: "It's old sitcom stuff on the viewing box, utterly bereft of imagination." The Buffalo Evening News proclaimed: "[I]t is now one of the squarest items to hit the small screen in 1972. … Alas, Sandy's season opener is neither new nor good."

== Theme song and opening titles ==
Both Funny Face and The Sandy Duncan Show use the same theme song and opening titles. The opening titles consist of a photo album with pictures of Sandy Stockton as she was growing up from infancy to a young woman (presumably real-life photos of Duncan, used for the montage). Included are pictures of Sandy at various young ages; also pictures of her doing tap and ballet dancing; at various school functions; being a cheerleader for her high school; wearing her cap and gown, and posing by the Taylorville sign saying good bye as she is boarding her bus.

However, in The Sandy Duncan Show's opening, most of the pictures of a baby Sandy were eliminated, as there is now a second verse of the song, and that second verse is sung while showing Sandy on her bus trip from Taylorville to Los Angeles (which is actually footage of Duncan from her 1971 Paramount film 'Star Spangled Girl). In Funny Face, the theme song "The Kind of Girl She Is" is sung by Jack Jones and later on in The Sandy Duncan Show, a more up-tempo version of the theme is sung by an uncredited group. The theme was written by Alan and Marilyn Bergman and Dave Grusin.

== Episodes ==
=== Funny Face ===
No.	Title	Directed by	Written by	Original release date
1	"The Used Car"	Hal Cooper	Bob Rodgers	September 18, 1971
When Sandy visits used-car dealer John E. Appleseed (Tom Bosley), he recognizes her from a television commercial and offers her a free car if she will do a series of live commercials for him on The Late Late Show. During the first one, directed by young David Damon (Daniel Spelling Jr.), she begins to ad lib, revealing the car she is touting has a flat tire. John fires her but rehires her when customers deluge the dealership because of Sandy's honesty. At the end of an exhausting week, Sandy is approached by a poor couple (Matt Clark as George Domka and Cynthia Hull as Sue Ellen Domka) who trusted her and bought a car that immediately broke down. She promises to help them, but John refuses to fix the car. During her last commercial, Sandy announces that if anyone is having a problem with a car bought at John's dealership, he will fix it. In retaliation, John reneges on his promise to give her a free car, but then gifts her a convertible after she insists. Unfortunately, the car does not start. This episode also features Valorie Armstrong as Alice and Kathleen Freeman and Henry Beckham as Sandy's landlords.
2	"A Lesson in Courage"	Richard Michaels	Dick Bensfield & Perry Grant	September 25, 1971
Sandy’s lecture on courage to her landlord Pat's 10-year-old nephew, Billy (Gene Andrusco), who is afraid of playing football, leaves her up in the air when she must prove her own bravery by jumping from a plane for a hair-spray commercial. Other guest stars include Peter Kastner as her agent, Roger, and Joe Perry as her skydiving instructor, Al.
3	"No Music, Maestro, Please?"	Unknown	Unknown	October 2, 1971
Against the wishes of her principal (Raymond Bailey), Sandy attempts to inspire her lackluster grammar-school band students by entering them in a television contest and then decides to hold secret rehearsals in her apartment because the principal has banned extracurricular activities. Other guest stars include Arnie Yellin as David and Jeff Whipple as Nelson.
4	"Drive? Who Said?"	Unknown	Unknown	October 9, 1971
Sandy gets a job in a rent-a-car commercial but has to learn how to drive in twenty-four hours at the Cut-Rate Inexpensive Driving School.
5	"The Repairman Cheateth"	William Wiard	Albert E. Lewin	October 16, 1971
After Sandy begins feuding with an unscrupulous television repairman (Bernie Kopell), she goes to jail for disturbing the peace and other charges. Other guest stars include Ben Cooper as the lawyer.
6	"A Star Is Born—on a Stretcher"	Peter Baldwin	Ron Friedman	October 23, 1971
Sandy meets an agent named Manny (Avery Schreiber), who arranges for her to audition for a small role on Mission Impossible. At Paramount Studios, she runs into Peter Graves, who plays himself, and causes him to crash his bicycle; but he likes her, and she lands the part on his recommendation. While on set, the director, Mr. Wellington (Richard Stahl), cuts her only line, and then she must endure multiple takes with a music box that keeps exploding in her face. Even though Graves tells her that she can quit, she agrees to finish the job for both him and Manny. Other guest stars include Bobby W. Hoffmann as Mike, the production assistant, and Haven Earle Haley as the makeup artist. (Mission Impossible and Funny Face both aired on CBS on Saturday nights.)
7	"The Marrying Kind"	Ed Swackhamer	Unknown	October 30, 1971
Sandy has a date with college track star Will Titus (John Fink), who takes her out to see Bambi and then to have ice cream. He seems to be a harmless square, but she learns from Alice (Valorie Armstrong) that he is known as William the Conquerer because he has a reputation as a campus wolf. Other guest stars include Tom Hallick as Ted and David Doyle as DeHaven.
8	"What's in a Mouth"	Unknown	Unknown	November 6, 1971
After an emergency visit to a doddering dentist (William Schallert), Sandy can control only half of her face when she reports for work on a coffee commercial.
9	"Four Sided Triangle"	Unknown	Unknown	November 13, 1971
Sandy’s leading man (Monte Markham) in a tea commercial wants to date both her and Alice (Valorie Armstrong); a four-sided “triangle” is formed when his mysterious “twin” brother gets involved. Other guest stars include Tommy Farrell as the director.
10	"Don't Worry, I'll Manage"	Hal Cooper	Susan Silver	November 20, 1971
While her landlords are away, Sandy agrees to manage the apartment building for the weekend. However, she becomes overwhelmed with multiple problems, including telling a boy named Billy (Bobby Scott Kilden) that he cannot keep his dog because pets are not allowed; painting the front door of Mrs. Jensen (Holly Irving); trying to repair the garbage disposal of Mrs. Carter (Patty Regan); leasing the same vacant apartment to Mrs. Morris (Lillian Bronson), an elderly woman who seems unable to pay, and to Mr. Randolph (Benny Rubin), an elderly man; and attempting to fix a leaking pipe in the laundry room.
11	"A Crush on Sandy"	Richard Michaels	Austin and Irma Kalish	November 27, 1971
Sandy begins receiving a series of gifts from a secret admirer. She deduces that he is Richie Stone (Mike Lookinland), a student in her second-grade class. Richie, who is motherless, tells her that his father Ken (Michael Callan) would like to invite her to their home for dinner. However, the invitation is really a scheme he has concocted to bring Sandy and Ken together: He does not want his father to marry his fiancée Carol (Patricia Harty) because he doubts he has shed his playboy lifestyle. The scheme almost works when Carol shows up and assumes that Sandy and Ken are having a romantic date. Sandy and Ken straighten out the situation, and Ken invites Sandy to the wedding. On the wedding day, Sandy reassures Richie that Carol will be a loving mother, but when the wedding ring gets stuck on Sandy's finger, the ceremony almost grinds to a halt. Other guest stars include Amzie Strickland as Mrs. Hayes and Milton Parsons as the minister.
12	"Captain Wonderful"	Unknown	Unknown	December 4, 1971
Captain Wonderful (Jonathan Harris) is an egomaniacal children’s television host who is trying to avoid Sandy’s request to headline her school’s benefit show. Other guest stars include Sandra Gould as Mrs. Walden, Shelley Morrison as Mrs. Martinez, Phil Leeds as Coleman, and Maidie Norman as Mrs. Johnson.
13	"Pilot"	Jerry Paris	Carl Kleinschmitt	December 11, 1971
This episode is the original pilot for the series, aired for the first time. Sandy has a telephone installed in her apartment. Her first call is from an anonymous admirer who asks for a date. At the student bookstore, she realizes that the caller is a shy, insecure clerk named Howard Dalyrimple (Elliott Street) and agrees to go out with him. Her agent Maggie Prescott (Nita Talbot) tells her she has arranged a publicity shoot for the same night with movie star Ron Roland (Jack De Mave) and expects her to attend. Sandy regretfully breaks her date with Howard, knowing he will be hurt. Sandy, Maggie, photographer Dick (Frank Aletter), and Ron go to a hip club. As egotistical Ron's behavior becomes increasingly obnoxious, Sandy leaves to meet Howard at a campus party. When the other students see Howard with Sandy, he suddenly becomes popular and is grateful to Sandy for boosting his self-confidence. Other guest stars include Henry Beckman as the telephone repairman and Jackson Bostwick as the football hero. Screenplay suggested by Leonard Gershe, who wrote the screenplay for the film Funny Face.

=== The Sandy Duncan Show ===
The list of episodes in the table below follows the order in the record for this show on IMDb. However, there are discrepancies between this order and contemporary publications such as TV Guide.

No.	Title	Original release date
1	"Hooray for Harriet"	September 17, 1972
Sandy arranges a blind date between her boss Bert Quinn (Tom Bosley) and her disconsolate Aunt Harriet (Martha Scott), whose husband has just left her after 30 years of marriage; when Aunt Harriet wakes up in Bert’s bed wearing his pajamas, she mistakenly concludes that she has been seduced. Directed by George Tyne; written by Norman Belkin and Harriet Belkin.
2	"Richer III"	September 24, 1972
Sandy starts dating Richard Hardington III (Keith Charles), a rich playboy who becomes enchanted with her after he sees her on a television commercial. To discern whether she likes him only for his money, his attorney Lester Ellsworth (Donald Woods) tells her that he is an imposter. Other guest stars include Jack Bernardi as the florist and Mel Bishop as the delivery man. Directed by Dan Dailey; written by Albert E. Lewin.
3	"For the Man Who Has Almost Anything"	October 8, 1972
Sandy volunteers to secretly tutor her boss Bert (Tom Bosley) at night so that he can pass the exam for his high school diploma, but her friends and neighbors think that they are having a romance.
4	"The Importance of Being Ernestine"	October 15, 1972
After Sandy obtains a new phone number, she becomes the fourth member of an “eternal triangle” when she gets a rash of calls from a man who thinks she is his girlfriend Ernestine, who formerly held the number. Guest stars include Vivian Bonnell as Louise, Edmund Cambridge as George, Aldine King as Ernestine, and Dave Turner as Jefferson.
5	"Knock on Any Door"	October 22, 1972
Marty Feldman guest stars as a smooth-talking but bungling burglar who gets locked in Sandy's apartment. Directed by Peter Baldwin; written by Arne Sultan and Earl Barret.
6	"Play It Again Samuelson"	November 5, 1972
Criminal charges and process servers haunt hapless Sandy after she mistakenly nails a purse snatcher. Guest stars include Abe Vigoda as Mr. Samuelson, Dodo Denney as Mrs. Samuelson, John Hillerman as Plessey, Charles Lane as the judge, Honey Sanders as Alice, and Gloria LeRoy as Ginger.
7	"The Seven Hour Itch"	November 12, 1972
Opportunity comes knocking at Sandy’s door when she is selected to be the Bubbles Galore girl in a commercial for a new bubble bath that has one unpleasant side effect—she’s allergic to it.
8	"Big Little Man"	November 19, 1972
Sandy inherits a delicate situation. Her neighbor Alex’s nephew Walter (Barry Livingston), a 15-year-old boy genius, plans to propose to her, but she decides to beat him to the punch in hopes of discouraging him.
9	"Hold Your Hoarse"	November 26, 1972
In this flashback episode, Sandy tells Hilary (Pam Zarit) how she came to work at Quinn & Cohen. Seeking an agent, she interviewed with Bert (Tom Bosley) and Leonard (Alfie Wise), who sent her to test for a commercial for Expose perfume, even though she told them she had laryngitis. She landed the commercial, in which she played a sensual spy, because the director (Eugene Troobnick) liked her throaty voice. After her voice returned to normal, she feared she would lose the role and asked her doctor (Byron Webster) how she could contract laryngitis overnight. Mystified, he told her to talk a lot. However, she droned on to her neighbors Kay (Marian Mercer) and Alex (M. Emmet Walsh) for so long that she completely lost her voice, so the director rewrote the script so that she did not have to speak. The commercial was a success, but it never aired because the company went bankrupt. In consolation, Bert offered her a job as part-time secretary at the agency. Other guest stars include Eric Christmas as Ben Hampton, John van Dreelen as Le Moko, Cliff Osmond as the bartender, and Johnny Silver as the slate man. Directed by Gary Nelson; written by Arne Sultan and Earl Barret.
10	"Doctor New"	December 10, 1972
Kay (Marian Mercer) thinks that her cousin Warren (Ron Rifkin), a brand-new dentist who is very clumsy, would be a good match for Sandy. They come to Sandy's apartment for dinner. During the meal, Sandy develops a toothache. Warren offers to treat her, but she distrusts his competence. Instead of telling him the truth, she tries to avoid destroying his confidence by telling him that she has to fly to San Francisco. When she goes to Dr. Reams (Byron Morrow) for the root canal that she needs, she is surprised to find that Warren is serving as his assistant. She confesses to Warren that she lied to him to avoid hurting his feelings. After Dr. Reams breaks his glasses, Warren ends up performing the procedure himself, and it is a great success. Directed by Dan Dailey; written by Charlotte Brown. Also features Eric Christmas as Ben Hampton.
11	"Write On"	December 17, 1972
A budding novelist’s delicate ego is the problem in this tale about a literary disaster written by Sandy’s neighbor.
12	"From Rags to Riches to Rags"	December 24, 1972
A bank error results in Sandy’s suddenly becoming $10,000 richer at the expense of a local politician who would rather nobody knew the money was his. Guest stars include Liam Dunn as Rockefeller, Tol Avery as Stockton, and John Barbour as Jamner.
13	"Dream a Recurring Dream of Me"	December 31, 1972
Sandy is troubled by a recurring dream about a Frenchman who seems to want her to pull his teeth. She sees psychiatrist Dr. Howard (Marge Redmond), who is no help, and then meets the handsome Professor Monet (Cesare Danova), who appears to be her “dream man.” Other guest stars include Marcy Lafferty as the receptionist. Directed by Dan Dailey; written by Arne Sultan and Earl Barret.

== Release ==
Funny Face aired on CBS from September 18 to December 11, 1971, and The Sandy Duncan Show aired on CBS from September 17 to December 31, 1972. Neither show was syndicated. In addition, neither show has been released on DVD or made available on streaming platforms. The Paley Archive at the Beverly Hills Public Library has a copy of the pilot of Funny Face. The UCLA Film & Television Archive in Los Angeles has copies of a few episodes of both shows. Occasionally, episodes can be found on YouTube and other video-sharing platforms. Scripts of some episodes can be found in the Writers Guild Foundation Shavelson-Webb Library in Los Angeles and the television scripts collection of the University of Maryland, Baltimore County, in Baltimore, among other libraries.

== Themes and Analysis ==
Funny Face and The Sandy Duncan Show are significant as examples of a new genre of sitcoms from the late 1960s and early 1970s centered on single career women. In the United States during this era, more middle-class women were entering the work force instead of or in addition to getting married. At the same time, American television networks sought to feature programming that responded to contemporary social trends and that appealed to young, urban viewers. Sitcoms focused on single career women (never married, widowed, or divorced) from this period include Here's Lucy, That Girl, Julia, The Doris Day Show, The Mary Tyler Moore Show, Rhoda, and Alice, as well as less successful shows, such as Shirley's World, Phyllis, Diana, Fay, and Karen. The scholar Katherine J. Lehman argues that "the ubiquity of single working women on television made this character type more acceptable and marketable, and it paved the way for female-headed action and science fiction dramas later in the decade." Like Ann Marie in That Girl, Sandy Stockton is presented in Funny Face and The Sandy Duncan Show as young, virtuous, and content to be single, but marriage material. And like Mary Richards's neighbors and coworkers in The Mary Tyler Moore Show, Sandy's double as family figures and confidantes. However, critics viewed Funny Face and The Sandy Duncan Show as old-fashioned and unimaginative in comparison to The Mary Tyler Moore Show—as did the show's own creators.

Funny Face and The Sandy Duncan Show are also significant as a case study in the vicissitudes of television stardom. In 1970, Sandy Duncan was a young actress poised for television stardom with the full support of CBS. However, during the production of Funny Face, she was caught between the network and the show's creators as they struggled over the show's direction at the same time that she was afflicted with a life-threatening illness that brought production to a halt. Even after she recovered and the show was overhauled, it was unable to build an audience, and the network withdrew its support. Throughout the 1970s, she starred in a series of television specials and guest starred in various television programs, and also pursued a successful career in the theater, but she did not become a regular in another television series until she joined the cast of The Hogan Family in 1987. On the cancellation of her show, she stated: "It was a blessing . … I would not have wanted to live my life that way. Television is a cruel medium. You come. You go. It's a shaky thing to do to people who are already a little unstable. It's why I came back to the theater."
