= Marian Mercer =

American actress (1935–2011)

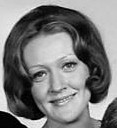
- Born: Marian Ethel Mercer; November 26, 1935; Akron, Ohio, U.S.
- Died: April 27, 2011 (aged 75); Newbury Park, California, U.S.
- Education: University of Michigan
- Occupation: Actress
- Years active: 1955–2000
- Spouse(s): Martin Cassidy (divorced); Patrick Hogan (19??–2011; her death)
- Children: 1

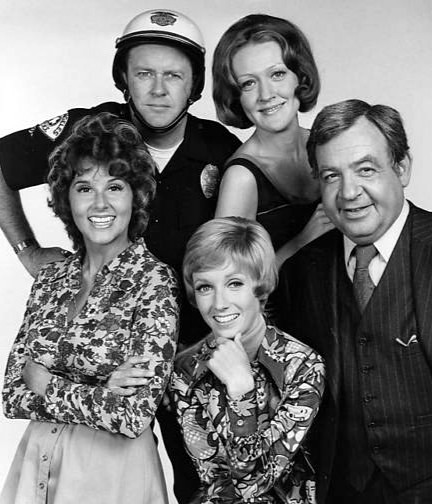
From The Sandy Duncan Show (1972). Front, L-R: Pam Zarit, Sandy Duncan, Tom Bosley. Back: M. Emmet Walsh, Marian Mercer

Marian Ethel Mercer (November 26, 1935 – April 27, 2011) was an American actress and singer.

== Career ==
Born in Akron, Ohio, Mercer was the daughter of Samuel and Nellie Mercer. She graduated from the University of Michigan, then spent several seasons working in summer stock. She made her Broadway debut in the chorus of the short-lived musical, Greenwillow in 1960.

She drew critical notice for her performance in New Faces of 1962, and won the Tony Award for Best Featured Actress in a Musical, the Drama Desk Award for Outstanding Performance, and the Theatre World Award for her performance as Marge MacDougall in Promises, Promises (1968). Additional theatre credits include Hay Fever and the short-lived 1978 revival of Stop the World – I Want to Get Off with Sammy Davis Jr. In 1979, she starred as Deirdre in Bosoms and Neglect.

Mercer was a regular on television, appearing in The Dom DeLuise Show, The Wacky World of Jonathan Winters, The Sandy Duncan Show, A Touch of Grace (starring Shirley Booth), The Andy Williams Show, and the sitcom It's a Living, in which she played piquant restaurant hostess Nancy Beebe Miller. (Mercer was one of four members of the cast who lasted through the series' network and syndicated runs; the others were Gail Edwards, Paul Kreppel, and Barrie Youngfellow). She had recurring roles on Mary Hartman, Mary Hartman; its sequel, Forever Fernwood; St. Elsewhere; and Empty Nest.

She made guest appearances on such shows as Love, American Style; Archie Bunker's Place; Mama's Family; Benson; The Golden Girls; Murder, She Wrote; Touched by an Angel; and Suddenly Susan, among many others. She had featured roles in the television films The Cracker Factory (1979), which starred Natalie Wood, and Murder in Three Acts (1986), starring Peter Ustinov and Tony Curtis. Her big screen credits include John and Mary (1969); Oh, God! Book II (1980); and 9 to 5 (1980), where she played Missy Hart.

Mercer had been reunited with two former co-stars of Mary Hartman, Mary Hartman (in which she played Wanda Rittenhouse Jeeter) in two separate projects. She was reunited first with Dabney Coleman (he had played Merle Jeeter) in the film 9 to 5; and then with Louise Lasser (who played Mary Hartman) on It's a Living.

== Death ==
Mercer was a resident of the Motion Picture & Television Country House and Hospital in Woodland Hills, Los Angeles where she resided until her death on April 27, 2011, from Alzheimer's disease in Newbury Park, California at the age of 75.

== Filmography ==
=== Film ===
Year	Title	Role	Notes
1969	John and Mary	Mags Elliot	
1978	Sammy Stops the World	Evie	
1980	Oh, God! Book II	Harriet Manley	
1980	9 to 5	Missy Hart	
1992	Out on a Limb	Ann Campbell Van Der Haven	

=== Television ===
Year	Title	Role	Notes
1972	The Sandy Duncan Show	Kay Fox	Main role
1973	A Touch of Grace	Myra Bradley	Main role
1974	Love, American Style	Lucy	Segment: "Love and the Itchy Condition"
1974	Police Woman	Jo Enders	Episode: "Fish"
1975	Great Performances	Masha	Episode: "The Seagull"
1975	The Bob Crane Show	Miss Chandler	Episode: "The Lyle Principle"
1976	Serpico	Sister Margaret	Episode: "The Traitor in Our Midst"
1976–77	Mary Hartman, Mary Hartman	Wanda Rittenhouse Jeeter	Supporting role
1977	Forever Fernwood	Wanda Jeeter	Supporting role
1978	King of the Road	Mildred	TV film
1978	The Harvey Korman Show	Grace	Episode: "The One Where Harvey Gets a Job as an Escort"
1979	The Cracker Factory	Eleanor	TV film
1979	Archie Bunker's Place	Miss Bradshaw	Episode: "Bosom Partners"
1980	Phyl & Mikhy	Miss Crandal	Episode: "Mikhy's Visitor"
1980–1989	It's a Living	Nancy Beebe Miller	Regular role (120 episodes)
1981, 1984	Benson	Trudi, Ursula Van Dyne	Episodes: "Rivals", "Made in Hong Kong: Parts 1 & 2"
1982	9 to 5	Frances	Episode: "The Loverwear Party"
1982	Life of the Party: The Story of Beatrice	Rita	TV film
1983	Ace Crawford... Private Eye	Maureen	Episode: "The Gentleman Bandit"
1983	Foot in the Door	Mrs. Griffin	TV series
1983, 1986	St. Elsewhere	Eve Leighton	Recurring role (season 2), guest (season 5)
1984	The Love Boat	Mrs. Rhodes	1 episode
1984	Mama's Family	Felicia	Episode: "Mama for Mayor: Part 2"
1984	Booker	Mrs. Ruffner	TV film
1986	ABC Afterschool Special	Sister Regina	Episode: "Are You My Mother?"
1986	You Again?	Dr. Woods	Episode: "Henry and Matt Get Sick"
1986	Murder in Three Acts	Daisy Eastman	TV film
1989	Oh, Henry!	Mildred	TV film
1990	The Golden Girls	Magda	Episode: "Sisters and Other Strangers"
1991	Sunday Dinner	Martha Benedict	Main role
1991	The Julie Show	June Robbins	TV film
1992	Murder, She Wrote	Penelope Hope Daniels	Episode: "The Witch's Curse"
1992	Harry and the Hendersons	Monica	Episode: "Born Again"
1992–1994	Empty Nest	Ursula Dietz	Episode: "The Unimportance of Being Charley", "My Mother, My Self", "Love a la Mode"
1993	Home Free	Grace Bailey	Main role
1996	Common Law	Bunny	Episode: "In the Matter Of: John's 15 Minutes"
1998	Working	Mrs. Richards	Episode: "The Closer"
1998	Touched by an Angel	Flo	Episode: "Lady of the Lake"
1998	Suddenly Susan	Mrs. Richmond	Episode: "The Thanksgiving Episode"
2000	Providence		Episode: "Paradise Inn"

=== Stage ===
Year	Title	Role	Notes
1960	Greenwillow	Emma (Understudy)/Maidy (Understudy)	Alvin Theatre, Broadway
1961	Little Mary Sunshine	Mary Potts (Replacement)	Orpheum Theatre, Off-Broadway
1962	New Faces of 1962	Bettina/Folk Girl/Happiness Girl/Mother/Mrs. Thurman/Passenger/Woman/Yasmin	Alvin Theatre, Broadway
1964	The Game is Up	Performer	Upstairs at the Downstairs
1966	A Midsummer Night's Dream	Helena	The Repertory Theatre of St. Louis
1966	Twelfth Night	Olivia	The Repertory Theatre of St. Louis
1967	A Streetcar Named Desire	Blanche DuBois	The Repertory Theatre of St. Louis
1967	The Hostage	Miss Gilchrist	The Repertory Theatre of St. Louis
1968	The Student Prince	Grand Duchess	Kenley Players
1968	Your Own Thing	Olivia	Orpheum Theatre, Off-Broadway
1968	Promises, Promises	Marge MacDougall	Shubert Theatre, Broadway
1970	Othello	Desdemona	The Repertory Theatre of St. Louis
1970	Dames at Sea	Joan	The Pocono Playhouse
1970	A Place for Polly	Polly	Ethel Barrymore Theatre, Broadway
1970	Hay Fever	Myra Arundel	Helen Hayes Theater, Broadway
1978	Stop the World - I Want to Get Off	Anya/Evie/Ilse/Lorene	New York State Theatre
1979	I Do! I Do!	She	Pittsburgh CLO
1979	Bosoms and Neglect	Deirdre	Longacre Theatre, Broadway
1993	The Tavern	Mrs. Lamson	Matrix Theatre
1994	Habeas Corpus	Mrs. Swabb	Matrix Theatre
1996	Mad Forest	Irina Vladu/Flavia's Grandmother/Flower Seller	Matrix Theatre
1997	After-Play	Terry	Pasadena Playhouse
1999	The Gin Game	Fonsia Dorsey	La Mirada Theatre for the Performing Arts
