= Pinocchio (1976 TV program) =

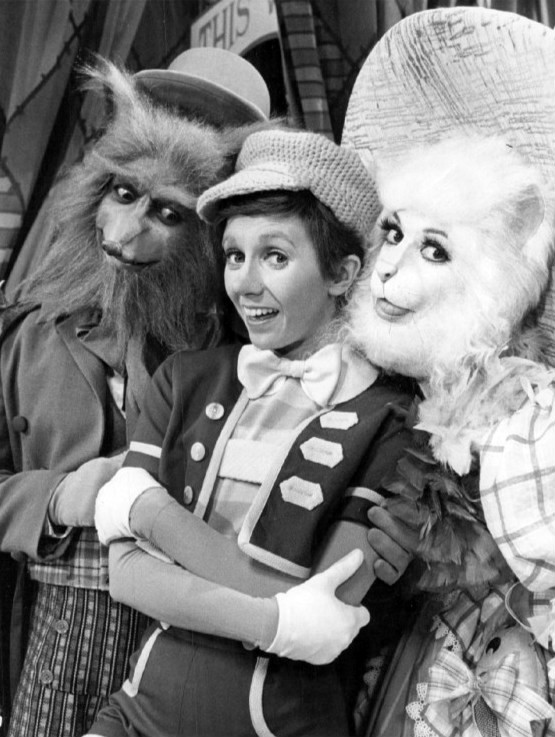
- (L-R) Flip Wilson as Fox, Sandy Duncan as Pinocchio, Liz Torres as Cat
- Based on: The Adventures of Pinocchio by Carlo Collodi
- Directed by: Ron Field; Sid Smith
- Starring: Sandy Duncan; Danny Kaye
- Music by: Billy Barnes
- Country of origin: United States
- Original language: English

Production
- Producers: Bernard Rothman; Jack Wohl
- Editor: Jerry Greene
- Running time: 73 minutes
- Production company: Vidtronics

Original release
- Network: CBS
- Release: March 27, 1976

Pinocchio is a 1976 made-for-TV musical starring Sandy Duncan in the title role and Danny Kaye as Geppetto. It was first broadcast March 27, 1976 on CBS and rerun on April 18, 1977.

== Plot summary ==
Framed by the story of a young theater girl's desire to study and work apart from her father, the classic 1883 children's story The Adventures of Pinocchio is presented as a subplay with the young girl (Sandy Duncan) as Pinocchio and her father (Danny Kaye) as Geppetto.

== Cast ==
- Sandy Duncan ... Pinocchio
- Danny Kaye ... Geppetto
- Clive Revill ... Coachman
- Don Correia ... Candlewick's Mate
- Ben Lokey ... Dancer
- Gary Morgan ... Candlewick
- Roy Smith ... Candlewick's Mate
- Liz Torres ... Cat
- Flip Wilson ... Fox

== Musical numbers ==
1. "Pinocchio" - Ensemble
2. "Talking to Myself" - Geppetto
3. "What's That?" - Pinocchio, Geppetto and ensemble
4. "I Like It" - Pinocchio and ensemble
5. "M-O-R-E" - Fox, Cat and Pinocchio
6. "I'm a No Worried" - Geppetto
7. "The Money Tree" - Fox, Cat, and Pinocchio
8. "Look at Me Now" - Geppetto and ensemble
9. "Fun, Fun, Fun" - Coachman, Pinocchio, and ensemble
10. "If I Could Start Again" - Pinocchio
11. "I Want to Go Home" - Pinocchio and Geppetto
12. "This Little Boy" - Geppetto
13. "Look at `Em Now" - Geppetto, Pinocchio, ensemble
14. "Pinocchio (Reprise)" - Ensemble

== Reception ==
Pinocchio won two Emmy Awards for Outstanding Individual Achievement in Children's Programming, one for Costume Design (Bill Hargate) and another for Videotape Editing. It was also nominated for Emmys for Outstanding Children's Special and Outstanding Makeup (designed by Stan Winston).

== Production notes ==
In 1976, this was the first of two TV musical adaptations of a children's classic starring Danny Kaye and costarring a female as a young boy. On December 12, 1976, NBC telecast Peter Pan with Kaye as Captain Hook and Mia Farrow in the title role.

Ron Field was choreographer.

== Home media ==
Pinocchio was released on DVD on October 24, 2000.
