= Ron Field =

American choreographer (1933–1989)

- Born: October 18, 1933; New York City, U.S.
- Died: February 6, 1989 (aged 55); New York City, U.S.
- Occupations: Choreographer; dancer; director

Ron Field (October 18, 1933 – February 6, 1989) was an American choreographer, dancer, and director.

== Life and career ==
Field was born in New York City, New York where he made his Broadway debut as a child in Lady in the Dark (1941) with Gertrude Lawrence. He later danced in the ensembles of Gentlemen Prefer Blondes (1949), Kismet (1954), and The Boy Friend (1955) before deciding to concentrate on choreography. His first two efforts Nowhere But Up (1962) and Cafe Crown (1964) were unsuccessful, but in 1966 he won his first Tony Award for his work in the hit Cabaret.

During rehearsals for Stephen Sondheim's trouble-plagued Merrily We Roll Along in 1981, Field was dismissed from the creative team.

In addition to his work on Broadway, Field staged such diverse projects as Las Vegas nightclub acts, the 44th Annual Academy Awards telecast in 1972, Pinocchio (a 1976 TV special starring Sandy Duncan), a Hollywood Bowl concert and television special with Bette Midler in 1977, the opening ceremonies for the 1984 Los Angeles Olympics, and an acclaimed revival of Kiss Me, Kate in London's West End. He also choreographed Martin Scorsese's New York, New York (1977).

On February 6, 1989, Field died in New York City at the age of fifty-five. Though obituaries at the time said his "cause of death was brain lesions and neurological impairments," it was common at the time for survivors of public figures to euphemize AIDS or provide only the symptoms and not the overarching cause in obituaries due to rampant stigma. Sources since have confirmed Field did die of AIDS.

== Stage credits ==
- 1987 Cabaret (Choreography)
- 1986 Rags (Choreography)
- 1980 Perfectly Frank (Choreography)
- 1978 King of Hearts (Choreography and Direction)
- 1971 On the Town (Choreography and Direction)
- 1970 Applause (Choreography and Direction)
- 1968 Zorba (Choreography)
- 1966 Cabaret (Choreography)
- 1964 Cafe Crown (Choreography)
- 1962 Nowhere to Go But Up (Choreography)

== Awards and nominations ==
Awards

- 1967 Tony Award for Best Choreography – Cabaret
- 1970 Tony Award for Best Choreography – Applause
- 1970 Tony Award for Best Direction of a Musical – Applause
- 1977 Emmy Award for Outstanding Choreography – America Salutes Richard Rodgers: The Sound of His Music
- 1978 Emmy Award for Outstanding Choreography – The Sentry Collection Presents Ben Vereen: His Roots

Nominations

- 1969 Tony Award for Best Choreography – Zorba
- 1973 Emmy Award for Outstanding Directing in a Comedy, Variety or Music – Once Upon a Mattress
- 1980 Emmy Award for Outstanding Choreography – Baryshnikov on Broadway
- 1987 Tony Award for Best Choreography – Rags
