= The Star-Spangled Girl =

Play written by Neil Simon

The Star-Spangled Girl is a comedy written by Neil Simon. The play is set in San Francisco, California, in the 1960s.

== Plot overview ==
The story is a love triangle, mixed with politics. Roommates and radicals Andy Hobart and Norman Cornell are two earnest young men using their San Francisco apartment as a publishing office for their magazine, Fallout, which is dedicated to fighting "the system" in America, but they barely make a living working on the magazine. Former Olympic swimmer Sophie Rauschmeyer, an all-American Southern girl, moves into the apartment next door. Her friendliness and charm leave Norman hopelessly smitten, but what is love at first sight (or, as the play has it, first smell) for Norman is not reciprocated. Norman's obsession with Sophie causes Andy to hire her just to sustain the magazine's operation. Meanwhile, Andy is fielding telephone calls from the irate printer who wants to collect the money due him, and distracting the landlady from thoughts of back rent with motorcycle rides and surfing expeditions. While she is convinced that they are editing a dangerously subversive magazine, Sophie soon finds that her real source of annoyance is that the wrong man is pressing his attentions on her. Sophie then falls for Andy, though they are at odds politically, threatening to destroy the magazine and the men's friendship.

== History and reception ==
Simon said that he based the play on a "spirited political conversation he overheard between author Paddy Chayefsky and Rene Carpenter, the wife of astronaut Scott Carpenter." While it features Simon's lively comic style—still on display on Broadway in Barefoot in the Park and The Odd Couple when The Star-Spangled Girl debuted—it was not well received.

Rene Carpenter herself later recounted in For Spacious Skies: The Uncommon Journey of a Mercury Astronaut (New York: Harcourt, 2003) a wholly different conversation with Chayefsky. It took place at a New Year's Eve party the Simons' hosted at their home on E. 62nd St. Both Carpenter and Chayefsky were accomplished raconteurs. Rene had just begun publishing her syndicated newspaper column, "A Woman Still." More important, both Rene and Paddy were liberal Democrats. In 1966, the Vietnam war was topic number one. Upon meeting the glamorous Rene, however, Chayefsky made an assumption about Rene's politics. Her reply both charmed Chayefsky and set him back on his heels. Their mock argument commenced, and a crowd gathered to watch.

The impromptu performance had two stock characters: Rene playing, against her nature, a conservative blonde, while Chayefsky played himself. Observing from his vantage as busy host that evening, Simon missed the mischief in their performance and recast the meeting as an opposites-attract encounter, never once realizing that Rene Carpenter had written and performed her own play at his house, a superior one, with Chayefsky contributing. Was Rene Carpenter a "star-spangled girl"? Yes, but she was also a liberal and antiwar "star-spangled girl."

Louis Botto and Robert Viagas called the play "a stultifying evening of vapidity...". Critic Walter Kerr's review in The New York Times determined, "Neil Simon, your friendly neighborhood gagman, hasn't had an idea for a play this season, but he's gone ahead and written one anyway."

In an interview, Simon said that The Star-Spangled Girl "was written 'from an emotional identity rather than personal identity...I knew this one didn't have the body of the others. I knew it never had a chance to be a powerful comedy....I didn't make it'".

== Production ==
The Star-Spangled Girl opened on Broadway at the Plymouth Theatre on December 21, 1966. Prior to Broadway, there were tryout engagements at the Shubert Theatre in New Haven and the Forrest Theatre in Philadelphia. After 261 performances in New York, the play closed on August 5, 1967. The production was directed by playwright George Axelrod. The original cast featured Anthony Perkins as Andy, Richard Benjamin as Norman and Connie Stevens as Sophie. The scenic design was by Oliver Smith, the lighting was by Jean Rosenthal and the costumes were by Ann Roth.

In an interview, Neil Simon was asked whether The Star-Spangled Girl would have been better with direction by Mike Nichols. Simon replied: "Yes. He would have given the actors a different attitude; we would have gone much more for reality than the superficial comedy that came out. That's not to knock George Axelrod....He [Nichols] couldn't do it because he was busy with 'Virginia Woolf' but it isn't true that he advised me not to do it; as a matter of fact he came to Philadelphia, and he liked it. He gave me some advice on it which helped."

== Film ==
The play was adapted into a movie in 1971. Jerry Paris directed and the screenplay was by Arnold Margolin and Jim Parker. The cast starred Tony Roberts as Andy, Todd Susman as Norman and Sandy Duncan as Amy (renamed from Sophie). According to tcm.com, "The film received almost universally poor notices." The New York Times reviewer wrote: "Time and Hollywood have not done wonders for his exuberant but still essentially lightweight comedy....The uninspired adaptation of Simon's antic is a basically contrived affair that may get a share of chuckles but not many hearty laughs."

The movie also features Davy Jones singing "Girl," which he also sang in an episode of the television series The Brady Bunch
