= The Cracker Factory =

- Genre: Drama
- Based on: The Cracker Factory by Joyce Rebeta-Burditt
- Written by: Richard Alan Shapiro (as Richard Shapiro)
- Directed by: Burt Brinckerhoff
- Starring: Natalie Wood
- Music by: Billy Goldenberg
- Country of origin: United States
- Original language: English

Production
- Executive producers: Tony Converse; Roger Gimbel
- Producer: Richard Alan Shapiro (as Richard Shapiro)
- Cinematography: Michel Hugo
- Editor: John A. Martinelli
- Running time: 100 min.
- Production company: EMI Films

Original release
- Network: ABC
- Release: March 16, 1979

The Cracker Factory is an American television film directed by Burt Brinckerhoff. The teleplay by Richard Shapiro is based on the best-selling 1977 novel by Joyce Rebeta-Burditt. The film was broadcast by ABC on March 16, 1979.

== Synopsis ==
Alcoholic Cleveland housewife Cassie Barrett is institutionalized in a psychiatric ward after experiencing a nervous breakdown in the supermarket. We learn this is the latest in a series of hospitalizations from which Cassie emerges supposedly in control of her life but actually still teetering on the edge. During this latest stay, she develops a romantic crush on psychiatrist Edwin Alexander and a close relationship with night supervisor Tinkerbell, both of whom help her take steps toward facing her inner demons and learning to live with sobriety.

== Principal cast ==
- Natalie Wood as Cassie Barrett
- Perry King as Dr. Edwin Alexander
- Shelley Long as Cara
- Juliet Mills as Tinkerbell
- Peter Haskell as Charlie Barrett
- Vivian Blaine as Helen
- Marian Mercer as Eleanor

== Production ==
Wood was signed in December 1978.

== Reception ==
In The New York Times, John J. O'Connor wrote:

The Cracker Factory, adapted by Richard Shapiro from a novel by Joyce Rebeta‐Burdit, involves a “short‐term rehabilitative psychiatric center” in Cleveland. This becomes the home away from home for Cassie Barrett, played with disarming honesty and strength by Natalie Wood...

The Cracker Factory has a perhaps inevitable quota of stock characters and pat perceptions. But it also has offbeat compassion and surprising moments of humor, all held together with solid performances, with Miss Wood providing the crucial dramatic spark.

== See also ==
- List of television films produced for American Broadcasting Company
