= The Flying Scissors =

2009 film

The Flying Scissors is a 2009 mockumentary that follows eight entrants in the a fictional National Rock Paper Scissors League (NRPSL) Championship. The film focuses on the quirky but relateable characters and their desire to balance the nuances of everyday life with the dreams of becoming a champion.

Jonah Tulis directed the film, and co-wrote the script with Blake J. Harris.

== Plot ==
The Flying Scissors is a mockumentary about the world of competitive “Rock, Paper, Scissors.” The film delves into the lives and daily routines of a wide array of quirky characters who vie to be the best at this unorthodox sport. Each competitor must balance the nuances of their everyday life in hopes of becoming a champion.

The film uses Rock Paper Scissors to satire the current state of professional sports and the modern success of poker.

== Cast ==
- Mason Pettit as Phil Stevens
- Devin Ratray as The Rock
- Todd Susman as Frank Johnson
- Matthew Arkin as Alan Pope
- Mike Britt as Leon Washington
- Keong Sim as Bruce Wong
- Jeremy Redleaf as Matty Simms
- Sarah Wheeler as Anna Carlson
- Benim Foster as David Sandberg
- Alex Cranmer as Barry Stine
- Madison Arnold as Mac

== Reception ==
In anticipation of the theatrical release, the film played at over 40 colleges around the United States including UCLA, USC, Duke, Syracuse, North Dakota, and Florida. The film received an extremely positive reaction.

A Variety review states that good execution of a lame idea is better than lame execution of a good idea, and that this low-budget comedy turns out to be a showcase for an attractive cast.
