= Star Spangled Girl =

1971 film by Jerry Paris

- Film poster
- Directed by: Jerry Paris
- Screenplay by: Arnold Margolin; Jim Parker
- Based on: The Star-Spangled Girl by Neil Simon
- Produced by: Howard W. Koch
- Starring: Sandy Duncan; Tony Roberts; Todd Susman; Elizabeth Allen
- Cinematography: Sam Leavitt
- Edited by: Frank Bracht
- Music by: Charles Fox
- Distributed by: Paramount Pictures
- Release date: December 22, 1971
- Running time: 93 minutes
- Country: United States
- Language: English

Star Spangled Girl is a 1971 American romantic comedy film directed by Jerry Paris and based on the 1966 Neil Simon play The Star-Spangled Girl. It stars Sandy Duncan, Tony Roberts, Todd Susman, and Elizabeth Allen.

== Plot ==
In a Los Angeles neighborhood, Andy Hobart does everything he can to keep his struggling, two-man, radical underground newspaper, the Nitty Gritty, going; he steals food from the supermarket and other people's laundry from the dry cleaners, and holds off their creditors, especially their landlady, Mrs. MacKaninee, and their printer, Mr. Karlson. To appease Mrs. MacKaninee, he accompanies her motorcycling, waterskiing, and surfing. He lives with talented, but nerdy Norman Cornell, who writes the entire newspaper.

One day, a perky, talkative Southern girl moves into the bungalow across from them. Amy Cooper has come to the big city to train for the Olympics with the best swimming coach in the country. Norman falls instantly in love with her (or rather with the way she smells) and neglects his writing, causing Andy untold headaches.

Norman drives Amy to distraction with his misguided, over-the-top attempts to win her affection. When he unintentionally gets her fired from her day job, Andy hires her as a secretary, just to keep Norman happy (and writing). Then something unexpected happens. Despite despising everything Andy stands for, the conservative Amy discovers (to her great disgust) that she is physically attracted to him and likes the way he smells, which is rather awkward, since she is scheduled to marry another swimmer in a few weeks. When she informs Andy, he is uncertain how to react. She gets him to kiss her to see how it feels, at which point Norman walks in.

Amy decides to go back to Florida because Andy is not interested in her. Norman quits over what he considers a betrayal, but quickly changes his mind and goes back to work, cured of Amy. Meanwhile, Andy discovers to his horror that the smell of Amy permeates the room even after she is gone. He chases after her and gets her to come back.

== Cast ==
- Sandy Duncan as Amy Cooper
- Tony Roberts as Andy Hobart
- Todd Susman as Norman Cornell
- Elizabeth Allen as Mrs. MacKaninee
- Artie Lewis as Mr. Karlson
- Allen Jung as Laundryman
- Helen Kleeb as YWCA Receptionist
- Harry Northup as Cowboy on Bus
- Gordon Bosserman as Karlson's Boy
- Jim Conners as Karlson's Boy
- Peter Hobbs as Man in Car

== Cast notes ==
Britt Ekland, Ali MacGraw, Cybill Shepherd and Goldie Hawn were offered the leading role, but turned it down. Marlo Thomas was considered for the lead, as was Joey Heatherton. Sandy Duncan hired a professional trainer to help improve her swimming while auditioning for the part of Amy.

== Production ==
Elizabeth Allen shot her scenes in 5 days.

The theme song of the film is "Girl", sung by Davy Jones of The Monkees. A different single version of the song was heard on the TV show The Brady Bunch; that episode, "Getting Davy Jones", was originally broadcast December 10, 1971, shortly before the film's release. The opening lyrics are changed for the movie version: "Girl, look what you've done to me, me and my whole world" (single version) becomes "Girl, you have a way with you, you could change my world" (movie version). Jones sang a '90's "Grunge" version of the song during a cameo appearance in The Brady Bunch Movie.

Star Spangled Girl was a box-office flop.

== Reception ==
The New York Times reviewer A. H. Weler wrote, "Time and Hollywood have not done wonders for his exuberant but still essentially lightweight comedy....The uninspired adaptation of Simon's antic is a basically contrived affair that may get a share of chuckles but not many hearty laughs."

Roger Ebert of the Chicago Sun-Times gave it three stars out of four, stating, "It pays the slightest possible attention to the story line, and revels in breakneck dialog, and somewhere along the way you begin to like the artificiality of it all."

== See also ==
- List of American films of 1971
