= The Cat from Outer Space =

1978 film by Norman Tokar

- Theatrical release poster
- Directed by: Norman Tokar
- Written by: Ted Key
- Produced by: Ron Miller
- Starring: Ken Berry; Sandy Duncan; Harry Morgan; Ronnie Schell; Roddy McDowall; McLean Stevenson
- Cinematography: Charles F. Wheeler
- Edited by: Cotton Warburton
- Music by: Lalo Schifrin
- Production company: Walt Disney Productions
- Distributed by: Buena Vista Distribution
- Release date: June 30, 1978 (New York)
- Running time: 104 minutes
- Country: United States
- Language: English
- Budget: $3.5 to 4 million

The Cat from Outer Space is a 1978 American science fiction comedy film directed by Norman Tokar (his final film before his death the following year) starring Ken Berry, Sandy Duncan, Harry Morgan, Ronnie Schell, Roddy McDowall and McLean Stevenson.

Produced by Walt Disney Productions, it was shot at the studio's Golden Oak Ranch and Santa Clarita, California. It paired Harry Morgan with McLean Stevenson whom Morgan had replaced on M*A*S*H three years prior.

== Plot ==
A UFO makes an emergency landing on Earth and is taken into custody by the United States government. The occupant of the "flying saucer" turns out to be a strange cat-like alien named Zunar-J-5/9 Doric-4-7. Since the Mother Ship cannot send a rescue party before it leaves the Solar System, the cat sets about investigating how to repair the ship himself. Using a special collar that amplifies telekinetic and telepathic abilities, he follows the military to the Energy Research Laboratory (or E.R.L.), where they hope to learn how the UFO's power source works. One of the lab's scientists, Frank Wilson, attracts the cat's attention when his theory on the power source, while ridiculed by the rest of the staff, is actually on the right track.

The cat follows Frank to his office, where Frank nicknames him Jake. Another scientist, Liz Bartlet, storms into his office, upset at Frank's sense of humor in light of such an important scientific discovery. Frank is able to calm her down, mostly by introducing Jake and inviting her to dinner. After Liz leaves, Jake reveals his true nature to Frank, demonstrating his abilities and offering to exchange his advanced knowledge of energy for Frank's assistance. That evening, the pair plan to break into the military base where Jake's ship is being kept, but must dodge Liz who has arrived for their date with her own cat, Lucybelle. Jake feigns being sick, allowing them to proceed to the base. At the base, Frank uses a back-up collar to fly to the top of the ship and attach a diagnostic device. Jake learns that he needs an element that he calls "Org 12". When Jake reveals the element's atomic weight, Frank realizes that "Org 12" is elemental gold.

Back at Frank's apartment, Frank tells Jake that a quantity of gold costing $120,000 will repair Jake's ship. Norman Link, a colleague of Frank's, comes over to watch horse races and football games on which he has wagered money. Jake uses his powers to help Link's horse win the race, prompting Jake and Frank to convince Link to help them by parlaying all of his bets to win the money. However, Jake gets knocked out by a well-meaning vet that was brought in by Liz because she thought Jake was still sick. Frank informs Liz of the situation and the group heads to a local pool hall where Link has placed his bets. Learning the last game in the parlay was lost and desperate to raise the money needed, they agree to a game of pool with a hustler named Sarasota Slim. Frank's first attempt to use Jake's collar fails, but Jake regains consciousness in time to manipulate the final game and win the money they need to acquire the gold for Jake's ship.

However, an industrial spy named Stallwood, who works for a master criminal named Olympus, has learned of their activities, as has the military. Frank and Jake manage to elude the military and the criminals, only to have Link, Liz and Lucybelle captured by Olympus and his men. They plan to ransom them back for the collar, which forces Jake to send his ship back to the awaiting Mother Ship and stay on Earth in order to help rescue his friends. Jake and Frank use a broken-down biplane to rescue Liz and Lucybelle from Olympus's helicopter, which crashes; Olympus, Stallwood and their men survive and are presumably arrested. In the final scene, Jake is allowed to stay on Earth as a representative of an off-world "friendly power", with Jake applying for and being granted United States citizenship.

== Cast ==
- Ken Berry as Frank Wilson
- Sandy Duncan as Liz Bartlett
- Harry Morgan as Gen. Stilton
- Rumpler and Amber (brother and sister Abyssinian cats) as Jake / Zunar-J-5/9 Doric-4-7
  - Ronnie Schell also as Jake's voice
- Ronnie Schell as Sgt. Duffy
- Roddy McDowall as Mr. Stallwood
- McLean Stevenson as Norman Link
- Jesse White as Earnest Ernie (the gambling dealer)
- Alan Young as Dr. Winger (veterinarian)
- Hans Conried as Chief Dr. Heffel
- James Hampton as Capt. Anderson
- Howard Platt as Col. Woodruff
- William Prince as Charlie Olympus
- Ralph Manza as Weasel
- Tom Pedi as Honest Harry
- Hank Jones as officer
- Rick Hurst as Dydee guard
- Sorrell Booke as judge
- Fred Whalen as Sarasota Slim (pool hustler)
- John Alderson as Mr. Smith
- Tiger Joe Marsh as Omar
- Alfred Soboloff as NASA executive
- Mel Carter as 1st soldier
- Dallas McKennon as Charlie Cooney
- Alice Backes as farmer's wife
- Henry Slate as sandwich man
- Roger Pancake as Red
- Roger Price as 1st E.R.L. report
- Jerry Fujikawa as 2nd E.R.L. report
- Jim Begg as Dydee driver
- Peter Renaday as Baliff
- Rickie Sorensen as technician
- Tom Jackman as Army engineer
- Joseph G. Medalis as sucker
- Gil Stratton as 1st NASA scientist
- Jana Milo as 2nd NASA scientist

== Reception ==
Tom Buckley of The New York Times wrote, "The complications begin amusingly enough, but tend to become tiresome and predictable well before the movie is over. Even so, The Cat From Outer Space is likely to keep the under-14's amused, at least if supplemented by plenty of popcorn." Variety wrote, "The fun, as usual with Disney pix, comes in the believable sight gags provided along the way. Also as usual, it's a good cast of veterans and nothing to tax them beyond their abilities, all ably kept in place by director Norman Tokar. The aerial climax is especially good." Linda Gross of the Los Angeles Times described the film as "successful G-rated family fare" but "at one hour, 43 minutes is too long, particularly the jeopardy situation involving the midair transfer of Duncan and her cat from a pilotless helicopter to another plane." Judith Martin of The Washington Post wrote, "This is not exactly inspiring material, but it is harmless enough — unless the child expects you to sit through it with him." Martyn Auty of The Monthly Film Bulletin stated, "Putatively aimed at the junior end of the s-f market, this 'Close Encounter of the 'Furred' Kind' is a distinctly earthbound Disney adventure film, in which magical technology is harnessed to foiling villains and rescuing heroines, human and feline. For all that, The Cat from Outer Space displays its visual trickery ingeniously and more or less reverently within the caper-comedy narrative."

The film holds a score of 67% on Rotten Tomatoes based on 9 reviews, with an average rating of 5.2 out of 10.

== See also ==
- List of American films of 1978
