= Don Correia =

American actor, choreographer (born 1951)

- Born: Donald Correia; August 28, 1951 (age 74); San Jose, California, US
- Occupations: Dancer; actor; choreographer; singer
- Years active: Theater and stage (1975–present); Film and television (1976–present)
- Spouse: Sandy Duncan (m. 1980)
- Children: 2

Donald Correia (born August 28, 1951) is an American dancer, singer, actor and choreographer of stage, film and television. He was nominated in 1986 for the Tony Award for Best Actor in a Musical for Singin' in the Rain. He is married to actress Sandy Duncan.

== Biography ==
Correia was born in San Jose, California on August 8, 1951. Correia has worked in theater, film and television as an actor, dancer, singer and choreographer since 1976. In 1983, he played Vernon Castle on TV Parade of Stars, teaming with his wife Sandy Duncan who played Irene Castle. He served as the choreographer for the 1988 film My Stepmother Is an Alien, starring Kim Basinger. Correia appeared in a cameo role in the reception scene in the Woody Allen film Everyone Says I Love You.

On Broadway, he starred in several musicals, including the 1986 stage version of Singin' In The Rain playing the part of Don Lockwood, for which he was nominated for the Tony Award for Best Actor in a Musical.

== Personal life ==
Correia has been married to actress and producer Sandy Duncan since July 21, 1980, They have two sons: Jeffrey (b. October 5, 1982) and Michael (b. March 19, 1984). Both Jeffrey and Michael appeared with their mother in a Wheat Thins commercial campaign of the late 1980s.

Correia and Duncan reside in Connecticut.

== Broadway Productions ==
- A Chorus Line (Broadway, July 25, 1975)
- Perfectly Frank (Broadway, November 30, 1980)
- Sophisticated Ladies (Broadway, March 1, 1981)
- Little Me (Broadway, January 21, 1982)
- My One And Only (Broadway, May 1, 1983)
- Singin 'in the Rain (Broadway, July 2, 1985) (Tony Nomination, Best Actor in a Musical)
- Follies (Broadway, April 5, 2001)
- Follies (Broadway, September 12, 2011)

== Filmography ==
- Pinocchio (1976)
- Once Upon a Brothers Grimm (1976)
- Television Parade of Stars (1983)
- Everyone Says I Love You (1996, cameo appearance)
