= Todd Susman =

American actor

- Born: January 17, 1947 (age 79); St. Louis, Missouri, U.S.
- Occupation: Actor
- Years active: 1970–present
- Spouses: Judy Susman (divorced); Bella Kardonov (m. 1982)
- Children: 4

Todd Susman (born January 17, 1947) is an American actor.

== Early life ==
A native of St. Louis, Missouri, Susman graduated from Ladue Horton Watkins High School in 1965.

== Career ==
Susman has appeared in over one hundred different television series and commercials and was also featured in the Broadway production of Hairspray, the 1970s films Star Spangled Girl (1971), The Loners (1972), Little Cigars (1973) and California Dreaming (1979). He later appeared in the major studio films Beverly Hills Cop II (1987), Coneheads (1993), The Juror (1996), and the remake of The Taking of Pelham 123 (2009). Susman was in the 2007 independent film, The Big Bad Swim, and the 2009 comedy, The Flying Scissors. He also voiced the lead character in the 2002 video game Soldier of Fortune II: Double Helix.

Susman had supporting roles in the films Only The Strong (1993), Night of the Running Man (1995), Bodily Harm (1995), Just Write (1997), Blast from the Past (1999), High Roller: The Stu Ungar Story (2003), The A Plate (2011) and The Discoverers (2012).

In addition, he appeared in the TV Movies Death Scream (1975), Portrait of an Escort (1980), Thornwell (1981), The Other Victim (1981), City Killer (1984), I Married a Centerfold (1984), The Guardian (1997), The Superagent (2009) and You Don't Know Jack (2010). He portrayed Sergeant Dobbs in the 1986 TV mini-series Fresno.

Susman's better known television roles include, between 1984 and 1989, as Officer Shifflett on 20 episodes of Newhart, and as the unseen P.A. system announcer on 46 episodes of the television series M*A*S*H (a task he shared with actor Sal Viscuso, who provided the voice on 37 episodes), and one guest role in January 1974, as Private Danny Baker. Susman played Howard Bloom in 5 episodes of Orange is the New Black. He portrayed Ben Braxton in 6 episodes of Empty Nest, Victor Bevine in 4 episodes of St. Elsewhere, Glen in 4 episodes of Grace Under Fire, Bill in 4 episodes of Coach, and 4 different characters in 4 episodes of Barney Miller.

In 1976, he was a regular on the six-episode CBS adventure series Spencer's Pilots. He portrayed Ted Lapinsky in The Waltons (the episodes 'The Home Front' (1979) and 'The Unthinkable" (1980)) and appeared as detective Spade Marlow in the 1991 episode of The Golden Girls titled "The Case of the Libertine Belle". Before that, Susman submitted a pilot series for Grant Tinker for MTM Enterprises about an innocent young man arriving in New York City to start his career. Other television shows Susman has appeared on since 1971 include Love, American Style (3 episodes), Room 222 (3 episodes), Kojak, Eight Is Enough, The White Shadow, Little House on the Prairie, Lou Grant, Remington Steele, Alice, Hill Street Blues, The Facts of Life, Cagney & Lacey, Night Court (3 episodes), Who's the Boss?, Punky Brewster (3 episodes), Webster (4 episodes), ALF, Highway to Heaven, Murder, She Wrote, Blossom (2 episodes), Married... with Children, The Commish, ER, Suddenly Susan, Law & Order, Law & Order: Special Victims Unit, and Bull.

In 2012, Susman appeared in the original cast of the off-Broadway Westside Theatre show, "Old Jews Telling Jokes", in which Jessica Shaw of Entertainment Weekly called his portrayal "the funniest moment...delivered with a Yiddish accent as thick as schmaltz". Jason Zinoman of The New York Times also complimented his performance, saying "the incongruity between content and form is perfectly tuned, and Mr. Susman benefits from resisting the urge to oversell the joke". David Finkle of TheaterMania.com also said Susman "often scores simply through his feigned stoicism".

In 2013, Susman, along with the Old Jews Telling Jokes cast and The Chew personality Carla Hall, appeared at Carnegie Deli to unveil the "OJTJ sandwich", named for the comedy group.

== Personal life ==
In a 1971 news article, Susman mentioned he moved to Los Angeles because a friend told him he could make $500 a week as a writer. Unfortunately, the plan did not go well and he ended up making $60 a week as a writer for American International Pictures. (Susman would play the lead role in a sitcom pilot about a man in a similar situation: an Ohio novelist who comes to New York expecting his book to be published, but it isn't, and he has to scrape by doing odd jobs. The pilot, "Going Places", aired on NBC on March 19, 1973, but it wasn't picked up by the network.)

Susman has one child with his first wife Judy, who is a working actress. He married Bella Kordonov on November 6, 1982; they have three children.

== Filmography ==
=== Film ===
| Year | Title | Role | Notes |
|---|---|---|---|
| 2022 | Pinball: The Man Who Saved the Game | Sam Gensberg | |
| 2012 | The Discoverers | Dr. Salter | |
| 2011 | The A Plate | Lieutenant Stan Carlson | |
| 2010 | You Don't Know Jack | Stan Levy | TV movie |
| 2009 | The Flying Scissors | Frank Johnson | |
| 2009 | The Superagent | Solar | TV movie |
| 2009 | The Taking of Pelham 123 | Supervisor | |
| 2006 | The Big Bad Swim | Martin Webber | |
| 2003 | High Roller: The Stu Ungar Story | Max Ungar | |
| 1999 | Blast from the Past | Butcher | |
| 1997 | The Guardian | Mickey Cashulin | TV movie |
| 1997 | Just Write | Priest | |
| 1996 | The Juror | Bozeman | |
| 1995 | Bodily Harm | Jerry Roth | |
| 1995 | Night of the Running Man | Meyer Weiss | |
| 1993 | Coneheads | Ron | |
| 1993 | Only the Strong | Mr. Cochran | |
| 1987 | Beverly Hills Cop II | Foreman | |
| 1984 | I Married a Centerfold | Bill Bodell | TV movie |
| 1984 | The City Killer | Jerry | TV movie |
| 1981 | The Other Victim | Tim McQuire | TV movie |
| 1981 | Thornwell | Ketchum | TV movie |
| 1980 | Portrait of an Escort | Ted Quinn | TV movie |
| 1979 | California Dreaming | Jordy Banks | |
| 1975 | Death Scream | Jimmy Crescent | TV movie |
| 1973 | Little Cigars | "Buzz" | |
| 1972 | The Loners | Alan | |
| 1971 | Star Spangled Girl | Norman Cornell | |

=== Television ===
| Year | Title | Role | Notes |
|---|---|---|---|
| 2020–2021 | For Life | Judge Ira Walker | 2 episodes |
| 2018–2021 | Bull | Judge Mathias Cleary | 3 episodes |
| 2014 | Alpha House | Saul Watt | 4 episodes |
| 2013–2014 | Orange Is the New Black | Howard Bloom | 5 episodes |
| 2012 | Person of Interest | Henry Brooks | Episode: "'Til Death" |
| 2000 | Angel | Magnus Bryce | Episode: "Guise Will Be Guise" |
| 2000 | Futurama | P.A. Announcer (voice) | Episode: "War Is the H-Word" |
| 1999 | ER | Dr. Sam Jenkins | Episode: "Greene with Envy" |
| 1997 | The Burning Zone | Henry Newland | 2 episodes |
| 1995–1997 | Coach | Bill | 4 episodes |
| 1995–1996 | Grace Under Fire | Glen | 4 episodes |
| 1995 | Step by Step | Howard | Episode: "Midnight Caller" |
| 1995 | The Invaders | Captain Johnson | 2 episodes |
| 1994–1995 | Empty Nest | Ben Braxton | 6 episodes |
| 1994 | The Commish | Gideon 'Giggy' Fisher | Episode: "Romeo and Juliet" |
| 1994 | Lois & Clark: The New Adventures of Superman | Eugene Laderman | Episode: "The Ides of Metropolis" |
| 1994 | Married... with Children | Bill Ellis | Episode: "Get Outta Dodge" |
| 1991 | The Golden Girls | Detective Spade Marlow | Episode: "The Case of the Libertine Belle" |
| 1991 | Sons and Daughters | Roger | 2 episodes |
| 1990 | City | Roger Barnett | 13 episodes |
| 1989 | Have Faith | Arthur Glass | 7 episodes |
| 1989 | Highway to Heaven | Mr. Carlyle | Episode: "Goodbye, Mr. Zelinka" |
| 1989 | ALF | Jimbo | Episode: "Hide Away" |
| 1987 | Punky Brewster | Mike Deaton | Episode: "Beer & Buffalos Don't Mix" |
| 1987 | Who's the Boss? | Marty Di Nardo | Episode: "A Fishy Tale" |
| 1986 | Fresno | Sergeant Dobbs | 4 episodes |
| 1986 | Night Court | Mr. Rodgers | Episode: "Dan's Operation, Part 1 & 2" |
| 1985–1988 | St. Elsewhere | Victor Bevine | 4 episodes |
| 1985 | Fame | Jim Parker | Episode: "Leroy and the Kid" |
| 1985 | St. Elsewhere | Dr. Westphall's Insightful Moving Man | Episode: "Slice O'Life" |
| 1984–1989 | Newhart | Officer Shifflett | 20 episodes |
| 1983–1984 | Goodnight, Beantown | Augie Kleindab | 2 episodes |
| 1982 | Star of the Family | Leo Feldman | 10 episodes |
| 1981 | Little House on the Prairie | Max | Episode: "The Legend of Black Jake" |
| 1979–1980 | The Waltons | Ted Lapinsky | 3 episodes |
| 1978 | Eight is Enough | Artie | Episode: "The War Between the Bradfords" |
| 1976 | Spencer's Pilots | Stan Lewis | 11 episodes |
| 1975 | The Bob Crane Show | Marvin Susman | 14 episodes |
| 1974 | M*A*S*H | Pvt. Danny Baker | Episode: "Operation Noselift" |
| 1973–1979 | M*A*S*H | P.A. System Announcer | 47 episodes |
| 1971, 1973 | Room 222 | Barney, Archie, Arthur Billings | 3 episodes |

=== Video games ===
| Year | Title | Role |
|---|---|---|
| 2026 | Grand Theft Auto VI | The Local Population |
| 2010 | Red Dead Redemption | The Local Population |
| 2005 | Bully | Mr. Gordon |
| 2003 | Max Payne 2: The Fall of Max Payne | Mobster / Policeman / Russian |
| 2002 | Soldier of Fortune II: Double Helix | John Mullins |
| 2001 | Fallout Tactics: Brotherhood of Steel | Paladin Ziskele |
| 2000 | Soldier of Fortune | John Mullins |
| 1997 | Dilbert's Desktop Games | Pointy-Haired Boss / Fool Voices |
