= Sandy Duncan =

American actress, dancer, and singer

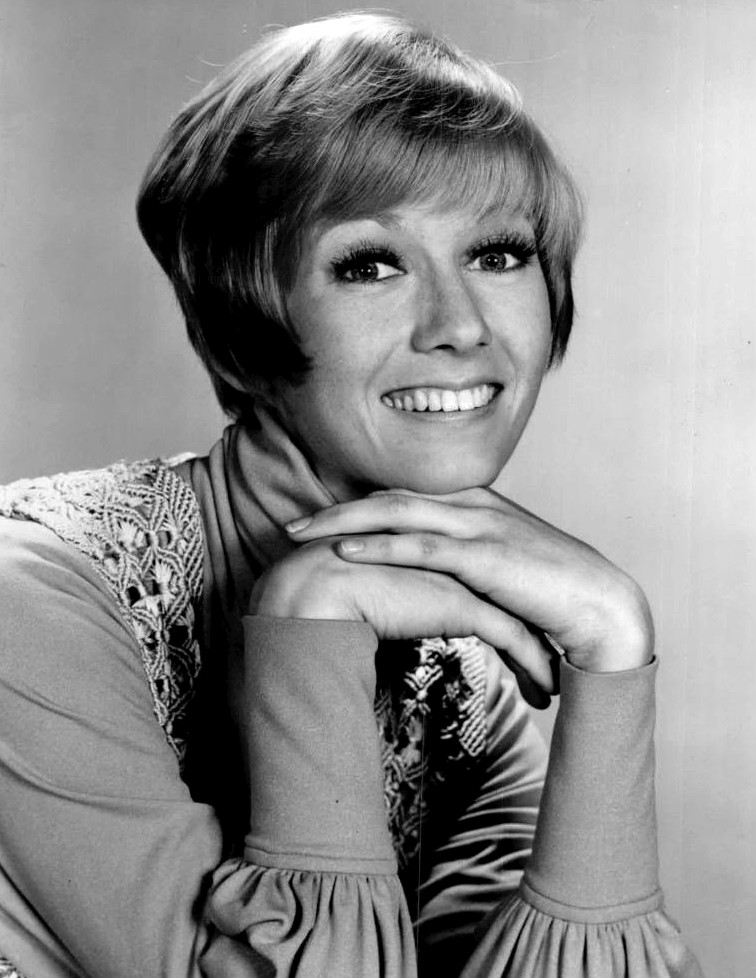
- Duncan in 1972
- Born: Sandra Kay Duncan; February 20, 1946 (age 80); New London, Texas, U.S.
- Occupations: Actress; comedian; dancer; singer
- Years active: 1958–present
- Known for: The Hogan Family; Peter Pan; The Cat from Outer Space; The Million Dollar Duck; The Fox and the Hound
- Spouses: Bruce Scott (m. 1968; div. 1972) Dr. Thomas Calcaterra (m. 1973; div. 1979) Don Correia (m. 1980)
- Children: 2

Sandra Kay Duncan (born February 20, 1946) is an American actress, comedian, dancer and singer. She is known for her performances in the Broadway revival of Peter Pan, the sitcom The Hogan Family, and the Disney films The Million Dollar Duck, The Cat from Outer Space, and The Fox and the Hound. Duncan has been nominated for three Tony Awards, two Emmy Awards and two Golden Globe Awards.

== Early life ==
Duncan was born in New London, Texas, to Sylvia and Mancil Ray Duncan, a gas-station owner. She spent her early years there before moving to Tyler, Texas, when she was in third grade. She performed in her first dance recital at the age of five.

== Career ==
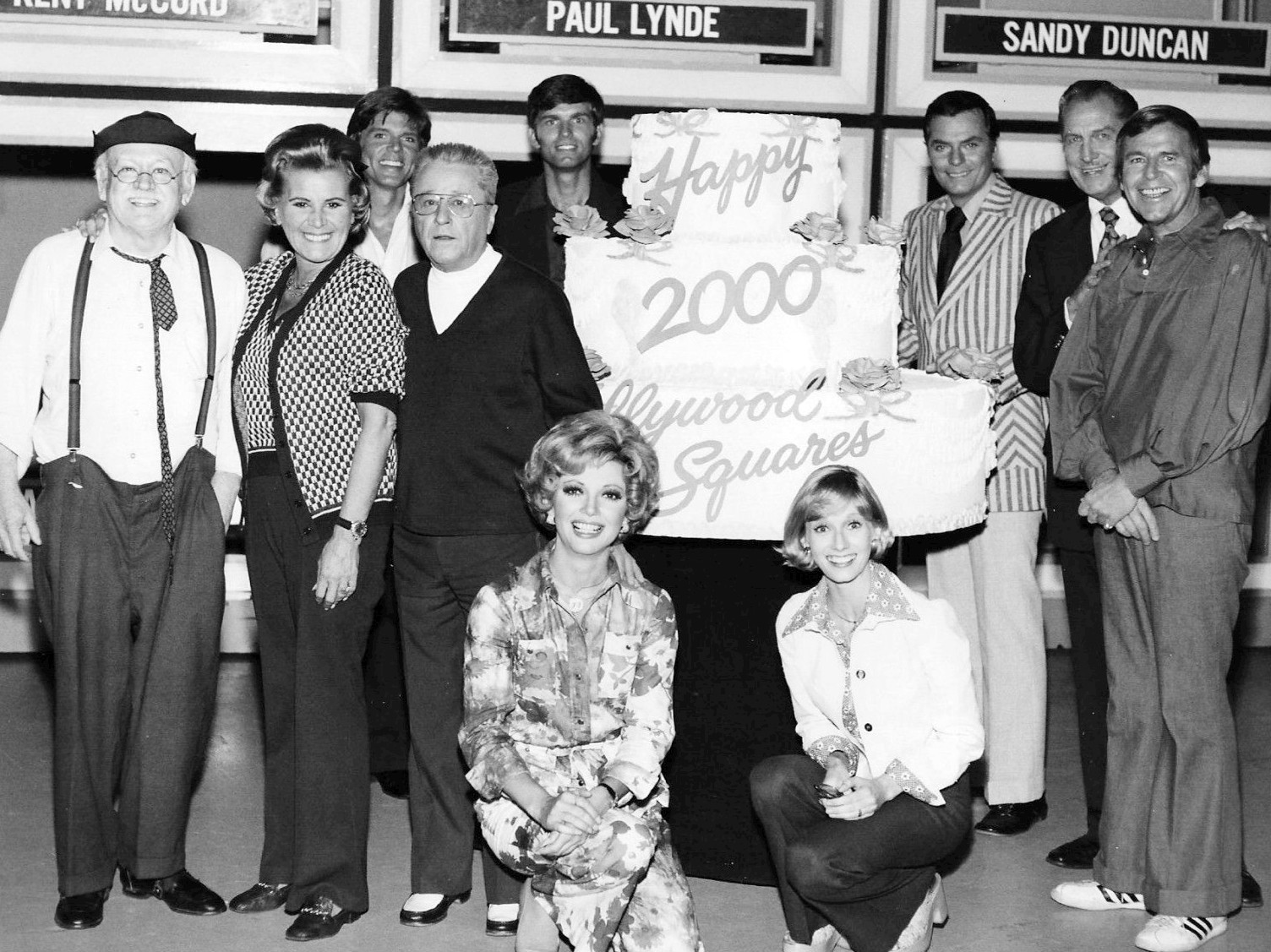
Photo from the television game show Hollywood Squares to celebrate the 2,000th episode in 1974. Pictured are Cliff Arquette as Charley Weaver, Rose Marie, John Davidson, George Gobel, Kent McCord, Peter Marshall, Vincent Price, Paul Lynde; Ruta Lee and Duncan, foreground.

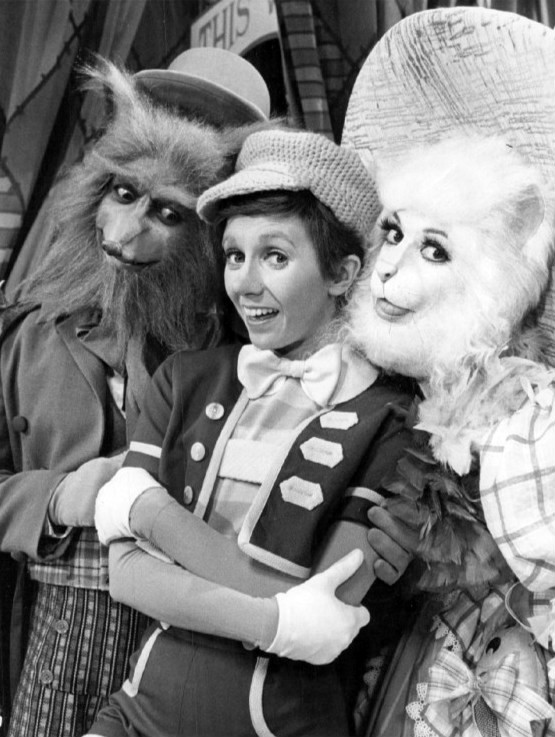
Duncan as Pinocchio with Flip Wilson as Fox and Liz Torres as Cat (TV musical, 1976)

Duncan started her entertainment career at age 12, working in a local production of The King and I for $150 a week. In 1965, she moved to New York into the famed Rehearsal Club for aspiring actresses. In the late 1960s, she appeared in a commercial for United California Bank and in the soap opera Search for Tomorrow briefly in 1968.

In 1970, Time named Duncan one of the "most promising faces of tomorrow". That same year, she starred in the Broadway revival of The Boy Friend, for which she received favorable reviews. Duncan made her feature-film debut co-starring with Dean Jones in the Walt Disney family comedy The Million Dollar Duck. She was then cast as Amy Cooper in the Paramount film version of Star Spangled Girl, based on the Broadway play by Neil Simon. Both films performed poorly at the box office. In autumn 1971, Duncan starred as Sandy Stockton on the CBS sitcom Funny Face. The program was placed in the Saturday-night prime-time schedule between All in the Family and The New Dick Van Dyke Show.

Shortly after the premiere of Funny Face, Duncan underwent surgery to remove a benign brain tumor behind her left optic nerve. She lost vision in her left eye, but because it still tracked with her right eye, Duncan and her doctors elected to leave it in place. Duncan does not have a glass eye as rumored. Her recovery from the operation was rapid, but CBS suspended production on Funny Face until the following year after the 12th installment had been filmed; the original series pilot served as the 13th (and final) episode. At first, Nielsen ratings for Funny Face were low, ranking in the lower 50s, but they eventually climbed to #17, and the show was called the best-liked new show of that television season.

Duncan was nominated for an Emmy Award for Outstanding Continued Performance by an Actress in a Leading Role in a Comedy Series. In September 1972, Funny Face returned as The Sandy Duncan Show, with a revised format, new writers and a new time slot, Sundays at 8:30 p.m. Critical reaction to the show was similar to that for Funny Face, but without the strong Saturday night lead-in of All in the Family, the ratings sank. After 13 episodes, CBS canceled the series. In 1976, Duncan played the title role in a television musical adaptation of Pinocchio that featured Danny Kaye as Geppetto and Flip Wilson as the Fox. She also guest-starred in a first-season episode of The Muppet Show. For her performance as Missy Anne Reynolds in the miniseries Roots, she earned another Emmy nomination.

Duncan then returned to the Broadway stage for many years. In 1979, her run as the title role in Peter Pan won her many accolades. She also had replacement roles in My One and Only and Chicago. She was nominated for a Tony Award three times: in 1969, for Featured Actress (Musical) for Canterbury Tales, in 1971, as Best Actress (Musical) for The Boy Friend and in 1980, as Best Actress (Musical) for Peter Pan.

In 1972, an animated version of Duncan (who contributed her own voice) appeared in the "Sandy Duncan's Jekyll and Hyde" episode of the CBS Saturday-morning cartoon The New Scooby-Doo Movies; forty-eight years later, she reprised her guest star appearance in "The Dreaded Remake of Jekyll & Hyde!" episode of Scooby-Doo and Guess Who?. In 1976, she guest-starred on The Six Million Dollar Man and The Bionic Woman playing the role of Gillian in "The Return of Bigfoot" episodes. In 1978, Duncan starred in Disney's The Cat from Outer Space. From the mid-1970s through the 1980s, Duncan was the commercial spokesperson for Nabisco's Wheat Thins crackers.

In 1981, Duncan voiced Vixey in The Fox and the Hound. In 1984, she starred in a song and dance revue titled 5-6-7-8...Dance! at Radio City Music Hall and provided voice work for the My Little Pony television special Rescue at Midnight Castle as Firefly and Applejack. From 1986 to 1987, she reprised her role as Firefly in the My Little Pony 'n Friends series. In 1987, she joined the cast of NBC's Valerie's Family (previously known as Valerie, later to be retitled The Hogan Family) after Valerie Harper was dismissed. Duncan starred as the matriarch's sister-in-law Sandy Hogan, who moves in with her brother Mike (Josh Taylor) and his three sons to help raise the family after Valerie Hogan's death. She remained with the series through its cancellation in 1991.

In 1988, she worked on the first three Barney and the Backyard Gang children's videos. Duncan was asked to take part in the Barney & Friends television series, but declined the offer. In 1991, she voiced Peepers the mouse in the Don Bluth film Rock-a-Doodle. In 1994, she voiced Queen Uberta in the Richard Rich film The Swan Princess. From 1999-2001, she co-hosted, with Ron Montez, the PBS show Championship Ballroom Dancing.

In 2003, Duncan appeared in the rotating cast of the Off-Broadway staged reading of Wit & Wisdom. In May 2008, she performed one of the lead roles in the musical No, No, Nanette, a production of the City Center's annual Encores! series. In April 2009, she performed the lead role in the play Driving Miss Daisy at Casa Mañana Theatre in Fort Worth, Texas. In September 2009, she played Amanda in Tennessee Williams' play The Glass Menagerie at the Mountain Playhouse in Jennerstown, Pennsylvania. She participated in many traveling stage productions, including The King and I.

On February 12, 2016, Duncan took the role of Madame du Maurier in the Broadway production of Finding Neverland. On February 17, the show's producers announced that she would take a temporary leave of absence because of family obligations.

== Personal life ==
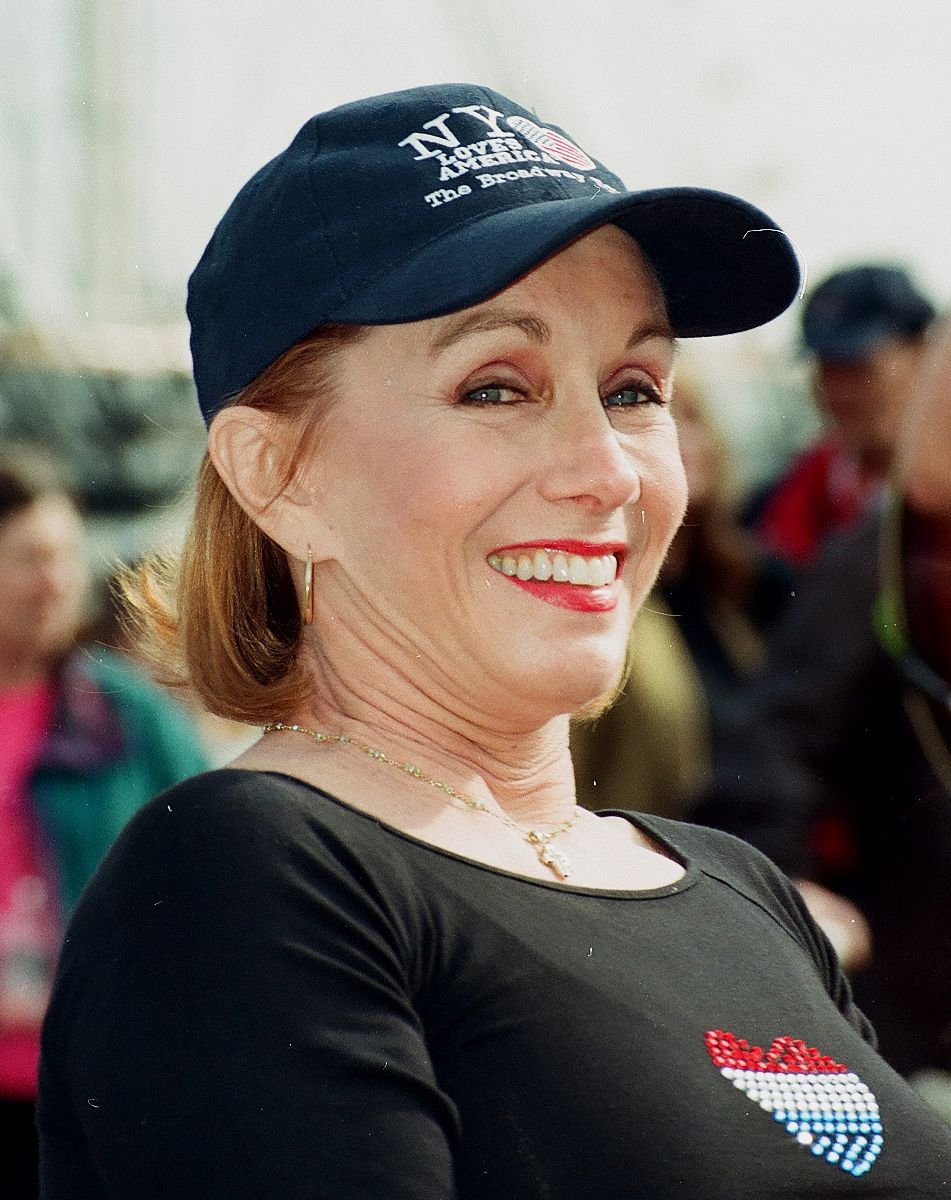
Duncan in 1999

Duncan met singer-actor Bruce Scott (born Bruce Scott Zaharaides) during the Off-Broadway production of Your Own Thing, and they were married in September 1968. Their divorce, finalized in October 1972, was caused by tensions resulting from Duncan's success and rise to stardom. Duncan told People magazine in 1979 that "It was very threatening to Bruce."

Her second marriage was to Dr. Thomas Calcaterra on January 10, 1973; it lasted until 1979. Duncan met Calcaterra when he was a consulting surgeon for her brain-tumor surgery. This marriage also failed, according to Duncan, because of the demands of her 1978 nightclub act and her refusal to remain at home to be a good "doctor's wife."

Since July 21, 1980, Duncan has been married to actor and choreographer Don Correia. They have two sons. The couple performed together on stage before they wed, live in Connecticut.

Taylorville, Illinois named a street, Sandy Duncan Drive, in her honor. Her character in Funny Face and The Sandy Duncan Show, Sandy Stockton, is from Taylorville.

== Filmography ==
=== Film ===
| Year | Title | Role | Notes |
|---|---|---|---|
| 1969 | Midnight Cowboy | Woman in TV Montage | Uncredited |
| 1971 | The Million Dollar Duck | Katie Dooley | |
| 1971 | Star Spangled Girl | Amy Cooper | |
| 1978 | The Cat from Outer Space | Liz | |
| 1981 | The Fox and the Hound | Vixey | Voice Role |
| 1988 | The Backyard Show | Mom | Short Film |
| 1988 | Three Wishes | Mom | Short Film |
| 1989 | A Day at the Beach | Mom / Molly the Mermaid | Short Film |
| 1991 | Rock-a-Doodle | Peepers | Voice Role |
| 1994 | The Swan Princess | Queen Uberta | Voice Role |
| 1998 | The Swan Princess: Sing Along | Queen Uberta (Voice Role) | Short Film |
| 2001 | Never Again | Natasha | |
| 2001 | G Spots? | The Queen | Short Film |
| 2016 | Life is Funny | N/A | Short Film (co-producer) |

=== Television ===
| Year | Title | Role | Notes |
|---|---|---|---|
| 1964 | Search for Tomorrow | Helen | 2 episodes |
| 1970 | The Jackie Gleason Show | Herself (Guest) | "#4.15" |
| 1970–1971 | What's My Line? | Herself (Panelist) | 2 episodes |
| 1971 | Bonanza | Angeline | "An Earthquake Called Callahan" |
| 1971 | Funny Face | Sandy Stockton | series regular (13 episodes) |
| 1972 | The New Scooby-Doo Movies | Herself (Voice Role) | "Sandy Duncan's Jekyll and Hyde" |
| 1972 | The Sandy Duncan Show | Herself | series regular (13 episodes) |
| 1972 | The Sonny and Cher Comedy Hour | Herself (Guest) | "#2.11" |
| 1972–1973 | Rowan & Martin's Laugh-In | Herself (Guest Performer) | 2 episodes |
| 1972–1976 | The Hollywood Squares | Herself (Panelist) | 21 episodes |
| 1972–1979 | The Hollywood Squares | Herself (Panelist) | 130 episodes |
| 1972–1990 | The Tonight Show Starring Johnny Carson | Herself (Guest) | 38 episodes |
| 1973–1979 | The $10,000 Pyramid | Herself (Celebrity Contestant) | 45 episodes |
| 1974 | Password | Herself (Celebrity Contestant) | "11.26.1974" |
| 1974–1978 | The $25,000 Pyramid | Herself (Celebrity Contestant) | 6 episodes |
| 1975 | The Bob Hope Show | Herself (Guest) | 1 episode |
| 1975–1980 | Dinah! | Herself (Guest) | 10 episodes |
| 1976 | Pinocchio | Pinocchio | TV movie |
| 1976 | Good Heavens | Patti | "The Big Break" |
| 1976 | The Six Million Dollar Man | Gillian | "The Return of Bigfoot: Part 1" |
| 1976 | The Bionic Woman | Gillian | "The Return of Bigfoot: Part 2" |
| 1976 | Christmas in Disneyland | Tour Guide / Snow White | TV movie |
| 1976 | The Muppet Show | Herself (Special Guest Star) | "Sandy Duncan" |
| 1977 | Roots | Missy Anne Reynolds | Miniseries (2 episodes) |
| 1977 | The Love Boat | Sharon Barker | "Lost and Found / The Understudy / Married Singles" |
| 1980 | Omnibus | Peter Pan | "06.15.1980" |
| 1984 | My Little Pony: Rescue at Midnight Castle | Firefly / Applejack / Medley (Voice Role) | TV Short |
| 1986 | Miss Universe Pageant | Herself (Judge) | TV special |
| 1987 | Act II | Meg Madison | TV movie |
| 1987–1991 | Valerie's Family / The Hogan Family | Sandy Hogan | main cast (season 3 onwards) |
| 1988 | ALF | Herself | "We Are Family" |
| 1988 | Barney & the Backyard Gang | Michael and Amy's Mom | Direct-to-video series (3 episodes) |
| 1989 | My Boyfriend's Back | Chris Henry | TV movie |
| 1993 | Miracle on Interstate 880 | Lorrie Helm | TV movie |
| 1995 | Law & Order | Defense Attorney Michelle "Shelly" Kates | "Paranoia" |
| 1999 | Jeopardy! | Herself (Celebrity Contestant) | "1999-B Celebrity Jeopardy! Game #5" |
| 1999–2000 | A Little Curious | Mrs. Shoe / Lacey | main cast; as Sandy Correia |
| 2014–2015 | Law & Order: Special Victims Unit | Trial Judge Virginia Farrell | 2 episodes |
| 2020 | Scooby-Doo and Guess Who? | Herself (Voice Role) | "The Dreaded Remake of Jekyll & Hyde!" |

=== Theater ===
- The King and I (1958)
- Billion Dollar Baby (1961)
- South Pacific (1962)
- Show Boat (1963)
- Apollo and Miss Agnes (1963)
- My Fair Lady (1964)
- The Sound of Music (1964)
- Brigadoon (1965)
- The Music Man (1965)
- Carousel (1966)
- Peter Pan (1966)
- The Sound of Music (1967)
- Finian's Rainbow (1967)
- Life with Father (1967)
- Wonderful Town (1967)
- The Ceremony of Innocence (play) (1968)
- Your Own Thing (1968)
- Canterbury Tales (1969)
- Love Is a Time of Day (1969)
- The Boy Friend (1970)
- Vanities (1976)
- Peter Pan (1979–1981)
- 5-6-7-8... Dance! (1984)
- My One and Only (1985–1986)
- Waitin' in the Wings (1986)
- Chicago (1996–1997)
- Jubilee (1998)
- Two for the Show (1999)
- The Witches of Eastwick (1999) (reading)
- Anything Goes (2002)
- The Fourth Wall (2002)
- The Grass Harp (2003)
- The King and I (2004)
- Mame (2006)
- Mud Donahue's Eccentric Son (2007)
- No, No, Nanette (2008)
- Driving Miss Daisy (2009)
- The Glass Menagerie (2009)
- Driving Miss Daisy (2014)
- Finding Neverland (2016)
- Love Letters (2018)

== Awards and nominations ==
| Year | Award | Category | Nominated work | Result | Ref. |
|---|---|---|---|---|---|
| 1970 | Drama Desk Awards | Outstanding Performance | The Boy Friend | Won | |
| 1980 | Drama Desk Awards | Outstanding Actress in a Musical | Peter Pan | Nominated | |
| 1971 | Golden Globe Awards | Best Actress in a Motion Picture – Musical or Comedy | Star Spangled Girl | Nominated | |
| 1971 | Golden Globe Awards | Most Promising Newcomer – Female | The Million Dollar Duck | Nominated | |
| 1972 | Primetime Emmy Awards | Outstanding Continued Performance by an Actress in a Leading Role in a Comedy Series | Funny Face | Nominated | |
| 1977 | Primetime Emmy Awards | Outstanding Single Performance by a Supporting Actress in a Comedy or Drama Series | Roots | Nominated | |
| 1968 | Theatre World Awards | —N/a | Ceremony of Innocence | Won | |
| 1969 | Tony Awards | Best Supporting or Featured Actress in a Musical | Canterbury Tales | Nominated | |
| 1971 | Tony Awards | Best Leading Actress in a Musical | The Boy Friend | Nominated | |
| 1980 | Tony Awards | Best Leading Actress in a Musical | Peter Pan | Nominated | |
