= The Adventures of Buratino =

The Adventures of Buratino may refer to:

- The Golden Key, or the Adventures of Buratino, a fairytale by Alexei Tolstoy
- The Adventures of Buratino (1959 film)
- The Adventures of Buratino (1975 film)
- The Adventures of Buratino, a 1993 Russian computer game
