= Buratino =

Fictional character created by Aleksey Nikolayevich Tolstoy

Buratino Russian: Буратино
- The Adventures of Buratino character
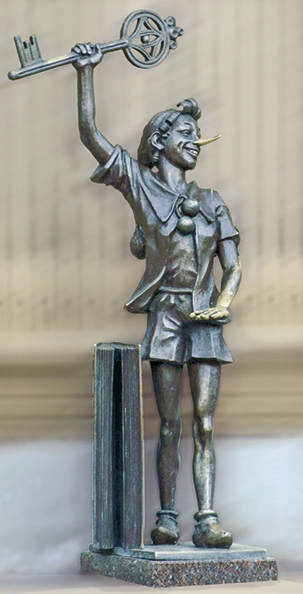
- Monument to Buratino
- First appearance: The Golden Key, or The Adventures of Buratino (1936)
- Created by: Aleksey Tolstoy

In-universe information
- Species: Wooden marionette
- Gender: Male
- Family: Papa Carlo (father)
- Birthplace: Italy

Buratino (Russian: Буратино) is the main character of Aleksey Nikolayevich Tolstoy's 1936 fairy tale The Golden Key, or The Adventures of Buratino, which is based on the 1883 Italian novel The Adventures of Pinocchio by Carlo Collodi. Buratino originated as a character in the commedia dell'arte. The name Buratino derives from the Italian burattino, which means "wooden puppet" or "doll". The book was published in 1936; the figure of Buratino quickly became hugely popular among children in the Soviet Union and remains so in Russia to this day (Buratino is one of the most popular characters of Russian children's literature). The story has been made into several films, including the animated 1959 film and the live-action 1975 film.

== Origin ==
According to Tolstoy, he had read Pinocchio as a child, but, having lost the book, he started re-imagining it many years later in an attempt to come up with a series of bedside stories for his own children. The resulting tale proved to be so unique and was well-liked by the author's kids that he decided to write it down and publish it. Some researchers, however, do not tend to find this explanation plausible, since the first Russian translation of Pinocchio didn't appear until Tolstoy was in his mid-twenties; while others believe he may have been originally exposed to Pinocchio in the context of another language. Miron Petrovsky, in his article on the subject, states that the book was based upon a 1924 translation made by Nina Petrovskaya (1879–1928) and edited by Tolstoy, who had already removed many of the elements absent in The Golden Key.

== Plot ==
Like Pinocchio, Buratino is a long-nosed wooden puppet. According to the story, he is carved by Papa Carlo (the story's version of Geppetto) from a log, and suddenly comes to life. Upon creation, Buratino comes out long-nosed due to Papa Carlo's sloppy woodworking. Papa Carlo tries to shorten the nose, but Buratino resists.

Papa Carlo then sells his only good jacket in order to buy textbooks for Buratino and sends him to school. However, the boy becomes distracted by an advertisement for a local puppet-theater show, and sells his textbooks to buy a ticket to the performance. There he befriends other puppets, but the evil puppet-master Karabas Barabas (Russian: Караба́с-Бараба́с, the story's Mangiafuoco character), wants to destroy Buratino for disrupting the show.

Karabas Barabas releases Buratino after he learns that Papa Carlo's home contains a secret door for which Karabas has been searching. A Golden Key that Karabas once possessed, but later lost, opens this secret door. Karabas releases Buratino and even gives him five gold coins, asking only that Buratino watch after his father's home and make sure they do not move.

The story proceeds to tell of Buratino and his friends' hunt for the Golden Key and their struggle against the evil Karabas, his loyal friend Duremar, and a couple of crooks: Alice the Fox and Basilio the Cat (based on The Fox and the Cat), who are after Buratino's coins. After that, the events proceed similarly (although not identically) to Collodi's Pinocchio until the scene where the coins are stolen, after which the plots diverge completely.

== Deviations from Collodi's story ==
- The Fairy with Turquoise Hair is in Tolstoy's version another puppet from Karabas's theatre, named Malvina. She retains the blue colour of her hair, her poodle servant (called Artemon by Tolstoy) and her function of saving Buratino from the Fox and the Cat who hanged him on a tree. To explain her presence in the forest, it is stated that she had escaped from the theatre earlier. She is represented as somewhat overprotective and less likable than Collodi's Fairy, yet she finally befriends Buratino.
- The character of Pierrot is introduced. He is in love with Malvina. Pierrot is represented as an archetypal poet (his poems are actually cited).
- Tolstoy omits most details which in the 20th century would be considered too gruesome or too moralistic, such as: Pinocchio having burned his feet; black rabbits pretending to be about to bury him; the whole Land of Toys subplot; the terrible dogfish swallowing Pinocchio and his father, etc.
- Unlike Pinocchio in the original story, Buratino never becomes a real human. Quite the contrary, he is rewarded for not following the rules of what is assumed to be right behaviour (although he attempts to kill the Cricket and sells the book Papa Carlo sold his jacket for to see the puppet show, Buratino is more heroic) and being nonconformist. In the finale, we see him playing in a new puppet theater of Carlo's.
- Buratino's nose does not grow when he lies.

== In popular culture ==
The name Buratino has been and continues to be used as branding for a variety of products and stores marketed to children in Russia and the post-Soviet states — most notable of these are the Buratino brand soft drink, which has a caramel taste, and "Golden Key" (Zolotoy klyuchik) toffee.

Buratino is also the nickname of the TOS-1 multiple launch rocket system, due to the big "nose" of the launcher.

A location in the story, The Field of Wonders (in the Land of Fools) (Поле чудес (в Стране Дураков)), is the title of the Russian adaptation of the Wheel of Fortune game show.
