= The Sisters (1957 film) =

- Poster
- Directed by: Grigori Roshal
- Written by: Boris Chirskov
- Based on: Sisters by Aleksey Nikolayevich Tolstoy
- Starring: Rufina Nifontova; Nina Veselovskaya; Vadim Medvedev; Nikolai Gritsenko; Viktor Sharlakhov; Vladimir Muravyov
- Cinematography: Leonid Kosmatov
- Edited by: Yeva Ladyzhenskaya
- Music by: Dmitry Kabalevsky
- Production company: Mosfilm
- Distributed by: Artkino Pictures
- Release date: 24 September 1957
- Running time: 98 minutes
- Country: Soviet Union
- Language: Russian

The Sisters (Russian: Сёстры, romanized: Syostry) is a 1957 Soviet epic film directed by Grigori Roshal. It based on Sisters (1918–1922), the first part of Aleksey Nikolayevich Tolstoy's The Road to Calvary trilogy.

The film depicts the Russian Empire during the First World War; two sisters in Petrograd pursue romance in the runup to the Russian Revolution.

== Plot ==
Set in 1914, the film opens with a silent scene of Katya riding in a carriage with Bessonov. The narrative then shifts to Dasha’s visit to Telegin’s apartment, a futurist evening, and her first meeting with Telegin. A fleeting encounter between Dasha and Telegin occurs in spring, though she fails to notice him. Katya receives violets from Bessonov and confesses her love for him. At an evening reception at the Smokovnikovs’, "The Modern Venus" is presented. Meanwhile, Telegin witnesses a factory strike and the brutal shooting of workers.

Dasha confronts Bessonov and later chastises Katya, prompting Katya to confess her infidelity to her husband. The sisters part ways: Katya goes to Paris, while Dasha takes her exams and travels to Samara to join their father. On a steamboat along the Volga, Dasha encounters Telegin again.

At her father’s home, Dasha learns of the assassination of Archduke Franz Ferdinand. Her father sends her to Crimea to find Katya’s husband, Nikolai Ivanovich, hoping he can help Katya overcome her turmoil in Paris. In Crimea, Bessonov tries to climb into Dasha’s room through a window, but she rejects him. Telegin arrives to bid farewell to Dasha before departing for the front as World War I begins.

Dasha receives news that Telegin is missing in action and begins working as a nurse. Katya returns to Russia, reuniting with her family in Moscow, where Nikolai Ivanovich introduces Vadim Roshchin. Meanwhile, Telegin, held captive, participates in a mutiny triggered by a Russian officer’s suicide, escapes a tribunal, and flees. Katya also becomes a nurse.

By 1917, Roshchin bids farewell to Katya before heading to the front, and they confess their love for one another. Telegin arrives in Moscow and reunites with Dasha at a hospital. He travels to Petrograd, witnessing numerous demonstrations.

During the February Revolution, Telegin returns to Moscow, where he and Dasha observe a session of the Workers' Deputies’ Council. Now married, they settle into a sparse apartment in Petrograd. Nikolai Ivanovich, while agitating soldiers at the front, is lynched after an ill-judged statement. Back in Petrograd, the sisters share secrets about Roshchin in the Telegins' apartment. Later, Roshchin visits for dinner before leaving to join the Volunteer Army.

== Production ==
The Sisters was filmed in St. Petersburg, including in the Summer Garden. Music was composed by Dmitry Kabalevsky.

== Release ==
The Sisters was released in the Soviet Union on 24 September 1957, and in the West in 1959.

It was the highest-grossing film in the Soviet Union for 1957, with 42.5 million tickets sold.
