= Pinocchio =

Fictional character created by Carlo Collodi

- The Adventures of Pinocchio character
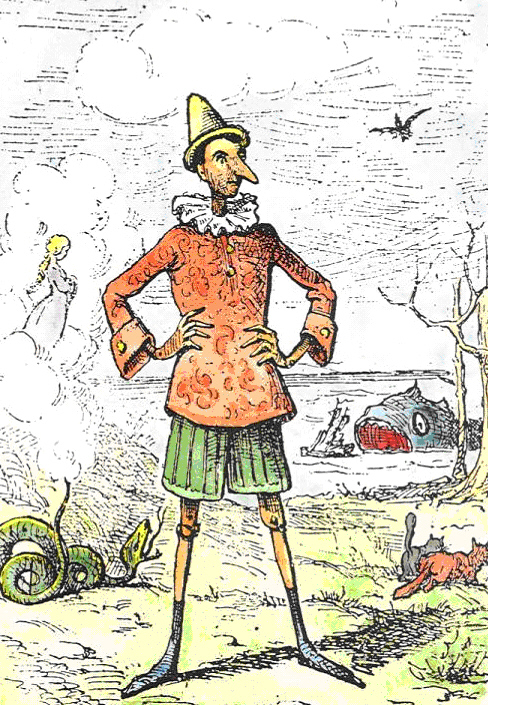
- Original art by Enrico Mazzanti
- First appearance: The Adventures of Pinocchio (1881)
- Created by: Carlo Collodi

In-universe information
- Species: Wooden marionette; donkey (briefly via shapeshifting); human
- Gender: Male
- Family: Geppetto (father); Fairy with Turquoise Hair (mother) (Note: Symbolically)
- Nationality: Italian

Pinocchio (/pɪˈnoʊkioʊ/ pin-OH-kee-oh, Italian: [piˈnɔkkjo]) is a fictional character and the protagonist of the children's novel The Adventures of Pinocchio (1881) by Italian writer Carlo Collodi of Florence, Tuscany. Pinocchio was carved by a poor man named Geppetto in a Tuscan village. He is created as a wooden puppet, but he dreams of becoming a real boy. He is known for his long nose, which grows when he lies.

Pinocchio is a cultural icon and one of the most reimagined characters in children's literature. His story has been adapted into many other media, notably the 1940 Disney film Pinocchio. Collodi often used the Italian Tuscan dialect in his book. The name Pinocchio is possibly derived from the rare Tuscan form pinocchio ("pine nut") or constructed from pino ("pine tree, pine wood") and occhio ("eye").

== Fictional character description ==
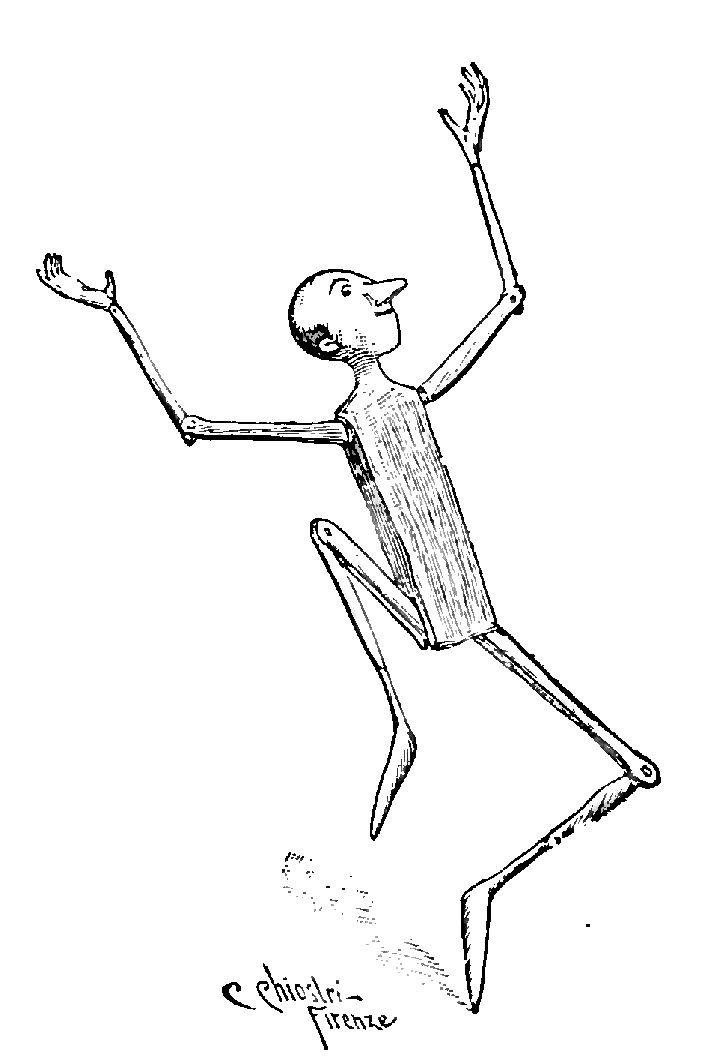
Pinocchio, by Carlo Chiostri (1901)

Pinocchio's characterization varies across interpretations, but several aspects are consistent across all adaptations: Pinocchio is an animated sentient puppet, Pinocchio's maker is Geppetto and Pinocchio's nose grows when he lies.

Pinocchio is known for having a short nose that becomes longer when he is under stress (chapter 3), especially while lying. In the original tale:

Collodi describes him as a “rascal,” “imp,” “scapegrace,” “disgrace,” “ragamuffin,” and “confirmed rogue.” “Wretched boy!” laments Pinocchio’s loving father, the carpenter Geppetto. The very first thing the puppet does upon being born is laugh derisively in Geppetto’s face. Then Pinocchio steals the sad old man’s wig.

Pinocchio's bad behavior, rather than being charming or endearing, is meant to serve as a warning. Collodi originally intended the story, which was first published in June 1881 in the children's magazine Giornale per i bambini, to be a tragedy. It concluded with the puppet's execution. Pinocchio's enemies, the Fox and the Cat, bind his arms, pass a noose around his throat, and hang him from the branch of an oak tree.

A tempestuous northerly wind began to blow and roar angrily, and it beat the poor puppet from side to side, making him swing violently, like the clatter of a bell ringing for a wedding. And the swinging gave him atrocious spasms... His breath failed him and he could say no more. He shut his eyes, opened his mouth, stretched his legs, gave a long shudder, and hung stiff and insensible.

=== Characteristics ===
==== Clothing and character ====
Pinocchio is a wooden marionette (a puppet that is manipulated with wires or strings) and not a hand puppet (directly controlled from inside by the puppeteer's hand). However, the piece of wood from which he is derived is animated, and so Pinocchio moves independently. He often gets carried away by bad company and is prone to lying. His nose becomes longer when lying to others. Because of these characteristics, he often finds himself in trouble. Pinocchio transforms in the novel: he promises The Fairy with Turquoise Hair to become a real boy, flees with Candlewick to the Land of Toys, becomes a donkey, joins a circus, and becomes a puppet again. In the last chapter, out of the mouth of The Terrible Dogfish with Geppetto, Pinocchio finally stops being a puppet and becomes a real boy (thanks to the intervention of the Fairy in a dream).

In the novel, Pinocchio is often depicted with a pointy hat, a jacket, and a pair of colored, knee-length pants. In the Disney version, the appearance is different; the character is dressed in Tyrolean style, with Lederhosen and a hat with a feather.

==== Nose ====
Pinocchio's nose is his best-known characteristic. It grows in length when he tells a lie, but also does so in the book when it is first carved by Geppetto.

The nose is mentioned only a couple of times in the book, but it reveals the Blue Fairy's power over Pinocchio when he acts disobediently. After the boy's struggling and weeping over his deformed nose, the Blue Fairy summons woodpeckers to peck it back to normal.

== Literary analysis ==
Some literary analysts have described Pinocchio as an epic hero. Like many Western literary heroes, such as Odysseus, Pinocchio descends into hell; he also experiences rebirth through metamorphosis, a common motif in fantasy literature.

Before writing Pinocchio, Collodi wrote a number of didactic children's stories for the then-recently unified Italy, including a series about an unruly boy who undergoes humiliating experiences while traveling the country, titled Viaggio per l'Italia di Giannettino ("Little Johnny's voyage through Italy"). Throughout Pinocchio, Collodi chastises Pinocchio for his lack of moral fiber and his persistent rejection of responsibility and desire for fun.

The structure of the story of Pinocchio follows that of the folktales about peasants who venture out into the world but are naïvely unprepared for what they find and get into ridiculous situations. At the time of the writing of the book, this was a serious problem, arising partly from the industrialization of Italy, which led to a growing need for reliable labour in the cities; the problem was exacerbated by similar, more or less simultaneous, demands for labour in the industrialization of other countries. One major effect was the migration of much of the Italian peasantry to the cities, and to foreign countries such as the United States.

The main imperatives demanded of Pinocchio are to work, be good, and study. In the end, Pinocchio's willingness to provide for his father and devote himself to these things transforms him into a real boy with modern comforts.

== Media portrayals ==
=== Literature ===
- Il Segreto di Pinocchio (1894) by Gemma Mongiardini-Rembadi, published in the United States in 1913 as Pinocchio under the Sea;
- Pinocchio in Africa (1903) by Eugenio Cherubini;
- Zäpfel Kerns Abenteuer (1905) by Otto Julius Bierbaum;
- The Heart of Pinocchio (1917) by Paolo Lorenzini;
- Pinocchio in America (1928) by Angelo Patri;
- Puppet Parade (1932) by Carol Della Chiesa;
- The children's novel The Golden Key, or The Adventures of Buratino (1936) is a free retelling of the story of Pinocchio by Russian writer Aleksey Nikolayevich Tolstoy. Some of the adventures are derived from Collodi, but many are either omitted or added. Pinocchio (Buratino) does not reform himself nor become a real human. For Tolstoy, Pinocchio as a puppet is a positive model of creative and non-conformist behavior;
- Hi! Ho! Pinocchio! (1940) by Josef Marino;
- Astro Boy (鉄腕アトム, Tetsuwan Atomu) (1952), a Japanese manga series written and illustrated by Osamu Tezuka, recasts loosely the Pinocchio theme;
- Pinocchio in Venice (1991) by Robert Coover;
- Pinocchio: The Boy, (2002) children's picture book by Lane Smith. Viking Books;
- Fables (2002–2015), a comic book series by Bill Willingham, includes Pinocchio as a refugee, having fled his magical homeland and living in the mundane 21st century;
- Marvel Fairy Tales (2006–2008), a comic book series by C. B. Cebulski, features a retelling of The Adventures of Pinocchio with the robotic superhero called The Vision in the role of Pinocchio;
- Wooden Bones (2012) by Scott William Carter describes a fictional untold story of Pinocchio, with a dark twist. Pino, as he's come to be known after he became a real boy, has discovered that he has the power to bring puppets to life himself;
- Pinocchio by Pinocchio (2013) by Michael Morpurgo;
- Pinocchio was the subject of the 2015 satirical novel Splintered: A Political Fairy Tale by Thomas London;
- The Wooden Prince (2017) and Lord of Monsters (2017) by John Claude Bemis adapt the story to a science fiction setting.

=== Film ===
==== Disney version ====
Pinocchio
- Pinocchio as seen in Walt Disney's Pinocchio
- First appearance: Pinocchio (1940)
- Last appearance: Once Upon a Studio
- Portrayed by: Elijah Wood (I'm No Fool and You); Seth Adkins (Geppetto)
- Voiced by: Dickie Jones (1940); June Foray (Walt Disney's Mickey Mouse's Birthday Party, 1954 record album, Morris Minor commercial); Kevin Brando (Pinocchio's Daring Journey); Peter Westy (Who Framed Roger Rabbit); Michael Welch (1999–2004); Seth Adkins (Kingdom Hearts); Joe McDonough (Walt Disney's Parade of Dreams); Elan Garfias (Kinect: Disneyland Adventures); Nick Carson (Kingdom Hearts 3D: Dream Drop Distance); Joseph Ricci (Mickey Mouse); Benjamin Evan Ainsworth (live-action film)

When Walt Disney Productions was developing the story for their film version of Pinocchio (1940), they intended to keep the obnoxious aspects of the original character, but Walt Disney felt that this made the character too unlikable, so alterations were made to incorporate traits of mischief and innocence to make Pinocchio more likable. Pinocchio was voiced by Dickie Jones. Today, the film is considered one of the finest Disney features ever made and one of the greatest animated films of all time. In the video game adaptation of the film, Pinocchio lives out (mostly) the same role as the film, traveling through the world filled with temptations and experiencing various forces.

This Disney incarnation was later used in Who Framed Roger Rabbit, voiced by Peter Westy; and House of Mouse, voiced by Michael Welch; as well as making cameo appearances in Aladdin, Teacher's Pet, Tangled, the Mickey Mouse television series, and Ralph Breaks the Internet. Pinocchio in his human form has appeared in the live-action segments for the 1980s updated educational serials I'm No Fool and You played by Elijah Wood. Child actor Seth Adkins portrayed Pinocchio in the television musical film Geppetto (2000).

Pinocchio is a supporting character, voiced by Seth Adkins, in the Kingdom Hearts video game series. He plays a major role in the eponymous first game, Kingdom Hearts: Chain of Memories, and Kingdom Hearts 3D: Dream Drop Distance, while in Kingdom Hearts II he appears during a flashback at the early stages.

In Kinect Disneyland Adventures, he appears as a meet-and-greet character in Fantasyland and has several quests for the player. In Epic Mickey: Power of Illusion, Pinocchio is featured as one of the many iconic Disney characters kidnapped by the evil witch Mizrabel in her plot to dominate their world; he is imprisoned alongside Genie in the Cave of Wonders until eventually being rescued by Mickey Mouse.

In March 2021, it was announced that Benjamin Evan Ainsworth would play him in Disney's 2022 live-action/CGI remake of the animated film.

=== Other film adaptations ===
==== 20th century ====
- Pinocchio first appeared in a cinematic adaptation in The Adventures of Pinocchio, a 1911 Italian live-action silent film, directed by Giulio Antamoro. The character is performed by French-Italian comedian Ferdinand Guillaume in an all-adult cast;
- A 1936 adaptation The Adventures of Pinocchio (Le avventure di Pinocchio) was planned in Italy by Raoul Verdini and Umberto Spano, but it was never entirely completed and is now considered lost. Only the original script and some still frames are all that survived from the film;
- The Golden Key (Zolotoy Klyuchik) is a 1939 Russian movie combining live-action and stop-motion animation, directed by Aleksandr Ptushko. The story is based on the novel The Golden Key, or The Adventures of Buratino (1936) by Aleksey Nikolayevich Tolstoy. Pinocchio (Buratino) is a puppet voiced by actress Olga Shaganova-Obraztsova;
- The first child actor to portray Pinocchio was Alessandro Tommei in the 1947 Italian film The Adventures of Pinocchio (Le avventure di Pinocchio), directed by Gianetto Guardone;

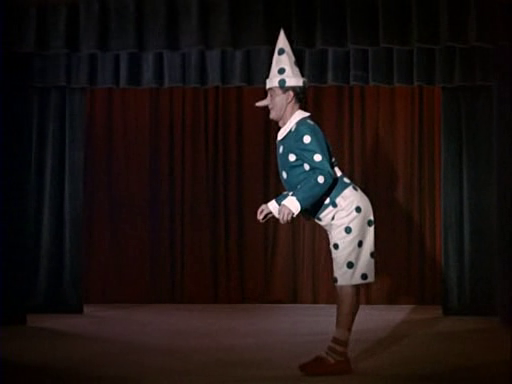
Totò portrayed Pinocchio in Toto in Color (1952).

- Italian comedian Totò portrayed Pinocchio in the 1952 film Toto in Color (Totò a colori);
- Actor Mel Blanc voiced Pinocchio in a 1953 radio adaptation of the story. This is the second adaptation of Pinocchio with Mel Blanc involved, as Blanc voiced Gideon the Cat in the 1940 Disney film until all of his lines were deleted, save for three hiccups;
- The Adventures of Buratino (Priklyucheniya Buratino) is a 1959 Soviet animated feature film directed by Dmitriy Babichenko and Ivan Ivanov-Vano. The story is based on the novel The Golden Key, or The Adventures of Buratino (1936) by Aleksey Nikolayevich Tolstoy. Pinocchio (Buratino) is voiced by actress Nina Gulyaeva and in the 1998 shortened English-dubbed version (Pinocchio and the Golden Key), by child actor Joseph Mazzello;
- In Pinocchio (1965), the character is portrayed by actor John Joy;
- In the Belgian-American animated film Pinocchio in Outer Space (1965), the character is voiced by actor Peter Lazer;
- Pinocchio (Turlis Abenteuer) (1967) is an East German film, directed by Walter Beck. Pinocchio (Turli) is a puppet, voiced by actress Gina Prescott. In the final scene, as a boy, he is portrayed by Uwe Thielisch;
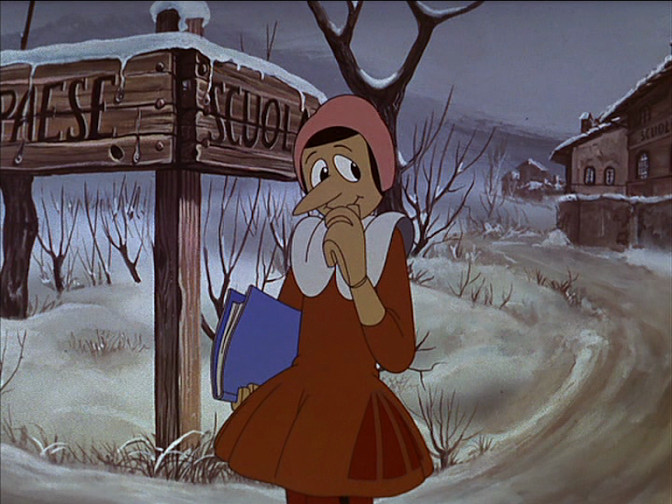
- Pinocchio as portrayed in Giuliano Cenci's film The Adventures of Pinocchio (1972).
  The Adventures of Pinocchio (Un burattino di nome Pinocchio, 1972) is an Italian animated film, written and directed by Giuliano Cenci. Pinocchio is voiced by actress Roberta Paladini in the Italian version;
- Pinocchio and His Magic Show is a 1976 American movie. Pinocchio is a puppet, voiced by actress Ellen Prince;
- The Adventures of Buratino (Priklyucheniya Buratino) is a 1975 Soviet children's musical film directed by Leonid Nechayev. The story is based on the novel The Golden Key, or The Adventures of Buratino (1936) by Aleksey Nikolayevich Tolstoy. Pinocchio (Buratino) is portrayed by child actor Dmitri Iosifov;
- The 1977 animated film Spinnolio, created by John Weldon for the National Film Board of Canada, parodies Pinocchio with the story of a wooden boy who never comes to life, but nobody notices because his apparent skill at listening without talking makes him the ideal candidate for a job as manager of a department store's complaints desk;
- Si Boneka Kayu, Pinokio (Pinocchio the wood puppet) is the 1979 Indonesian musical film, directed by Willy Willian, written by Imam Tantowi and based on the original story with some additional adaptations. Pinocchio is portrayed by the Indonesian actor and comedian Ateng;
- Pinocchio appeared in the French-Dutch TV musical film Abbacadabra (1983), directed by Rien van Wijk. He was portrayed by actor Nico Haak;
- Pinocho is a 1986 Argentinian movie, directed by Alejandro Malowichi. Pinocchio is portrayed by an actress Soledad Silveyra;
- Pinocchio appeared in Filmation's 1987 epic animated film Pinocchio and the Emperor of the Night voiced by Scott Grimes;
- In the 1988 animation The Adventures of Pinocchio, directed by Ippei Kuri and Jim Terry, Pinocchio is voiced by actress Danielle Romeo;
- He appears in the 1991 animated film The Magic Riddle, voiced by Keith Scott;
- Pinocchio appeared in the 1993 direct-to-video adaptation by GoodTimes Entertainment, voiced by Jeannie Elias;
- He appeared in the horror film Pinocchio's Revenge (1996) played by Verne Troyer and voiced by Dick Beals. He appears as a killer puppet;
- He was portrayed by Jonathan Taylor Thomas in the film The Adventures of Pinocchio (1996). Thomas also voiced the title character's puppet form. In the 1999 sequel The New Adventures of Pinocchio, Pinocchio was played by Gabriel Thomson (who also voiced his puppet form);
- He was portrayed by actor Carmelo Bene in the Italian TV movie Pinocchio ovvero lo spettacolo della provvidenza (1999).

==== 21st century ====
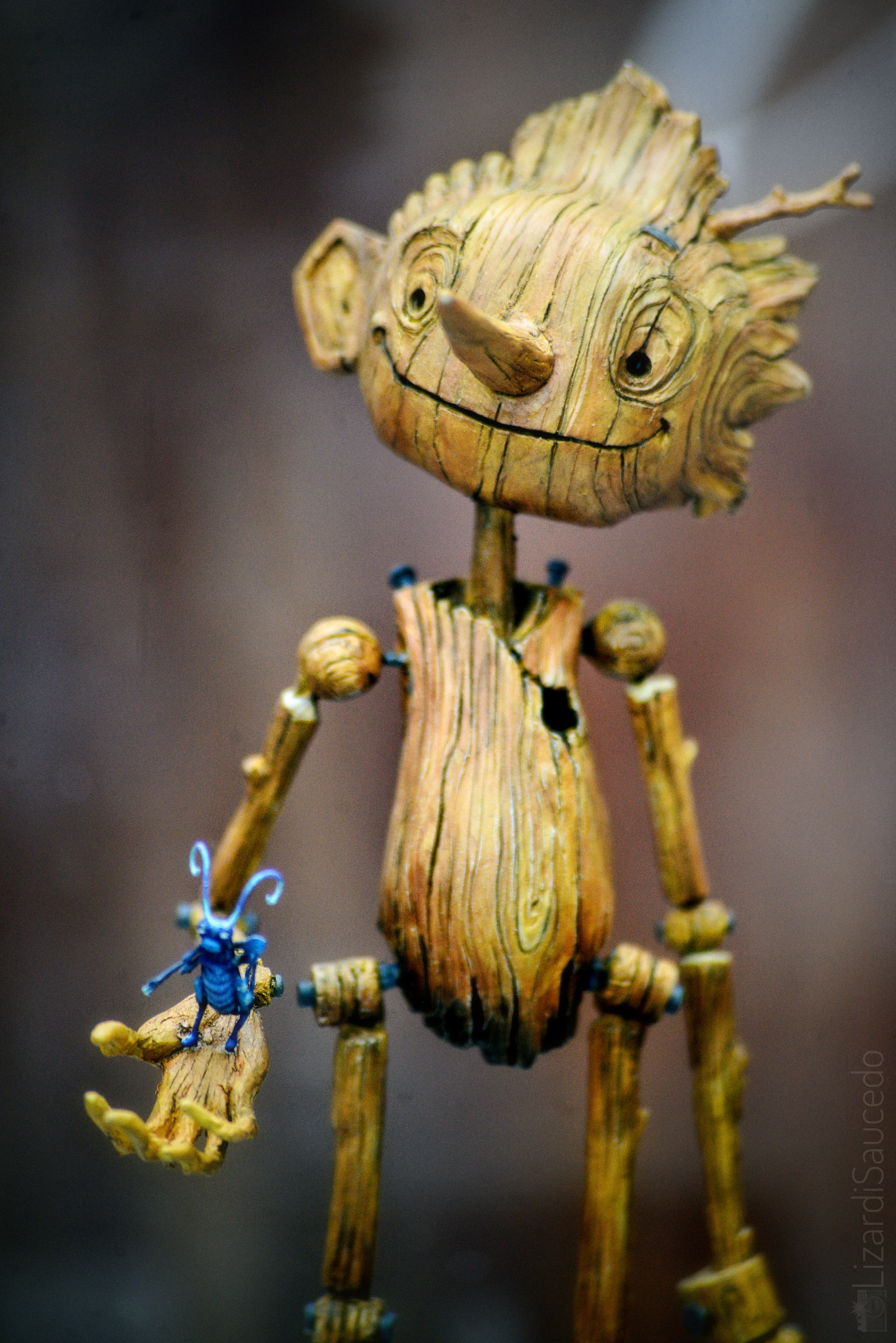
Resin sculpture of Pinocchio and Sebastian used in Guillermo del Toro's Pinocchio (2022)

- Steven Spielberg's 2001 film A.I. Artificial Intelligence is referred to as an adaptation of Pinocchio. Stanley Kubrick called A.I. "a picaresque robot version of Pinocchio";
- Pinocchio appears as a supporting character in the animated films Shrek (2001), Shrek 2 (2004), Shrek the Third (2007), Shrek Forever After (2010), and Puss in Boots: The Last Wish (2022), voiced by Cody Cameron. He was also featured in other animated shorts and videos of the same series: Shrek in the Swamp Karaoke Dance Party (2001), Shrek 4-D (2003), Far Far Away Idol (2004), Shrek the Halls (2007), Scared Shrekless (2010), Donkey's Christmas Shrektacular (2010), and Thriller Night (2011);
- Actor Roberto Benigni portrayed Pinocchio in the 2002 Italian movie Pinocchio, while the English dub voice was provided by Breckin Meyer;
- Pinocchio 3000 is a 2004 animated film, directed by Daniel Robichaud. Pinocchio, a robot that was built by Geppetto, is voiced by Canadian actress Sonja Ball in English;
- In Alberto Sironi's 2008 miniseries, Pinocchio was portrayed by Robbie Kay. In this adaptation Pinocchio has the physical appearance of a real human boy from the very first moment he comes to life instead of being a CGI character and it's stated he's still made of wood on the inside;
- In the 2012 Italian animated adaptation Pinocchio, directed by Enzo D'Alò, Pinocchio is voiced by child actor Gabriele Caprio in the Italian original version. In the English dub, he is voiced by child actor Robert Naylor in the Canadian release, and by singer Johnny Orlando in the American one.
- Child actor Federico Ielapi portrayed Pinocchio in the live-action Italian film Pinocchio (2019), co-written, directed and co-produced by Matteo Garrone. Prosthetic makeup was used to turn Ielapi into a puppet. Ielapi also dubbed himself in the English-language version of the movie;
- Jordan Worsley and Pauly Shore voices Pinocchio in the English dub of the 2022 Russian direct-to-DVD animated film Pinocchio: A True Story;
- In 2022, Disney released Pinocchio, a live action remake of their 1940 animated version, directed by Robert Zemeckis from a screenplay by Zemeckis and Chris Weitz;
- In 2022, Netflix released a stop-motion musical film titled Pinocchio, inspired by Gris Grimly's original design for Pinocchio, and co-directed by Guillermo del Toro and Mark Gustafson. The film stars Gregory Mann in the title role, along with Ewan McGregor as Sebastian J. Cricket, and David Bradley playing Geppetto. Unlike the original story or any other versions of it, Pinocchio stays a wooden puppet at the end of the movie but was still considered at the end, by his loved ones including the Wood Sprite (the movie's counterpart to the Fairy with Turquoise Hair) (voiced by Tilda Swinton, who also voiced Death, the Sprite's sister) as already a real boy. The film received an Oscar nomination for Best Animated Feature in January 2023 and subsequently won;
- A horror reimagining titled Pinocchio Unstrung was produced by Jagged Edge Productions. It was teased at the end of their horror film Winnie-the-Pooh: Blood and Honey 2, itself a horror imagining of the children's franchise Winnie-the-Pooh. Pinocchio Unstrung shares the same universe as Blood and Honey.

=== Television ===
- Musician and comedian Spike Jones portrayed Pinocchio in the first television adaptation, a satirical version aired 24 April 1954 as an episode of The Spike Jones Show;
- Pinocchio was portrayed by thirteen-year-old Andrew Irvine as "Nokie" in the 1955 ITV children's series Round at the Redways;
- Mickey Rooney was Pinocchio in the television musical adaptation Pinocchio (1957), directed by Paul Bogart, aired 13 October 1957;
- In the 1959 Italian television series The Adventures of Pinocchio (Le avventure di Pinocchio), directed by Enrico D'Alessandro and Cesare Emilio Gaslini, Pinocchio is portrayed by Carlo Chamby;
- The New Adventures of Pinocchio (1960–61) is an American animated television series. Pinocchio is voiced by actress Joan Fowler;
- De avonturen van Pinokkio (1968–1969) is a Dutch TV miniseries. Pinocchio is portrayed by Wieteke van Dort;
- Tatsunoko Productions created a 52-episode anime series entitled Pinocchio: The Series, first aired in 1972. This series has a distinctly darker, more sadistic theme, and portrays the main character Pinocchio (Mokku) as suffering from constant physical and psychological abuse and freak accidents. Pinocchio was voiced by actress Hiroko Maruyama and in the 1992 English-dubbed version by actor Thor Bishopric;
- Pinocchio (1968) is an American musical TV film, directed by Sid Smith. It was aired on 8 December 1968 in the series Hallmark Hall of Fame. Pinocchio is portrayed by actor Peter Noone;
- The Adventures of Pinocchio (Le avventure di Pinocchio, 1972) is an Italian television miniseries, co-written and directed by Luigi Comencini. Pinocchio was portrayed by child actor Andrea Balestri;
- In 1973, Piccolo, a kaiju based on Pinocchio, appeared in episode 46 of Ultraman Taro;
- Another anime series starring Pinocchio, entitled Piccolino no Bōken, was produced by Nippon Animation in 1976.
- Pinocchio is a 1976 American television musical film, directed by Ron Field and Sid Smith, aired 27 March 1976. Pinocchio is portrayed by Sandy Duncan;
- In 1976, Pinocchio appeared in a News Flash segment on Sesame Street, performed by Frank Oz;
- Pinocchio is a 1978 British television miniseries produced by the BBC in 4 episodes, directed by Barry Letts. Pinocchio is a puppet voiced by actress Rosemary Miller. In the final scene, he is portrayed by child actor Joshua White;
- In 1980, Pinocchio appeared in the "Señor Wences" episode of The Muppet Show, performed by Steve Whitmire. His puppet was built by Bob Payne;
- In the 1980 animation Pinocchio's Christmas, directed by Jules Bass and Arthur Rankin Jr., Pinocchio is voiced by child actor Todd Porter;
- Pinocchio (1984) is an episode of the American television series Faerie Tale Theatre, directed by Peter Medak. Pinocchio is portrayed by actor Paul Reubens;
- Pinocchio was featured in a 1997 episode of the animated series Happily Ever After: Fairy Tales for Every Child, voiced by actor Will Smith;
- Child actor Seth Adkins portrayed Pinocchio in the television musical film Geppetto (2000) and as a guest star, in an episode of The Drew Carey Show, aired 1 March 2000. He also voiced the character in the video game Kingdom Hearts (2002);
- Pinocchio appeared in the Australian television series Fairy Tale Police Department (2001–2002), where he works at F.T.P.D. Pinocchio is voiced by actress Maggie Dence;
- Child actor Robbie Kay was Pinocchio in the two-episode TV film Pinocchio (2008), directed by Alberto Sironi;
- Pinocchio appeared in 2010 in the animated television series Simsala Grimm in an episode of the same name;
- Pinocchio is a recurring character in the television series Once Upon a Time (2011–2016). He appears in Storybrooke in the form of a mysterious man named August Booth (played by Eion Bailey). In the Enchanted Forest, his younger self is played by Jakob Davies, but he was released into our world before the curse by Geppetto; Geppetto had been charged with making a magic cabinet to allow Snow White and series protagonist Emma Swan to escape the curse, but Geppetto arranged for Pinocchio to enter the cabinet instead as he feared that his son would cease to exist if the curse was cast as there would have been no way for him to be born without magic. August begins to return to his wooden state towards the end of the first season due to his selfishness, but following his near-death by Tamara, the Blue Fairy restored Pinocchio to his child self for his compassion and courage and he resumes living with Geppetto. In the fourth season, he was restored to his adult state by Rumplestiltskin so that he could torture him for information about the Author. In the sixth season, it was revealed that August was the one who inspired Emma to take on the surname Swan after he shared with her the fairy tale The Ugly Duckling when they were kids;
- Pinocchio appeared as a villain in two episodes of The Grim Adventures of Billy & Mandy (2004 and 2006), voiced by Scott Menville. He desires to become a real boy but by eating a real boy's flesh;
- Pinocchio, a 2013 German miniseries starring Mario Adorf and Benjamin Sadler;
- Actor Sigurður Þór Óskarsson portrayed Pinocchio in an episode ("New Kid in Town") of the TV series LazyTown, aired 5 October 2014;
- Pinocchio, a 2014–2015 South Korean television series starring Lee Jong-suk and Park Shin-Hye;
- Rooster Teeth's web series RWBY features a character named Penny Polendina, who alludes to Pinocchio;
- Pinocchio appeared as the main character in the anthology horror comedy series JJ Villard's Fairy Tales, with John Kassir playing the role of the title puppet and his creator Gelato (an allusion to Geppetto);
- The horror season of Dropout's web series Dimension 20, entitled Neverafter (2022), features Pinocchio as a principal character, played by Lou Wilson.

=== Stage productions ===
- Pinocchio (1961–1999), by Carmelo Bene;
- Pinocchio (1993) adapted by David Gilles. Produced by MTYP (Winnipeg, Manitoba, Canada). Starring Derek Aasland as Pinocchio and Harry Nelken as Geppetto. Review "Pinocchio's Fun Contagious" - Winnipeg Free Press - Preview Play Probes Pinocchio - Winnipeg Free Press;
- Pinocchio (2002), musical by Saverio Marconi and musics by Pooh;
- Pinokkio (2000–2008), Flemish musical by Studio 100;
- The Adventures of Pinocchio is a 2007 opera in two acts by English composer Jonathan Dove with a libretto by Alasdair Middleton. The original production opened at the Grand Theatre, Leeds on 21 December 2007 with mezzo-soprano Victoria Simmonds as Pinocchio;
- Actor John Tartaglia portrayed Pinocchio in the original Broadway cast of Shrek the Musical (2008) as well as in the 2013 filmed version;
- L'altro Pinocchio (2011), musical by Vito Costantini based on L'altro Pinocchio (Editrice La Scuola, Brescia 1999);
- Pinocchio. Storia di un burattino di Carlo Collodi by Massimiliano Finazzer Flory (2012);
- The Adventures of Pinocchio is a 2009 opera by Israeli composer Jonathan Dove, "for 3 actors, flute, oboe, clarinet, horn, bassoon and piano";
- The musical Pinocchio - Superstar was produced by Norberto Bertassi and performed by the young talents association Teatro. Premiered on 20 July 2016 in Mödling, Austria;
- Pinocchio (2017), musical by Dennis Kelly, with songs from 1940 Disney movie, directed by John Tiffany, premiered on the National Theatre, London;
- The Making of Pinocchio — "a true tale of love and transition told through the story of Pinocchio" — is a contemporary interpretation by Rosana Cade and Ivor MacAskill, which had its UK premiere at the Battersea Arts Centre as part of the London International Festival of Theatre in 2022.

=== Miscellaneous ===
- Lies of P, a video game developed by Round8 Studio, is loosely based on the original 1883 novel;
- New Zealand singer Maria Dallas released a single titled Pinocchio in 1970 which reached #1 on the New Zealand charts. The song was also on the album of the same name.
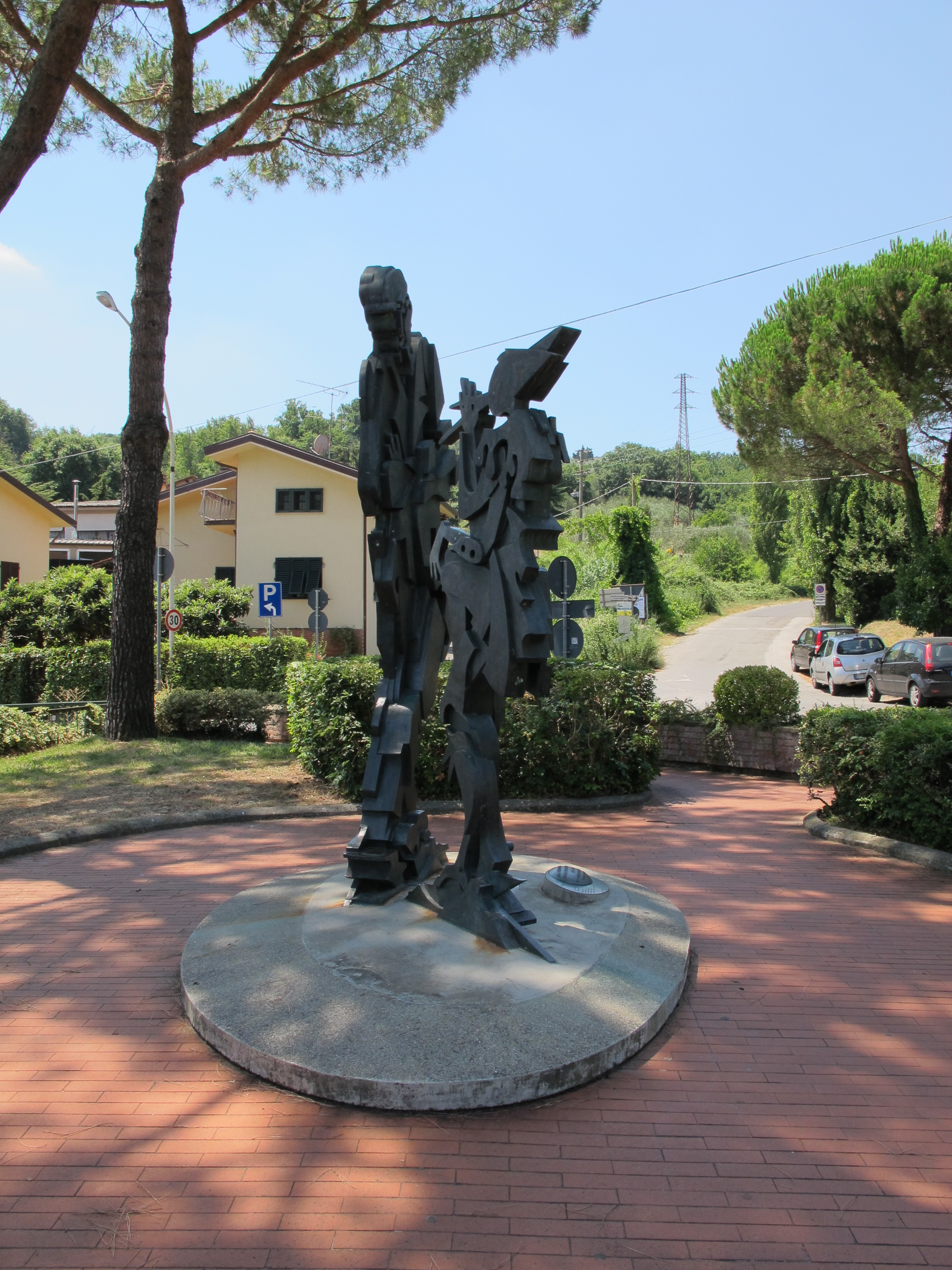
Statue of Pinocchio and Geppetto in Collodi

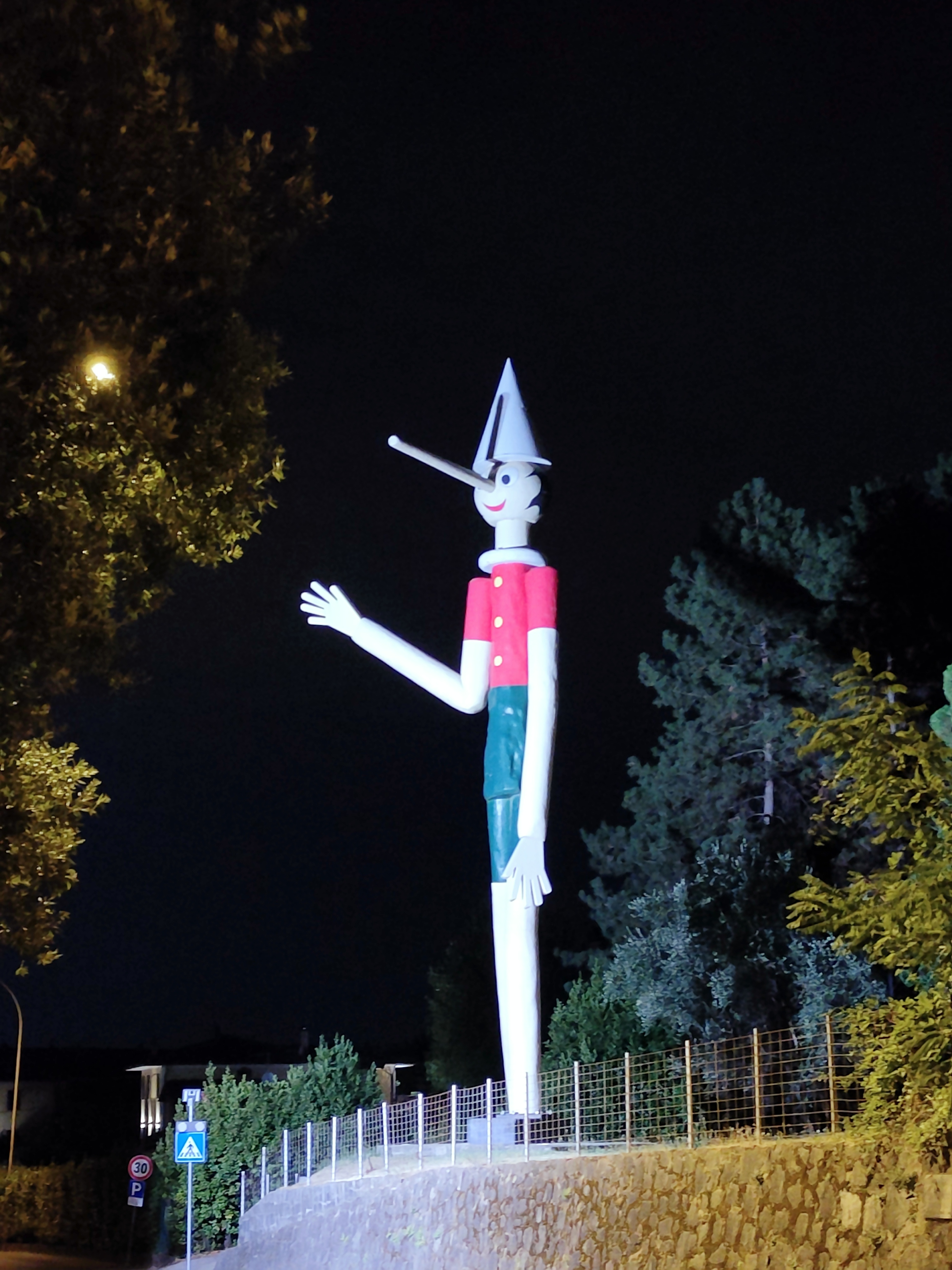
Giant statue of Pinocchio at Parco di Pinocchio, Pescia, Italy

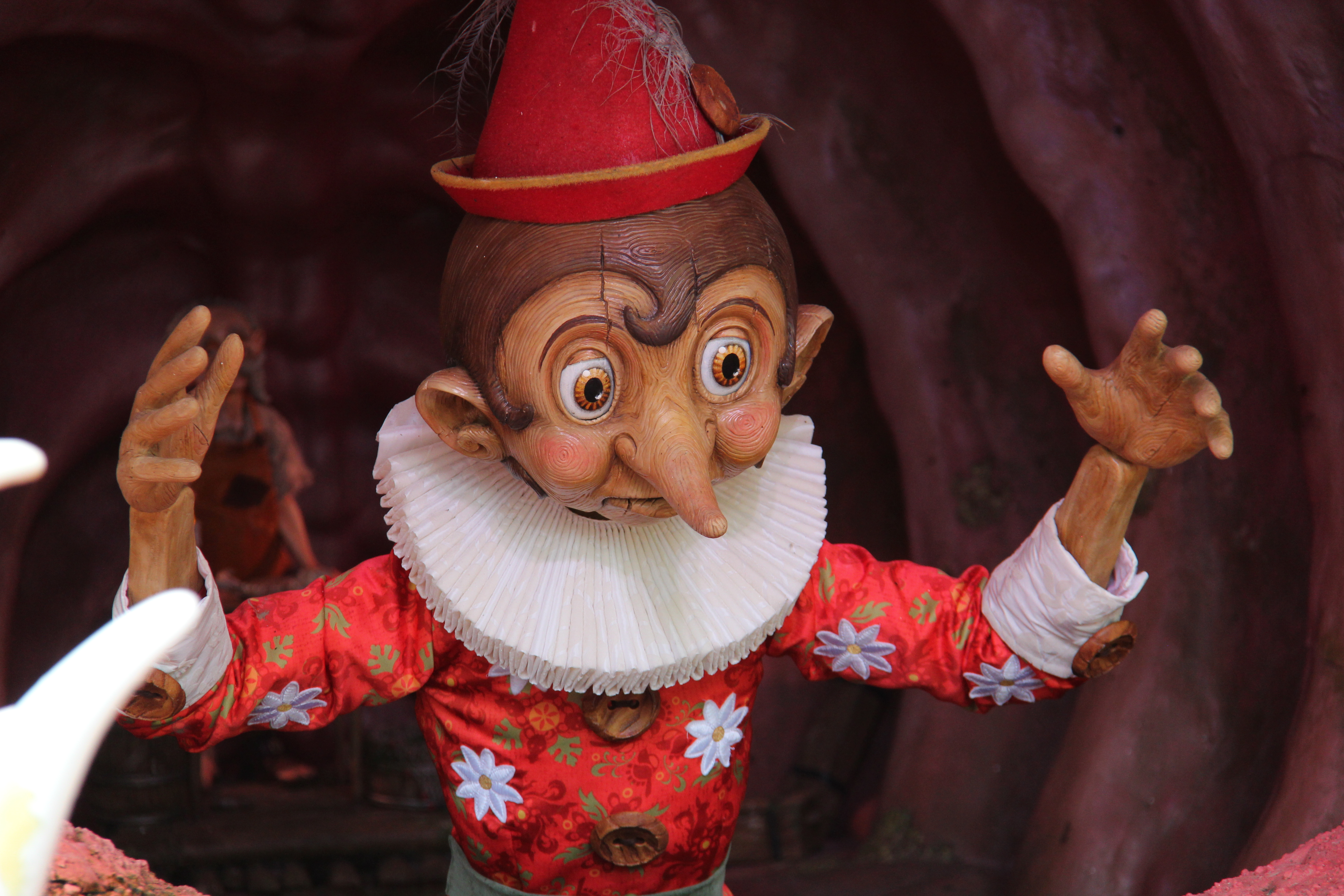
Pinocchio in Efteling, the Netherlands

"Lying face" emoji

== See also ==
- Pinocchio paradox
- Buratino
- Ivasyk-Telesyk, Ukrainian wooden boy
- Kichuś majstra Lepigliny (known as the "Polish Pinocchio")
