= The Golden Key (1939 film) =

- Film
- Russian: Золотой ключик
- Directed by: Aleksandr Ptushko
- Written by: Carlo Collodi; Nikolay Leshchenko (book); Lyudmila Tolstaya; Aleksei Tolstoy
- Produced by: Aleksandr Ptushko
- Starring: Aleksandr Shchagin; Sergey Martinson; Olga Shaganova-Obraztsova; Georgiy Uvarov; Nikolay Bogolyubov
- Cinematography: Nikolai Renkov
- Music by: Lev Shvarts
- Production company: Mosfilm
- Release date: 1 July 1939
- Running time: 78 min.
- Country: Soviet Union
- Language: Russian

The Golden Key (Russian: Золотой ключик, romanized: Zolotoy klyuchik) is a 1939 Soviet fairy-tale movie directed by Aleksandr Ptushko. It is based on the Russian tale The Golden Key, or The Adventures of Buratino by Aleksey Tolstoy, originally inspired by the story of Pinocchio written by Carlo Collodi. In 2009, Russia TV adapted both the original and its remake into a musical.

== Plot ==
In a fairy tale, Carlo the charmer carves a wooden puppet out of a log. Buratino embarks on amazing adventures, defeating all his enemies. The original play's plot lines differ from "The Golden Key", or "The Adventures of Buratino", the movie's ending is filmed according to the play. Buratino and his friends open the cherished door with the golden key, reach the magic book, and, on the airship descended from its pages, join Soviet polar explorers in a journey to the country where "all children study in schools, and old people live gloriously."

== Starring ==
- Aleksandr Shchagin as Karabas Barabas
- Sergey Martinson as Duremar, village knave
- Olga Shaganova-Obraztsova as Buratino (voice)
- Georgiy Uvarov as Papa Carlo
- Nikolay Bogolyubov as Captain of the airship
- Mikhail Dagmarov as Giuseppe
- Tamara Adelgeym as Malvina (voice)
- R. Khairova as Pierrot (voice)
- Nikolai Michurin as Sandro
- Konstantin Nikiforov as Puppet master
- V. Pokorskaya as Puppet master
- F. Tikhonova as Puppet master
- Vasiliy Krasnoshchyokov as Policeman (uncredited)
- Georgiy Millyar as Clown (uncredited)

== Production ==
In scenes featuring puppet characters, including Buratino himself, a combination of classical frame-by-frame three-dimensional animation and the method of perspective matching was used. The former was applied primarily when Buratino interacted with Shushara, Tortila, Alice, and Basilio, with all of them portrayed as puppets. The latter method was used in scenes with Karabas-Barabas, Papa Carlo, and other human characters, where the actors playing them stood much closer to the camera to match the scale. Additionally, in several scenes, Buratino was represented by a marionette puppet.

In the book "The Golden Key. Notes of Buratino," Olga Shaganova-Obraztsova said that she did not portray a doll but became one herself. The audience did not realize that it was a living person. To achieve this, several measures were taken. First and foremost, the proportions had to be altered. A mask, or rather, an entire head made of papier-mâché, was placed on the actress. However, to maintain visibility, holes were made on the mask's cheeks, covered with gauze. Every effort was made to conceal any human features. The woman was encased in a plywood suit, transforming her into a "log." Tights painted to resemble wood were worn on her arms and legs, and black velvet joints were affixed to her knees and elbows. Enormous shoes and cardboard gloves were fitted onto her hands and feet.

Initially, it seemed physically impossible to move in this attire. Olga struggled to see through the mask's slits, frequently bumping into objects. The wooden corset's edges cut painfully, and the long shoes hindered her movement. Overcoming these challenges was crucial to convincingly embodying the mischievous, cheerful, wooden Buratino in both appearance and behavior. Another challenge was the need for the character to be very small, no taller than 50 cm when seated on Papa Carlo's knee. The actress's actual height was 1 m 65 cm, and the mask added 10 cm, making a total of 1 m 75 cm. The extra 125 cm could be discounted, as on screen, a person's height is perceived in relation to the surrounding objects. To maintain this illusion, all props were created oversized: stairs, stools, tables, and even the cauldron over the hearth.

During the initial test shots, Shaganova-Obraztsova barely recognized herself as she moved like a small doll while the objects appeared normal in size. Another complication emerged when Buratino had to interact with living characters like Papa Carlo and Karabas-Barabas, who were meant to appear larger. Optical alignment techniques were employed to address this issue, thanks to director Ptushko.

== Revision ==
Twenty years later, in 1959, the movie was re-dubbed. Under the direction of conductor Algis Žiuraitis, a new music track was made.

The Mosfilm logo is present at the very beginning; Pinocchio's voice timbre has changed. In the original version, Olga Obraztsova's voice was recorded clean, but in the new version, Georgy Vitsin's voice was processed with acceleration; In Papa Carlo's name, the characters now put the accent on the first syllable; A new text was written for the last verse of the final song; Some lines, which in the original version were direct quotes from the book, were changed.
