= Kichuś majstra Lepigliny =

1924 children's book by Janina Porazińska

- Author: Janina Porazińska
- Language: Polish
- Genre: Children's literature
- Publication date: 1924
- Publication place: Poland

Kichuś majstra Lepigliny (Master Lepiglina's Kichuś) is a children's book written by Polish poet Janina Porazińska, published in 1924, sometimes referred to as the "Polish Pinocchio".

== Plot ==
The book tells the story of a boy accidentally created from clay by a potter, the titular master Lepiglina. The action takes place in historical Kraków (c. the 17th century), where the clay boy, Kichuś, adopted by his creator, experiences various adventures.

== Reception ==
The work is considered one of Porazińska's more popular titles. Between 1924 and 1997, it saw around 16 editions, many of them published by the pre-war publishing house of Michał Arct, including the first edition. For many years, the book was part of the school curriculum, especially for grades from 2 to 4. It has been illustrated by various artists, such as Michał Bylina, Maria Orłowska-Gabryś, and Jacek Skrzydlewski. The 1973 edition featured illustrations by Adam Kilian, while the 1974 edition included photographs of Kraków and its surroundings by Edward Hartwig, which showcased locations where the story takes place as well as the beauty of ceramic relics, particularly craquelure. Anita Wincencjusz-Patyna praised the use of photography as educational and grounding the story in reality.

Despite its later popularity, the book initially faced criticism from conservative Catholic circles, such as a negative review in Miesięcznik Katechetyczny i Wychowawczy due to its fantastical elements. The clay-formed protagonist was likened to a demon. During the Polish People's Republic period (around 1949), the novel was briefly removed from circulation for being ideologically unsuitable, although by the mid-1950s, it had been adapted for the stage.

In the 1960s and 1970s, the book was praised by critics like Teresa Bieńkowska and Zdzisława Vogel, who noted that children aged from 7 to 8 would enjoy it. Tymon Terlecki, in the 1960s, also praised the book, describing it as a work that introduces children to 17th-century customs in an accessible way. The 1983 publication by the Polish Librarians' Association positively reviewed the novel, calling it a colourful and humorous adventure full of fantasy. The reviewer commended Porazińska's depiction of Kraków's historical architecture and landscapes, as well as her portrayal of the daily life of its inhabitants, noting that the book, though first published in 1924, would still engage young readers aged 6 and up.

== Analysis ==
The work has been inspired by the Italian classic for children, The Adventures of Pinocchio (from the early 1880s), and is sometimes referred to as the "Polish Pinocchio". The author described her inspiration for the story – setting its plot in Kraków – as connected to her patriotism and interest in Polish folklore. It is also thought to be influenced by pottery folklore.

Since the protagonist is given a moral task of "doing good", the moral of the story is described as follows: "The child reader must meet the expectations of adults and become as good as the toy hero". Kichuś is depicted as a "symbol of the ideals of goodness, love, and justice".

The language used in the work is somewhat archaic. Alina Brodzka-Wald noted that the author employs artistic subdialect stylization deliberately. The language of the text is relatively complex, with some editions containing numerous annotations. For example, the 1981 edition featured a three-page glossary of terms and words used in the story, such as "farfurowy" (porcelain), "letniczek" (summer dress), "miesiąc na widku" (full moon), and "naczynia gędziebne" (musical instruments).

== Adaptations ==
The work has been adapted for the theater several times:

- In 1955, as Kichuś, czyli przygody glinianego cudaczka (Kichuś, or the Adventures of the Clay Oddity) at the Animation Theatre, directed and adapted by Melania Karwatowa.
- In 1957, at the Children's Theatre of Zagłębie, adapted by Melania Karwat, staged and directed by Jan Dorman or Tomasz Roch, with set design by Adam Kilian and music by Franciszek Wasikowski.
- In 1959, by the Touring Puppet and Actor Theatre Kubuś.
- In 1961, at the Guliwer Puppet Theatre, adapted by Anna Chodorowska and Bohdan Grzymała-Siedlecki, directed by Zenon Chojnowski, with set design by Mieczysław Antuszewicz and music by Jerzy Dobrzański.
- In 1979, adapted by Halina Krzyżanowska for Polish Radio Theatre, directed by Maria Żabczyńska, with acoustic realization by Jerzy Jeżewski.
