= The Golden Key, or The Adventures of Buratino =

1936 fairy tale story by Alexei Tolstoy

- Author: Alexei Tolstoy
- Original title: Золотой ключик, или Приключения Буратино
- Language: Russian
- Genre: Fairy tale, children's literature
- Publication date: 1936
- Publication place: Soviet Union
- ISBN: 978-5-465-01370-3

The Golden Key, or The Adventures of Buratino (Russian: Золотой ключик, или Приключения Буратино) is a 1936 children's fantasy novel by Soviet writer Alexei Tolstoy, which is a retelling of Carlo Collodi's novel The Adventures of Pinocchio. Tolstoy dedicated the book to his future fourth and last wife, Lyudmila Krestinskaya.

== History ==
The creation of the story began when in 1923 Alexei Tolstoy, being in exile, edited the Russian translation of the fairy tale by Italian writer Carlo Collodi "The Adventures of Pinocchio. The Story of the Wooden Doll" (1883), carried out by Nina Petrovskaya. A year later this book was published in Berlin, in the publishing house "Nakanune" (when Tolstoy had already returned to the USSR).

This translation under Tolstoy's editorship is notable due to attempts to adapt Italian realities for Russian readers with the help of stylistic alterations of the text (by adding Russian proverbs, sayings, etc.). Tolstoy later used some of these adaptations to The Golden Key - in particular, in this translation, Geppetto was already renamed Carlo.

In October 1933, Tolstoy signed a contract with the publishing house "Detgiz" to write his own retelling of "Pinocchio" (co-authored with Nina Petrovskaya), but in December 1934 he had a myocardial infarction, so that Tolstoy had to postpone work on the story, and he returned to it only in the spring of 1935 (for this he had to postpone work on the trilogy The Road to Calvary).

Although Tolstoy had originally planned to simply publish his own translation of the original, he became fascinated by the original idea and created his own story, adding the story of the hearth painted on an old canvas and the golden key. In the end, he strayed quite far from the original story for the reason that it was outdated for the period of socialist realism, and also because Collodi's tale is full of moralizing and cautionary maxims. On the other hand, Tolstoy wanted to infuse the characters with a more adventurous and fun spirit.

In 1936, Tolstoy wrote the play The Golden Key for the Central Children's Theater (now Russian Academic Youth Theater) at the request of its founder Natalia Sats, and in 1939 he wrote the screenplay for a film of the same name, which was directed by Aleksandr Ptushko.

By 1986, the fairy tale was published in the USSR 182 times and was translated into 47 languages. The total circulation was 14.587 million copies.

== Characters ==
- Buratino is a wooden puppet with a long nose. Based on Pinocchio.
- Papa Carlo (Russian: Папа Карло) is a barrel organ player of little means, who created Buratino. Based on Geppetto.
- Giuseppe (Джузеппе), nicknamed "Giuseppe the Blue Nose" for always being drunk, is a woodworker and a friend of Carlo. He wanted to make a table leg from log, but got scared when it started talking and gave the log as a present to Papa Carlo. Based on Antonio.
- Karabas Barabas (Карабас-Барабас) is an evil puppeteer. He owns a puppet theater with many marionettes, including Malvina, Pierrot, and Harlequin. Based on Mangiafuoco.
- Malvina (Мальвина) is a beautiful female puppet with blue hair. Based on the Fairy with Turquoise Hair.
- Artemon (Артемон) is Malvina's loyal poodle. Based on Medoro.
- Pierrot (Пьеро) is a sad puppet and a poet who is deeply in love with Malvina.
- Harlequin (Арлекин) is Pierrot's scene partner in Karabas's theatre. He usually mocks and beats Pierrot.
- Alice the Fox (Лиса Алиса) and Basilio the Cat (Кот Базилио), two swindlers. Based on the Fox and the Cat.
- Tortila the Turtle (Черепаха Тортила) gives the Golden Key to Buratino, the same key that was lost by Karabas.
- Duremar (Дуремар) is a partner of Karabas Barabas who catches leeches for a living and so disturbs Tortilla's pond.
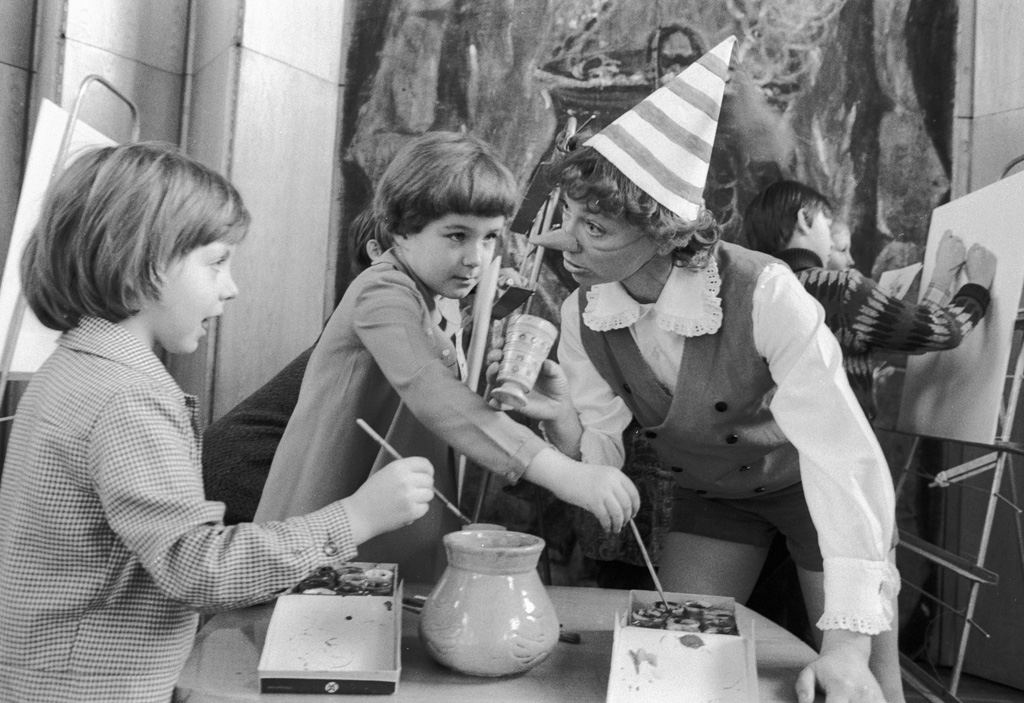
Children at the "Children with Buratino" festival in Moscow, USSR (1983)

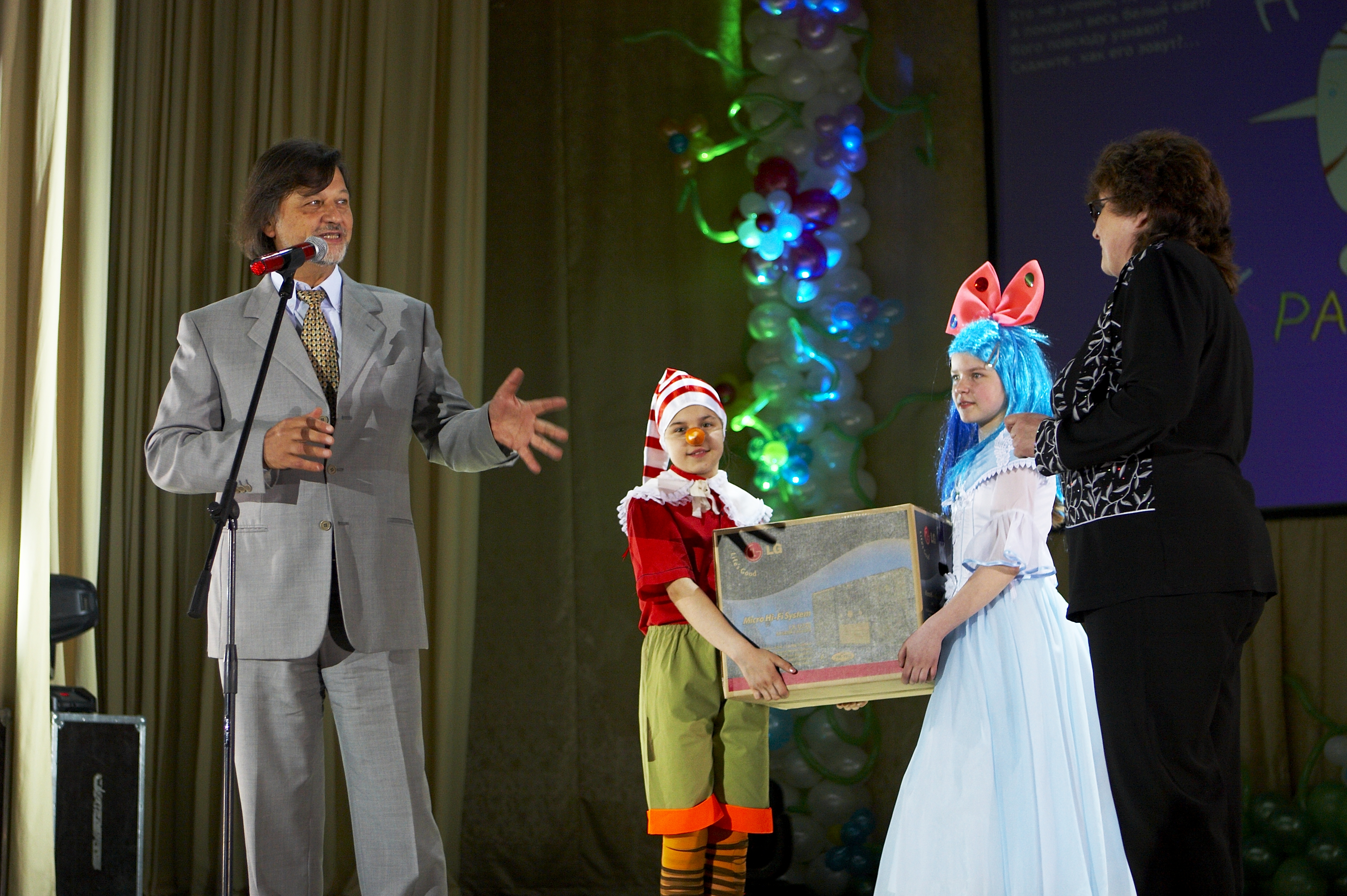
Buratino meeting in Kazan, Russia (2007)

== Adaptations ==
=== Films ===
==== Live-action ====
- The Golden Key is a 1939 movie combining live action and stop-motion animation.
- The Adventures of Buratino is a 1975 live-action TV film in two parts, directed by Leonid Nechayev.
- Buratino, Son of Pinocchio is a 2009 Russian-Estonian film directed by Rasmus Merivoo.
- Buratino is a 2025 musical fantasy film directed by Igor Voloshin, will be a remake of the cult 1975 Soviet film The Adventures of Buratino.
- Buratino 2 (TBA)
- Buratino 3 (TBA)

==== Animation ====
- The Adventures of Buratino is a 1959 animated feature film by Soyuzmultfilm.
- The Return of Buratino (ru) is a 2013 animated film directed by Ekaterina Mikhailova.

=== Theater ===
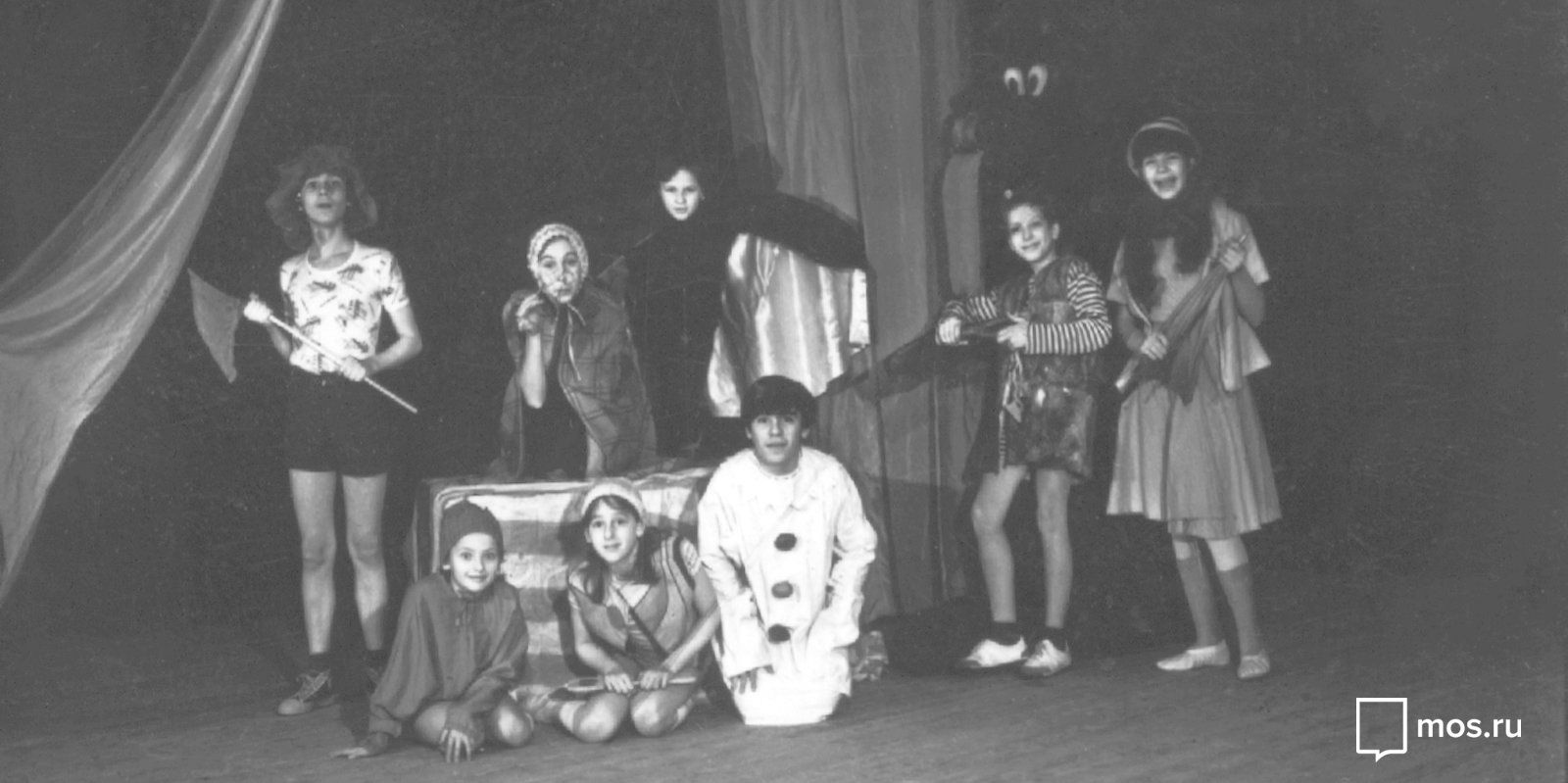
A scene from the play "Buratino" by the Young Muscovites Theater of the Moscow City Palace of Pioneers and Schoolchildren, February 1983

- Aranykulcsocska, avagy Burattino kalandjai, a 2020 chamber opera composition by Mester Dávid.

=== Video games ===
- The computer game The Adventures of Buratino was released in 1993, the first graphic adventure computer game released in the post-Soviet Russia.

== Monuments and art works dedicated to Buratino ==
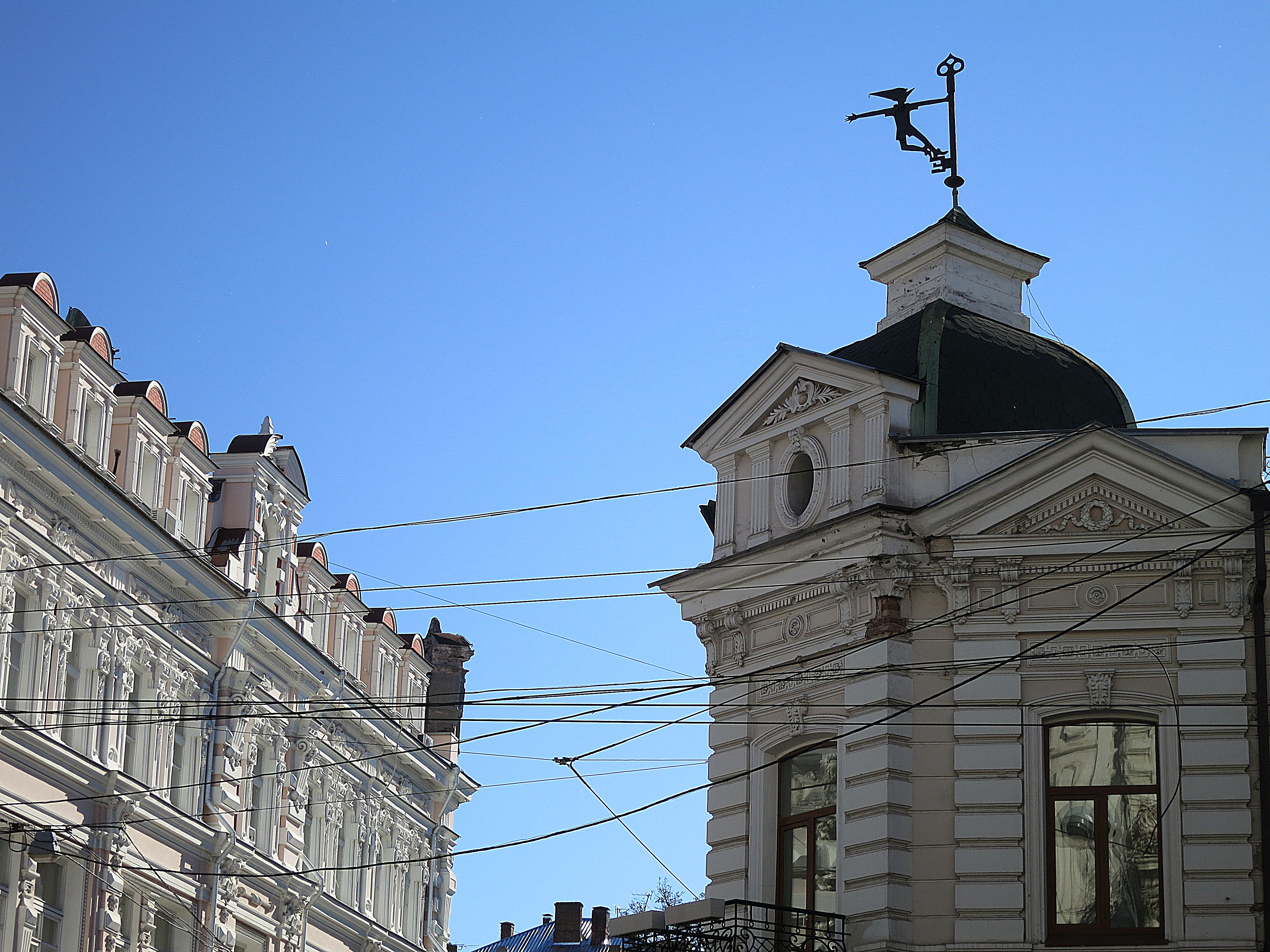
The Gench-Ogluev House in Rostov-on-Don (2014)

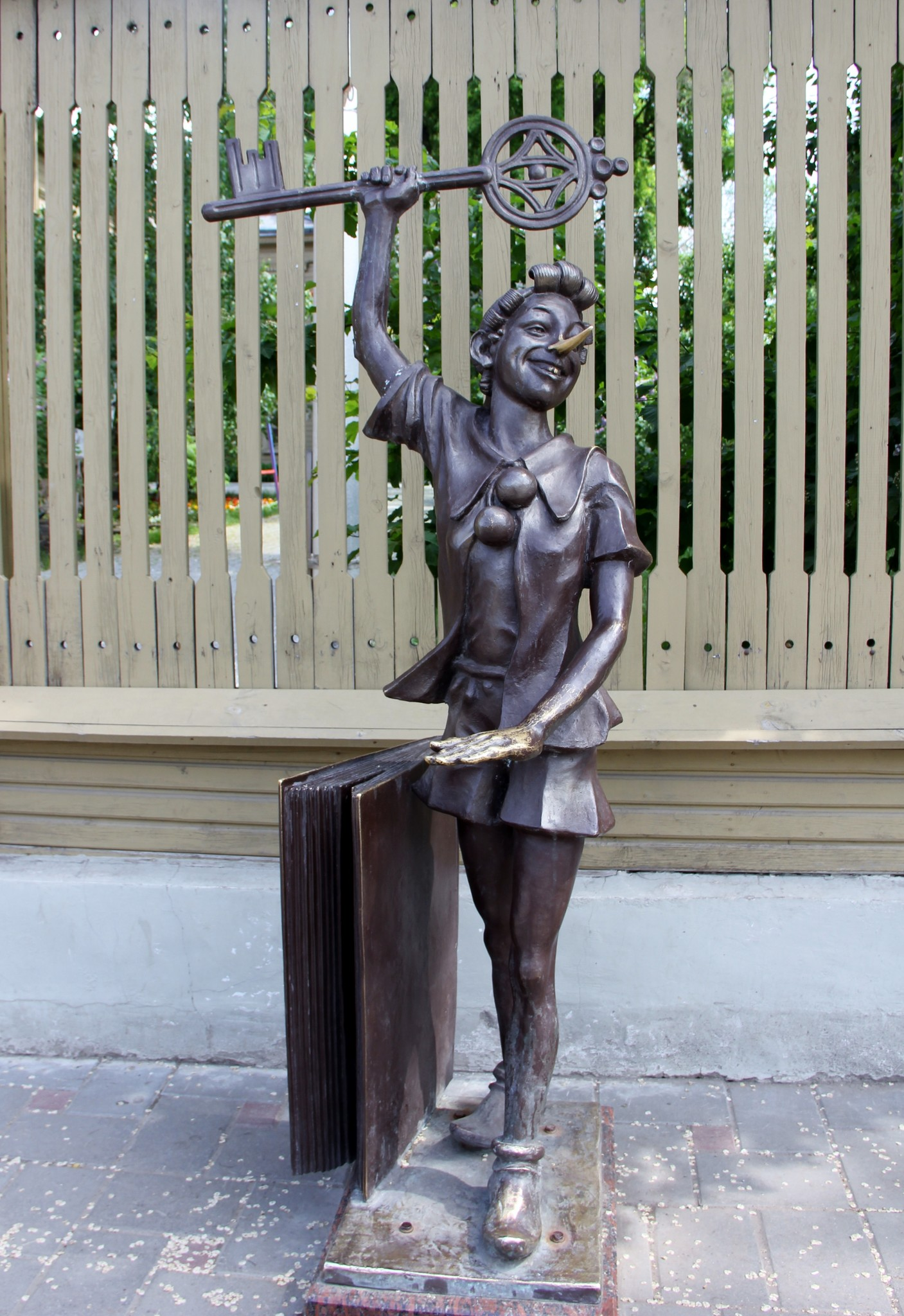
A monument to Buratino has appeared in Samara (2016)
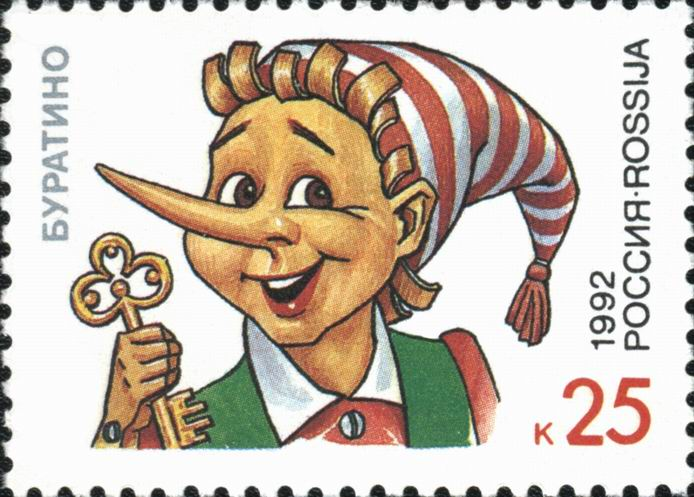
A 1992 Russian postage stamp depicting Buratino

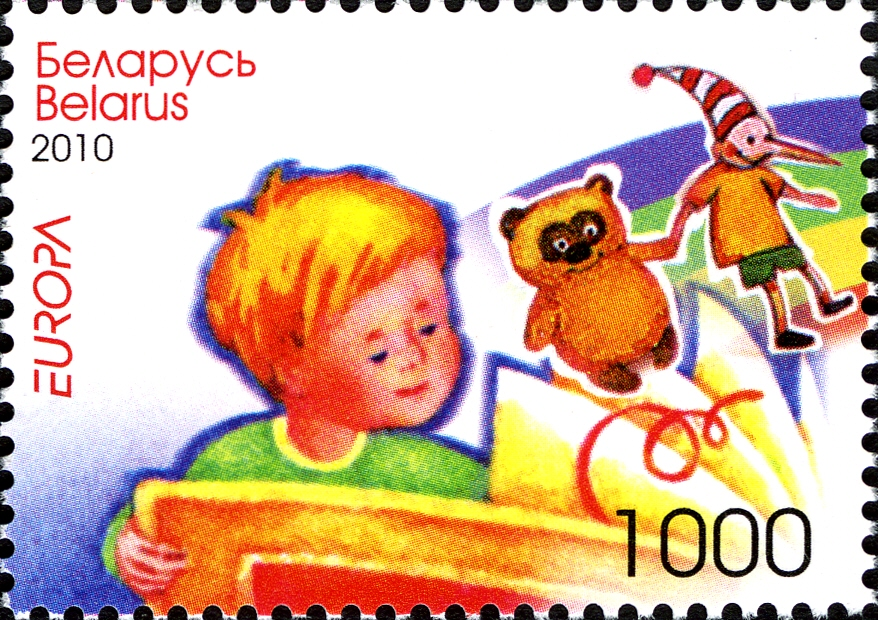
A 2010 Belarusian stamp

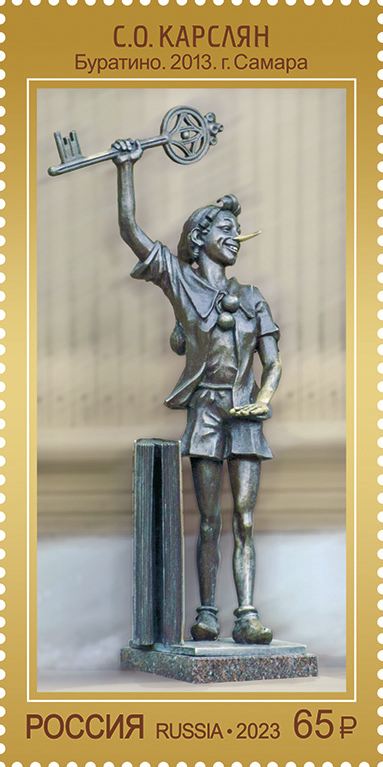
A 2023 Russian postage stamp depicting a statue of Buratino in Samara.
