= The Adventures of Buratino (video game) =

Russian adventure game released in 1993

- Developer: Copper Feet
- Publisher: Compact-Studio
- Designers: Vyacheslav Mednonogov, Alexey Mednonogov
- Composer: Alexey Mednonogov
- Platform: Spectrum 48k/128k
- Release: 1993
- Genre: adventure
- Mode: Single-player

The Adventures of Buratino (Russian: Приключения Буратино) is a 1993 arcade adventure game created by Russian developer Copper Feet and published by Compact-Studio. It was available on the ZX Spectrum 48K/128K, and was the first arcade adventure game released in Russia after the fall of the Soviet Union.

The game is based on the story of the novel The Golden Key, or The Adventures of Buratino by famed Russian writer Aleksey Tolstoy, itself based on The Adventures of Pinocchio by Carlo Collodi. Themes of these stories are incorporated into the game, where the main character, Burantino, is a wooden boy who was cut from a log by an old organ grinder named Carlo.

In terms of gameplay, the Russian gaming magazine Romomania says "the player will encounter an interesting labyrinth, a fascinating plot, a small set of quest items, some Russian text and an arcade chase in the finale." It also describes the music, written by Alexey Mednonogov, as simple but decent and including sound similar to that of a hurdy-gurdy. The graphics are impressive for the Spectrum, and the game is in full color.
