= Burattino =

Commedia dell'arte character

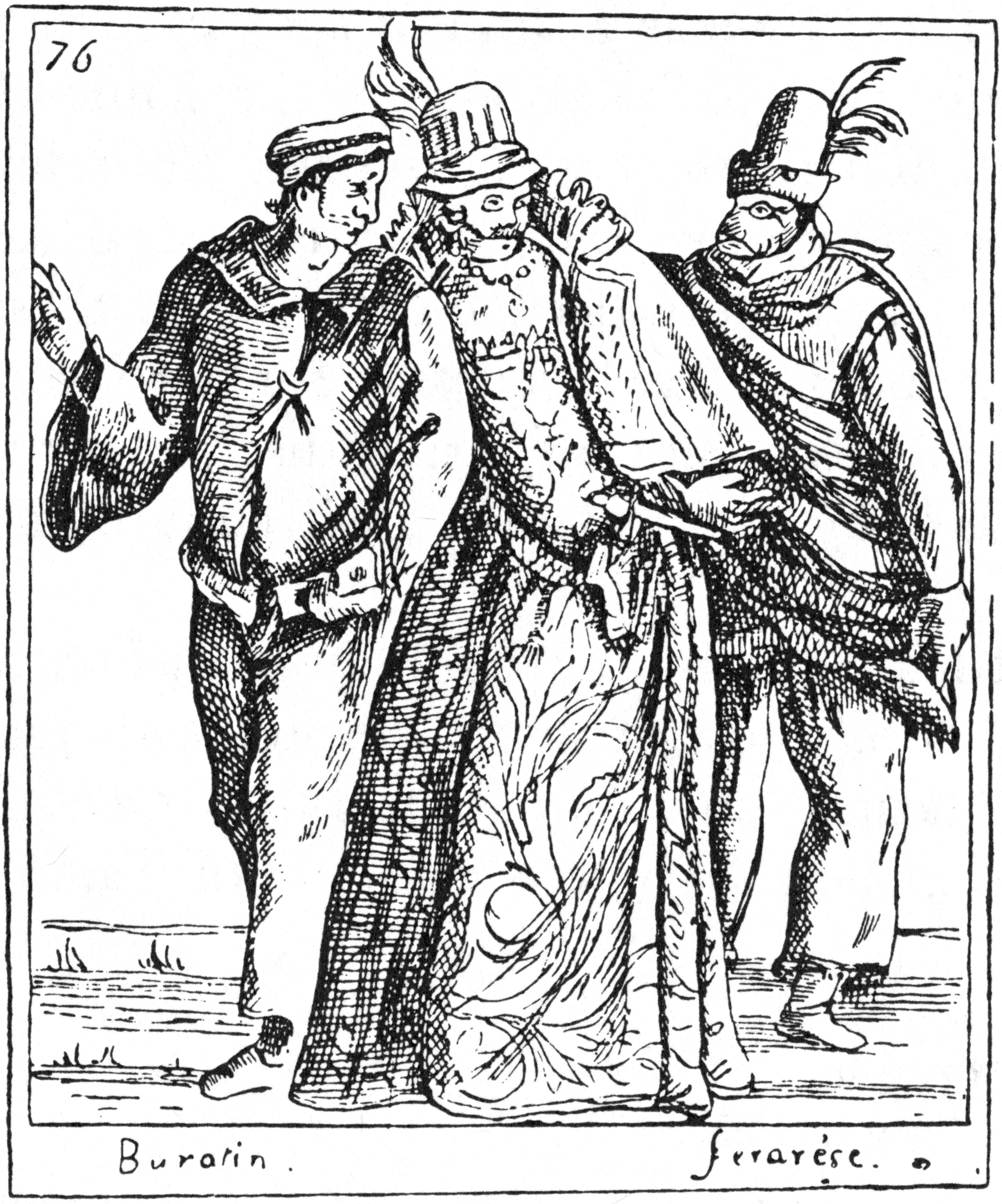
A Courtesan and Burattino, 1594 engraving from Duchartre, p. 271

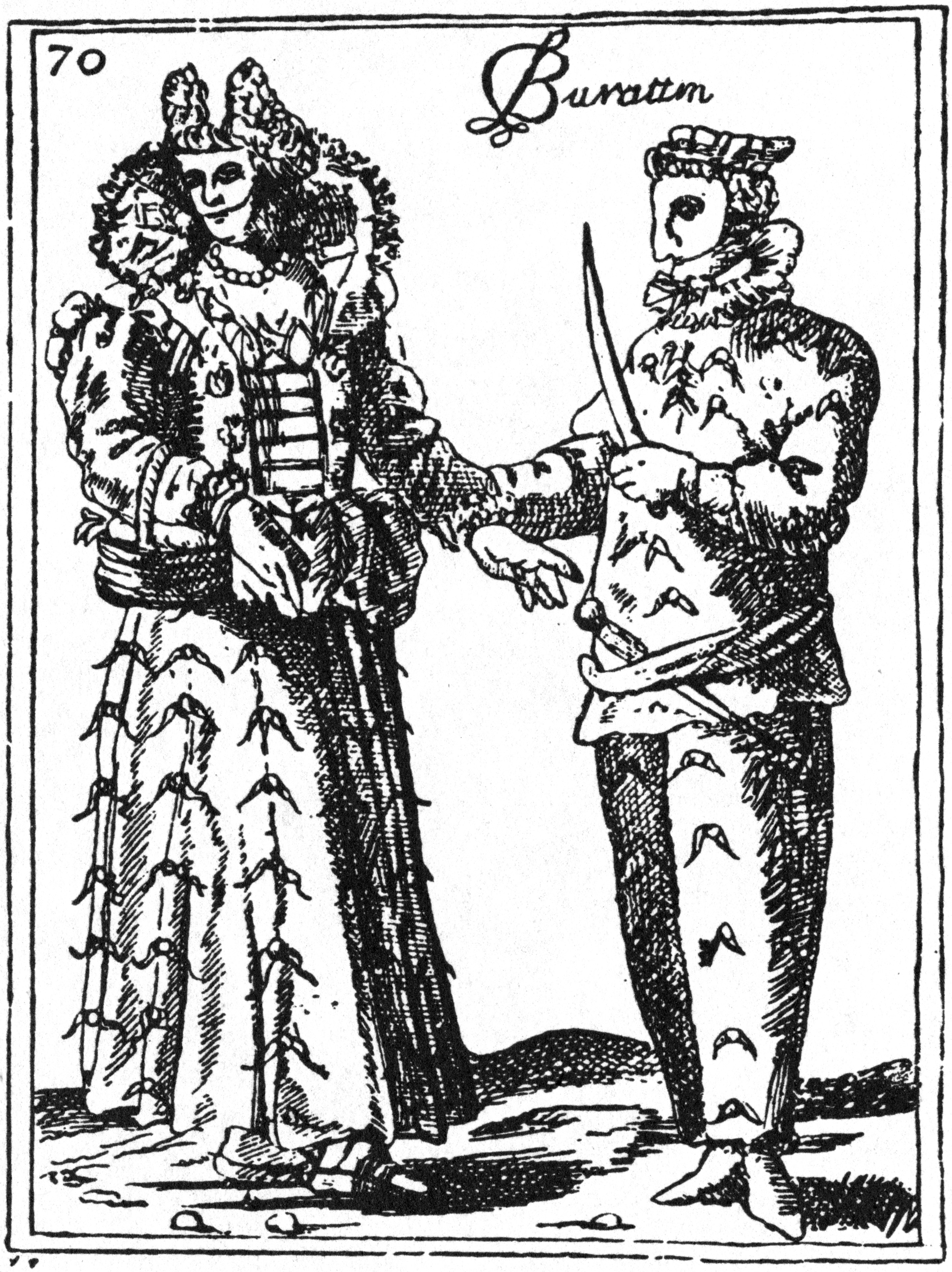
Burattino, 1594 engraving from Duchartre, p. 301

Burattino, also Burrattino or Burratino, is a minor commedia dell'arte character of the Zanni (or second Zanni) class.

== Name ==
In Italian burattino means "puppet", although it is not clear whether the commedia dell'arte character was called Burattino because he moved like a puppet or puppets acquired the name because of Burattino. Though only mildly popular on the stage, he found his real fame in the marionette theater. According to Pierre-Louis Duchartre, the puppet named Burattino became so popular in Italy, that "by the end of the sixteenth century, all marionettes operated by strings and a wire were called burattini, instead of bagatelli or fantoccini, as they had been known up to that time." Today, the Italian word burattino can also refer to a hand puppet.

Duchartre also reproduces two illustrations from 1594 with Burattino, in which he wears a costume similar to Zani's but with a characteristic flat round hat. Tommaso Garzoni (1549–1589) associates the character with a small cap called a berettino. Richard Andrews suggests the two words may be related. The word berettino has also been used to refer to the ecclesiastical skullcap, more commonly known as the zucchetto.

== Character ==
Burattino is one of three commedia dell'arte masks mentioned by Bartolomeo Rossi in the foreword to his 1584 comic pastoral play Fiammella, as examples of low-life characters who speak the Bergamasque dialect (usually approximate), the other two being Pedrolino and Arlecchino. As a rustic dialect, it signaled the character's low social status and was used in Italian theatre into the 18th century.

Burattino is in 21 of the 50 scenarios of Flaminio Scala, published in 1611. He appears as a house servant, an innkeeper, a gardener, a peasant, a beggar, and a long-lost father. Like Pedrolino, Burrattino is extremely good natured. He is so trustworthy that, in the third of Scala's scenarios, "The Fortunate Isabella", the lone innamorata Isabella takes him along as her sole accompaniment on a journey across the country. When he later in the play believes (mistakenly) that Isabella has been kidnapped and raped, he weeps and laments at length. Buratino is the protagonist of Alexei Tolstoy's novel The Golden Key, or The Adventures of Buratino, which was inspired by The Adventures of Pinocchio, a literary fairy tale written by the Italian author Carlo Collodi. The two characters share many similarities.

== Bibliography ==
- Andrews, Richard (2008). The Commedia dell'Arte of Flamino Scala: A Translation and Analysis of 30 Scenarios. Lanham, Maryland: The Scarecrow Press. ISBN 9780810862074.
- Duchartre, Pierre-Louis (1929; Dover reprint 1966). The Italian Comedy, translated by Randolph T. Weaver. London: George G. Harrap and Co., Ltd. (1929); New York: Dover (1966). ISBN 0486216799.
- Garzoni, Tommaso (1589; Olschki reprint 1996). La Piazza Universale di tutte le professioni del mondo, edited by Giovanni Battista Bronzini. Florence: Olschki. ISBN 9788822243966.
- Rossi, Bartolomeo (1584). Fiammella pastorale. Paris: Abel L'Angelier. Copy at Google Books.
- Rudlin, John (1994). Commedia dell’Arte, An actor’s handbook. London: Routledge. ISBN 9780415047708.
- Scala, Flaminio; Salerno, Henry F., translator (1967). Scenarios of the Commedia dell'Arte: Flaminio Scala's Il Teatro delle Favole Rappresentative, foreword by Kenneth McKee. New York: New York University Press. OCLC 186077.
