= Michał Bylina =

Polish painter (1904–1982)

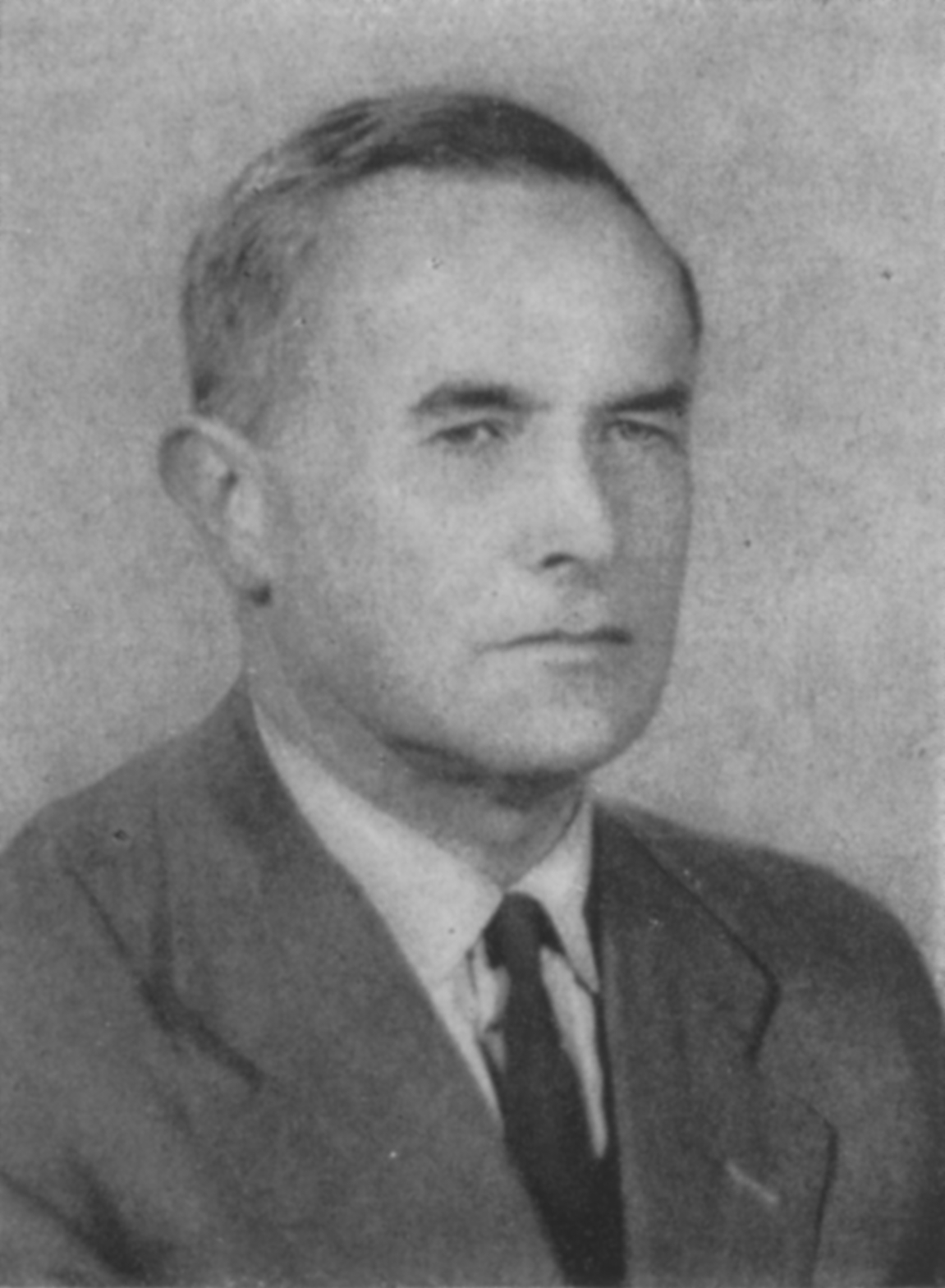
- Michał Bylina
- Born: 18 January 1904; Warsówka, Russian Empire
- Died: 5 August 1982 (aged 78); Warsaw, Poland
- Occupation: Painter

Michał Bylina (18 January 1904 – 5 August 1982) was a Polish painter. His work was part of the art competitions at the 1932 Summer Olympics and the 1936 Summer Olympics.
