= Kharkov Trial =

1943 war crimes trial

- Court: Soviet military tribunal Kharkov, Soviet Union
- Indictment: War crimes Treason
- Decided: 18 December 1943

Case history
- Related action: Moscow Declarations

The Kharkov Trial was a war crimes trial held in front of a Soviet military tribunal in December 1943 in Kharkov, Soviet Union. Defendants included one Soviet collaborator, as well as German military, police, and SS personnel responsible for implementing the occupational policies during the German–Soviet War of 1941–45. The trial was the first time that German personnel had been tried for war crimes by the Allies during and after World War II.

== Background ==
Units of the German Wehrmacht first occupied Kharkov on 23–24 October 1941. German forces, including the Einsatzgruppen (mobile death squads), killed tens of thousands of Jews, as well as Communists, Soviet prisoners of war, and other "undesirables". Shooting, hanging, and gas vans were used. Fifteen thousand Jews were murdered on 15 December 1941 in a mass shooting in Drobytsky Yar. The Gestapo also shot 435 patients, many of whom were elderly people and children, who were being treated at the local hospital. In March 1943, 800 wounded Red Army soldiers were shot and burned alive. Overall, the Soviets said that in the Kharkov region, the "German-fascist invaders had shot, hanged, burned alive, and poisoned by carbon monoxide gas more than 30,000 peaceful completely innocent citizens, including women, old people, and children."

The city was temporarily retaken by the Red Army in February 1943 and then by the Wehrmacht in April 1943. Already in the spring of 1943 Soviet authorities discovered mass graves of the victims, mostly Jews. By the time that Kharkov was liberated for good in August 1943, virtually no Jews survived in the city.

== Proceedings ==
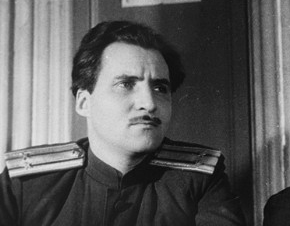
Konstantin Simonov served as a war correspondent during the trial.

The tribunal heard the case against four defendants: Soviet collaborator Mikhail Bulanov, 26, and three Germans, Wilhelm Langheld, 52, Reinhard Retzlaff, 36, and Hans Ritz, 24, members of the Wehrmacht, police, and SS forces, respectively. They were charged both under the Soviet and international law, the Moscow Declarations. All four were accused of participating in the murders of Soviet citizens, and Bulanov was also charged with treason for collaborating with the Germans. Prosecutors, defence counsel, and judges were military. A six-person forensic team provided expert testimony and a report concluding that the manner of killings was consistent with shootings and the use of gas.

All four men pleaded guilty, admitting to the crimes and describing them in detail, including the use of the gas vans, mass shootings, and murder of women and children, encouraged and rewarded by their superiors. Langheld admitted to personally killing approximately 100 Soviet citizens. Defence counsel's strategy amounted to arguing that the accused were following orders. The prosecution acknowledged that the men were indeed acting on superior orders, but rejected this as a sufficient defence, using the decision of the Leipzig War Crimes Trials as a precedent. The trial concluded on 18 December 1943 with guilty verdicts and death sentences.

The findings of the court:

- Wilhelm Langheld personally fabricated a number of cases in which about 100 innocent Soviet war prisoners and civilians were shot.
- Hans Ritz directed the shootings carried out by the S.D. Sonderkommando in Taganrog, and during the examination of prisoners beat them up with ramrods and rubber truncheons, thus trying to extort from them false statements.
- Reinhard Retzlaff tried to extort from Soviet civilians false statements by means of torture—plucking out their hair and torturing them with needles, drew up fictitious reports in the case of 28 arrested Soviet citizens. He personally drove into the "murder van" Soviet citizens doomed to death, accompanied the "murder van" to the place of unloading and took part in the burning of bodies of asphyxiated people.
- Mikhail Petrovich Bulanov, having betrayed the Socialist motherland, voluntarily sided with the enemy, joined the German service as a chauffeur with the Kharkov Gestapo branch, personally took part in the extermination of Soviet citizens by means of the "murder van", drove Soviet citizens to the shootings, and took part in the shooting of sixty children.

The defendants were all hanged in the public square of Kharkov the next day. The proceedings were published in English for an international audience.
