= The Road to Calvary =

Trilogy of novels by Aleksey Nikolayevich Tolstoy

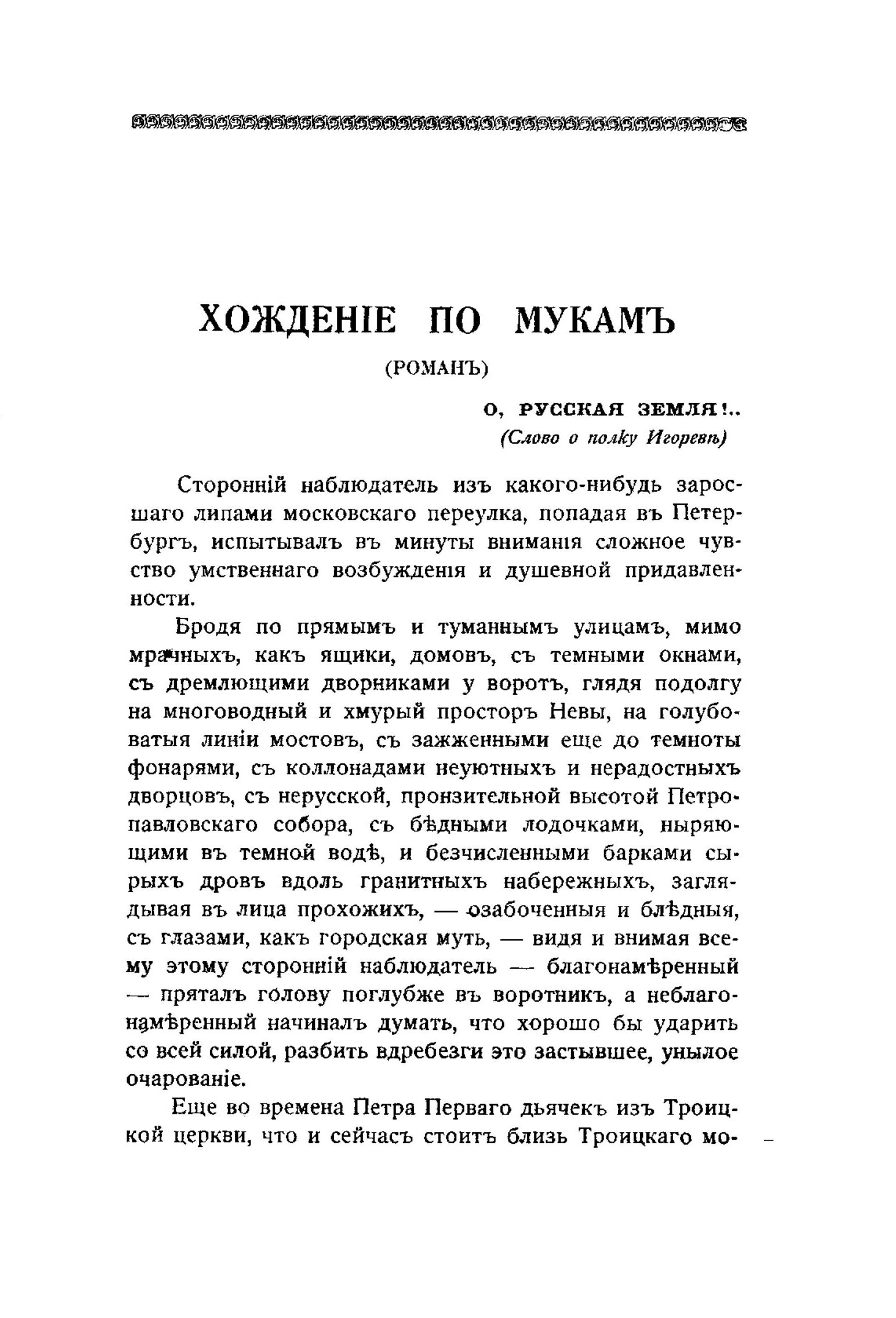
- Publication of Sisters In Russian émigré journal Gryadushchaya Rossiya (1920)
- Author: Aleksey Nikolayevich Tolstoy
- Original title: Хождение по мукам
- Language: Russian
- Genre: Socialist realism, epic novel
- Publication place: France (Sisters, 1918–1920), Soviet Union (1922–1941)

The Road to Calvary (Russian: Хождение по мукам, romanized: Khozhdeniye po mukam, lit. 'Walking Through Torments'), also translated as Ordeal, is a trilogy of novels by Aleksey Nikolayevich Tolstoy, tracing the fate of the Russian intelligentsia on the eve of, during, and after the revolution of 1917. It consists of the novels Sisters (1918–1922; «Сёстры»), The Eighteenth Year (1927–1928; «Восемнадцатый год») and Gloomy Morning (1940–1941; «Хмурое утро»). The first part was written for the émigré readers, while the rest was written as a work of Socialist realism.

== Background ==
Walking Through Torments is the walking of the author's conscience of suffering, hopes, enthusiasm, falls, despondency, take-offs - a feeling of a whole huge era.

— A. Tolstoy

The first part, Sisters, was written from 1918 to 1920, during the author's emigration, while the rest he wrote after his return to Soviet Russia. The novel Sisters was published in the White émigré journals Gryadushchaya Rossiya and Sovremennye zapiski under the title Walking Through Torments. In 1941, after the start of the Great Patriotic War, Tolstoy reworked the 2 first parts and wrote the third one as works of socrealism.

== Plot ==
In the first chapters of the epic, St. Petersburg is shown in the beginning of 1914. Sisters Daria (Dasha) Bulavin and Ekaterina (Katya) Bulavin, originally from Samara, are carried away by the poet-decadent Aleksei Bessonov. Katya is married to Nikolai Smokovnikov, a lawyer, and has an illicit affair behind his back.

Over time, Ekaterina falls in love with officer Vadim Petrovich Roshchin, and Daria with Ivan Ilyich Telegin, an engineer at the Baltic plant. World War I, two revolutions and civil war carry the four main characters to different corners of the country. Their paths intersect more than once and again diverge. Roshchin joins the Volunteer Army, and Telegin joins the Red Army. At the end of the war, all four meet in the capital of Soviet Russia, where in the presence of Lenin and Stalin they enthusiastically listen to Gleb Krzhizhanovsky's historic report on the GOELRO plan.

== Awards ==
For his trilogy Alexey Tolstoy was awarded the Stalin Prize of the first degree in the amount of 100,000 rubles on March 19, 1943, which he transferred to the Defense Fund for the construction of the tank "Grozny" (T-34 No. 310-0929).

== Adaptations ==
- The Road to Calvary — Soviet three-part feature film (1957-1959)
  - Sisters (1957)
  - The Eighteenth Year (1958)
  - Gloomy Morning (1959)
- The Road to Calvary — Soviet 13-episode miniseries (1977)
- The Road to Calvary — Russian 12-episode miniseries (2017)
