= The Adventures of Buratino (1959 film) =

1959 film

- 1979 Italian theatrical re-release poster
- Directed by: Dmitriy Babichenko; Ivan Ivanov-Vano
- Written by: Nikolai Erdman; Lyudmila Tolstaya
- Produced by: Ivan Ivanov-Vano
- Starring: Nina Gulyayeva; Yevgeny Vesnik; Georgy Vitsin; Tamara Dmitrieva; Margarita Korabelnikova; Aleksandr Baranov; Yelena Ponsova; Vladimir Lepko
- Edited by: Nina Mayorova
- Music by: Anatoly Lepin
- Production company: Soyuzmultfilm
- Release date: December 31, 1959 (USSR)
- Running time: 67 minutes
- Country: Soviet Union
- Language: Russian

The Adventures of Buratino (Russian: Приключе́ния Бурати́но; tr.:Priklyucheniya Buratino) is a 1959 Soviet traditionally animated feature film directed by the "patriarch of Russian animation", Ivan Ivanov-Vano, along with Dmitriy Babichenko and Mikhail Botov. It was produced at the Soyuzmultfilm studio in Moscow and is based on Aleksey Nikolayevich Tolstoy’s The Golden Key, or Adventures of Buratino.

The film tells about the adventures of a small wooden puppet whose youngest viewers are familiar with the book where Carlo Collodi tells the adventures of Pinocchio. In fact, Burattino is a puppet in the first version of the novel.

== Plot ==
A penniless former organ grinder named Papa Carlo receives a mysterious talking log from his neighbor, a carpenter nicknamed Giuseppe “The Blue Nose.” Carlo carves the log into a puppet, naming his new creation Buratino. With dreams of sending Buratino to school, Carlo sells his coat to buy him an alphabet book. However, Buratino’s mischievous nature leads him astray when he sells the book to buy a ticket to a puppet show. At the theater, Buratino interrupts a performance, earning the ire of the sinister director, Karabas Barabas, who initially threatens to burn him but later gives him five gold coins. The coins attract the attention of two cunning con artists, the Fox Alice and Cat Basilio, who deceive Buratino with promises of magical riches, setting him on a perilous adventure.

Buratino narrowly escapes their schemes with help from various allies, including the kind-hearted Malvina and her poodle Artemon. Along the way, Buratino learns of a golden key from the wise turtle Tortila, who explains that it unlocks a mysterious door connected to his destiny. Meanwhile, Karabas Barabas relentlessly pursues Buratino to reclaim the key, hoping to protect a secret tied to his power. As Buratino unites with Malvina, Artemon, and their allies, they outwit the villains in a series of daring encounters, eventually uncovering the key’s purpose: it opens a hidden door in Papa Carlo's home, leading to a magical theater.

In the climactic scenes, Buratino and his friends defeat Karabas Barabas and his accomplices, reclaiming their freedom and creating a new life in the theater under Papa Carlo's direction. The story concludes with Karabas Barabas, defeated and humiliated, unable to gain entry to the grand opening of the new theater. Meanwhile, Buratino, Carlo, and their friends celebrate a bright future filled with creativity and camaraderie, leaving behind the shadows of greed and deceit.

== Dubs ==
In 1984, an English dub of the film was recorded at Jim Terry Productions (the same people behind the first English dub of the Pinocchio anime). This dub was released on subsequent VHS tapes throughout the 80s and early 90s. A second attempt at an English dub commenced in 1990, and a third in 1995 by Films by Jove for the series Stories from My Childhood.

In 2005, a Spanish dub of the film was published by East West DVD Entertainment under the title Las nuevas aventuras de Pinocchio. It is unknown whether this dub is a direct translation of the Russian film; since East West was an American entity, it is likely that their dub is instead a translation of one of the English versions.

== DVD releases ==
- Films by Jove, May 18, 1999 (R1?, NTSC) - version restored by Films by Jove in the 1990s. Titled Stories from My Childhood, Vol. 2. It contains English, French and Spanish soundtracks, no subtitles. Included films: Ivan and His Magic Pony (aka. The Humpbacked Horse), Pinocchio and the Golden Key (aka. The Adventures of Buratino).
- Krupnyy Plan, 2002 (R5, PAL) - version restored by Krupnyy Plan ("full restoration of image and sound"). It contains an original Russian soundtrack with no subtitles. Included film: The Adventures of Buratino. Other features: Before and after restoration, photo album, director filmographies.
- Films by Jove, 2006 (R0?, NTSC) - version restored by Films by Jove in the 1990s. It contains a Russian soundtrack with English subtitles. Included films: The Adventures of Buratino, The Boy from Neapolis (Мальчик из Неаполя), Chipollino (Чиполино).

== Creators ==
	English	Russian
Director-producers	Dmitriy Babichenko; Ivan Ivanov-Vano	Дмитрий Бабиченко; Иван Иванов-Вано
Director	Mikhail Botov	Михаил Ботов
Scenario	Nikolai Erdman; Lyudmila Tolstaya	Николай Эрдман; Людмила Толстая
Art Directors	Svetozar Rusakov; Pyotr Repkin	Светозар Русаков; Пётр Репкин
Artists	D. Anpilov; K. Malyshev; O. Gemmerling; G. Nevzorova; Protr Korobayev; I. Kuskova	Д. Анпилов; К. Малышев; О. Геммерлинг; Г. Невзорова; Пётр Коробаев; И. Кускова
Animators	Faina Yepifanova; Vadim Dolgikh; Fyodor Khitruk; Boris Butakov; Kirill Malyantovich; Igor Podgorskiy; Vladimir Pekar; Vladimir Popov; Konstantin Chikin; Vladimir Krumin; Yelena Khludova; Valentin Karavayev	Фаина Епифанова; Вадим Долгих; Фёдор Хитрук; Борис Бутаков; Кирилл Малянтович; Игорь Подгорский; Владимир Пекарь; Владимир Попов; Константин Чикин; Владимир Крумин; Елена Хлудова; Валентин Караваев
Camera Operator	Mikhail Druyan	Михаил Друян
Composer	Anatoly Lepin	Анатолий Лепин
Sound Operator	Georgy Martynyuk	Георгий Мартынюк
Script Editor	Raisa Frichinskaya	Раиса Фричинская
Editor	Nina Mayorova	Нина Майорова
Voice actors	Nina Gulyayeva; Yevgeny Vesnik; Georgy Vitsin; Tamara Dmitrieva; Margarita Korabelnikova; Aleksandr Baranov; Yelena Ponsova; Vladimir Lepko; Tatiana Strukova; Yulia Yulskaya; Vladimir Ratomsky; Maria Vinogradova; Leonid Pirogov; Erast Garin; Sergey Martinson; Anastasia Zuyeva; Yuri Khrzhanovsky; Grigory Shpigel	Нина Гуляева; Евгений Весник; Георгий Вицин; Тамара Дмитриева; Маргарита Корабельникова; Александр Баранов; Елена Понсова; Владимир Лепко; Татьяна Струкова; Юлия Юльская; Владимир Ратомский; Мария Виноградова; Леонид Пирогов; Эраст Гарин; Сергей Мартинсон; Анастасия Зуева; Юрий Хржановский; Григорий Шпигель
English Dub Voice actors	Joseph Mazzello as Buratino; Bill Murray as Basilio; Mel Ferrer as Papa Carlo	Джозеф Маццелло; Билл Мюррей; Мел Феррер

== Awards ==
- Minsk, 1960 - First prize in the animated film category

== See also ==
- History of Russian animation
- List of animated feature-length films
