= Aleksey Nikolayevich Tolstoy =

Russian and Soviet writer (1883–1945)

Aleksey Tolstoy
- Алексей Толстой
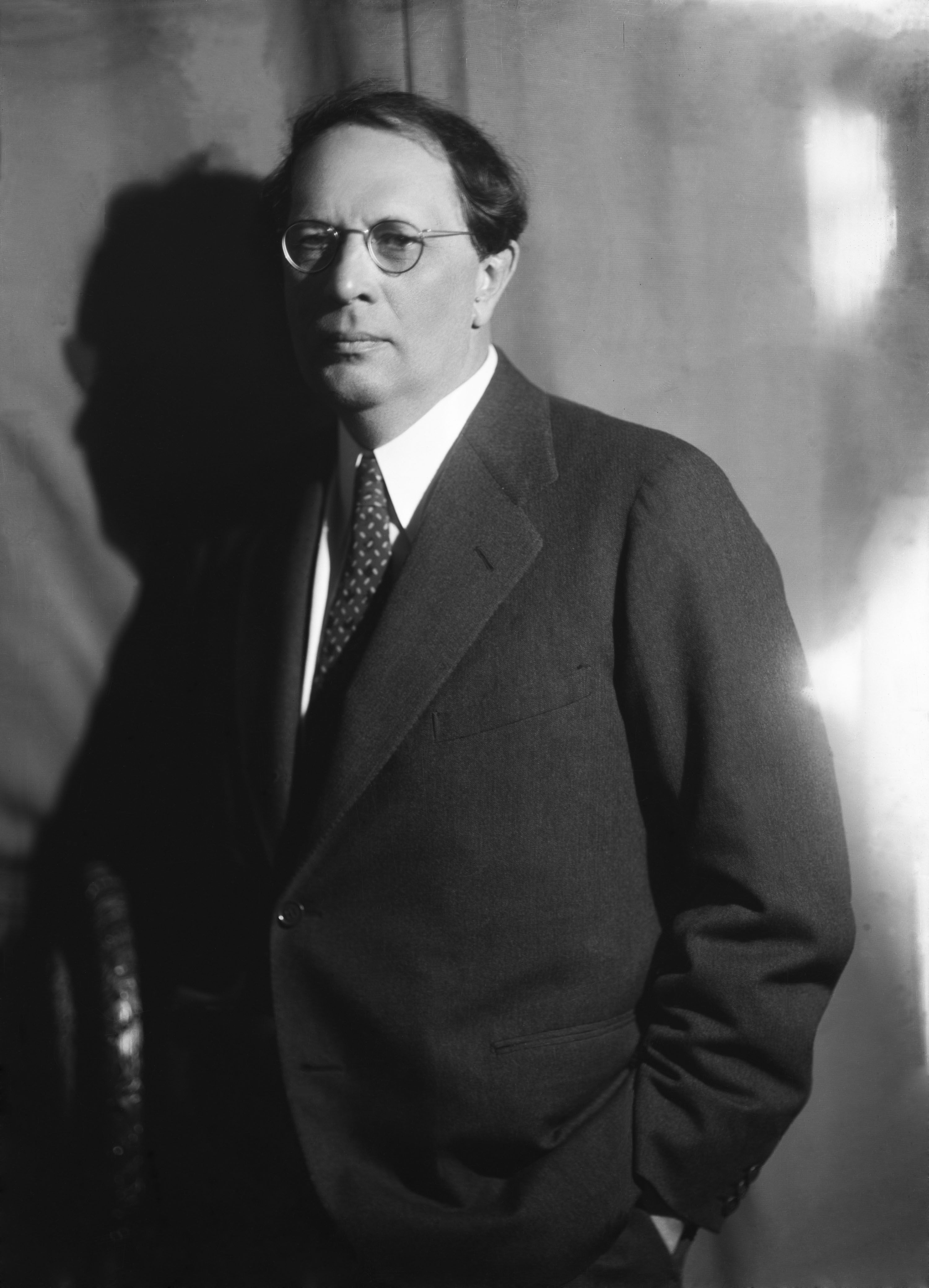
- Born: 10 January 1883; Nikolayevsk, Samara Governorate, Russian Empire
- Died: 23 February 1945 (aged 62); Moscow, Russian SFSR, Soviet Union
- Occupations: Novelist; poet; journalist; writer
- Spouse: J. Rožanska
- Writing career
- Period: 1907–1945
- Genres: Science fiction; historical fiction

Aleksey Nikolayevich Tolstoy (Russian: Алексей Николаевич Толстой; 10 January 1883 [O.S. 29 December 1882] – 23 February 1945) was a Russian and Soviet writer whose works span across many genres, but mainly belonged to science fiction and historical fiction.

Despite having initially opposed the Bolshevik Revolution in 1917, he was able to return to Russia six years later and live a privileged life as a highly paid author, reputedly a millionaire, who adapted his writings to conform to the line laid down by the All-Union Communist Party (Bolsheviks).

== Life and career ==
=== Parentage ===
Tolstoy's mother Alexandra Leontievna Turgeneva (1854–1906) was a grand-niece of Nikolay Turgenev, who had been a Decembrist, and a relative of the Russian writer Ivan Turgenev. She married Count Nikolay Alexandrovich Tolstoy (1849–1900), a member of the aristocratic Tolstoy family and a distant relative of Leo Tolstoy.

Aleksey claimed that Count Tolstoy was his biological father, which allowed him to style himself as a Count; since his mother had taken a lover and left her husband before he was born, not all of his contemporaries believed him. The Nobel Prize winning author Ivan Bunin, who knew him as a young man, wrote in his diary, on 23 February 1953: "Aldanov said that Alyosha Tolstoy himself told him that he, T., bore the surname Bostrom until the age of 16 and then went to see his imaginary father, Count Nick Tolstoy, and begged to legitimize him." According to author and historian Nikolai Tolstoy, a distant relative:

His father had been a rake-hell cavalry officer, whose rowdy excesses proved too much even for his fellow hussars. He was obliged to leave his regiment and the two capital cities, and retired to an estate in Samara, Russia. There he met and married Alexandra Leontievna Turgenev, a lively girl of good family, but slender means. They had two sons, Alexander and Mstislav, and a daughter Elizabeth. But the wild blood of the Tolstoys did not allow him to settle down to an existing domestic harmony. Within a year the retired hussar had been exiled to Kostroma for insulting the Governor of Samara. When strings were eventually pulled to arrange his return, he celebrated it by provoking a fellow-noble to a duel. Alexandra fell in love with Alexei Appollonovich Bostrom. In May 1882, already two months pregnant with her fourth child, she fled into the arms of her lover. The Count threatened Bostrom with a revolver but was exculpated by the courts. The ecclesiastical court, in granting a divorce, ruled that the guilty wife should never be allowed to remarry. In order to keep the expected baby, Alexandra was compelled to assert that it was Bostrom's child.

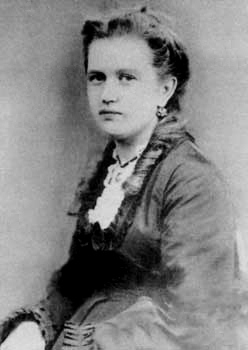
Alexandra Leontyevna Tolstaya, Aleksey's mother

What is known is that Bostrom brought the boy up as his own child, on his family farm in Samara province, and that he was known in his childhood and in his teens as Aleksey Bostrom. When he was 13, his mother began a lawsuit to have him recognized as the son of Count Tolstoy, which eventually he was on his 17th birthday, after which he was entitled to style himself as Count Tolstoy.

=== Early life ===
Tolstoy's adoptive father was a liberal landowner, who had supported the emancipation of Russian serfs in the 1860s. His mother wrote children's stories, using the pseudonym Alexander Bostrom. Due in part to their rejection by both the Russian nobility and the Russian Church, Aleksey grew up in a staunchly atheistic and anti-monarchist environment, and was encouraged to be creative. He was home taught by his parents, and by a visiting tutor, until the age of 14, when the family moved to Samara, after selling their farm, and he was enrolled in a local school.

=== St. Petersburg ===
Count Nikolai Tolstoy died in 1900, leaving a will from which Aleksey received 30,000 rubles. This allowed him to move to St Petersburg, where he studied at the Technological Institute St Petersburg in 1901–1906. In June 1902, he married a fellow student, Julia Rozhansky, the daughter of a provincial doctor. Their son, Yuri, was born in 1903. According to Nikolai Tolstoy, he took part in a student protest on 12 February 1902 along Nevsky Prospekt, which was broken up by police and Cossacks, and joined the Social Democratic Party, but there does not appear to be any corroboration for this account of his student radicalism. He avoided becoming involved in the 1905 Revolution, by moving to Dresden in February 1906, to enrol in the Royal Saxon Higher School after the government temporarily closed the Technological Institute.

In Dresden, he met Sofia Dymshitz (1889–1963), who had recently married another emigre student named Isaac Rosenfeld (1879-1978). She and Tolstoy became lovers, and returned to rent a shared apartment in St. Petersburg, where she took up painting. Her sister in law, Bella Rosenfeld, married Marc Chagall. Tolstoy's wife agreed to a divorce, which was finalised in 1910, but Rosenfeld always refused to divorce Dymshitz.

=== Paris ===
In 1907, Tolstoy broke off his studies to dedicate himself to writing. The couple decided to emigrate in 1907, and arrived in Paris in January 1908, to join a wide network of emigré Russian writers and artists, including Nikolay Gumilyov, Valery Bryusov, Konstantin Balmont, Andrei Bely, Maximilian Voloshin. He and Gumilyov launched a periodical that folded after one issue for lack of funds. Tolstoy's first book of poems, Lyric, was published in 1907, at his own expense, but in later life he was embarrassed by it and preferred to forget it. His second poetry collection, Beyond the Blue Rivers (1908) was his last. In a letter to his adoptive father, he complained that the name Tolstoy meant that people had high expectations of him, though Voloshin suggested to him that it was an advantage. One young poet he met mistook him for Leo Tolstoy, who had died in 1910 aged 82.

In 1908, he learnt from his ex-wife that their son had died from meningitis. According to Nikolai Tolstoy,

Sophia claimed in a pious official memoir published in Moscow in 1973 that Alexey, 'took the child's death very much to heart.' One may question this. The father, after all, made no attempt to visit his ailing son before his lonely end, nor did he return for the funeral (though he did make another, business journey to Petersburg from Paris). As subsequent events were to show, he could evince extraordinary callousness toward individual members of the human race, whatever his broadly liberal viewpoint toward the species at large.

=== Return to Russia ===
Aleksey and Sophia returned to St. Petersburg in January 1909. By 1910, his success as a writer enabled them to move into a flat along Nevsky Prospekt, but because of her husband's refusal to grant a divorce, when she became pregnant, she returned to Paris in May 1911, where he joined her, so that he could be registered under French law as the father of their daughter, Marianna. They returned to St. Petersburg later in the year, but moved to Moscow in 1912.

In the summer of 1914 Tolstoy and Dymshitz took a vacation in Koktebel, Crimea, where he met a 17 year old ballerina named Margarita Kandaurova. Nikolai Tolstoy wrote in 1983: "The break with Sophia was as abrupt as it had been with Julia. Out on a stroll, Aleksey said significantly, 'I feel that this winter you're going to leave me.' Sophia did not reply, but took the hint and departed for another visit to Paris. The baby Mariana was deposited with an aunt."

Tolstoy hoped to marry Kandaurova, but she rejected him, and before the end of the year he had met his third wife, Natalya Volkenstein, née Krandinskaya, by whom he had three children.

During World War I Tolstoy worked as a war correspondent, visiting England and France, and wrote several essays and two plays.

=== Emigré ===
Tolstoy opposed the October Revolution. To escape living under Bolshevik rule, he moved with his family in 1918 to Odessa. Then, as the White Army was driven out of Crimea, they fled to Constantinople, before once more relocating to Paris. Unhappy at being, as he put it, "cut off from his homeland", in 1920, he wrote the story Nikita's Childhood, about growing up as an exile. Nikita was their oldest child, born in 1917, who was starting to speak with a French accent.

While living in France, Aleksey wrote several plays, and began writing a lengthy historical novel entitled, The Road to Calvary, which tracked the period from 1914 to 1919 including the Russian Civil War, which he had completed by 1921. Reaction to it in Soviet Russia was very hostile. The leading Bolshevik literary critic, Aleksandr Voronsky, editor of Krasnaya Nov described Tolstoy's depiction of the new regime as a "tendentious lie" full of "improbable banalities" and berated the writer for his "countish hatred, his lordly disdain, his spite, bitterness, fury."

By 1921, Tolstoy was bothered by the Gallicisms appearing in his son's spoken Russian language. Declaring that his son was becoming a foreigner, Aleksey moved the family to Berlin, which was then one of the main centers of the Russian diaspora. There, he wrote his science fiction novel, Aelita, and became associated with the 'Changing Landmarks' (Смена вех) group whose leading thinker was Nikolai Ustryalov, who were also known National Bolsheviks, because, despite their opposition to communism, they acknowledged that the Bolsheviks had united Russia. While there, he eventually began collaborating with Maxim Gorky on the pro-Soviet journal Nakanune. Ilya Ehrenburg later recalled:

There was a place in Berlin that reminded one of Noah's Ark, where the clean and unclean met peacefully; it was called the House of Arts and was just a common German café where Russian writers gathered on Fridays. Stories were read aloud by Tolstoy ... Apparently, not all the dice had been cast yet. There were people who called Gorky the 'semi emigre'... Alexey Tolstoy, surrounded by Smena Vekh (Changing Landmarks) people, alternately praised the Bolsheviks as, 'unifiers of the Russian land,' and indulged in angry abuse. The fog was still swirling.

=== Soviet dignitary ===
Tolstoy revisited Russia in May 1923, and decided to return permanently, having decided that "no literature will come out of the emigration". In his farewell editorial printed in Nakanune, he wrote, "I am leaving with my family for the homeland forever. If there are people here abroad close to me, my words are addressed to them. Do I go to happiness? Oh, no: Russia is going through hard times. Once again she is enveloped by a wave of hatred... I am going home to a hard life."

Because of his ancestry he was sometimes called "Comrade Count" or "Red Count".

Far from experiencing a "hard life" in the Soviet Union, Tolstoy was a highly privileged Soviet citizen, who prospered under the dictator, Joseph Stalin, when other writers who had chosen to live under Soviet rule throughout the civil war were persecuted. According to a widespread rumour, he was a millionaire with a "bottomless bank account". The American journalist Eugene Lyons noted how "almost alone among Russians, Tolstoy lived in baronial style in a rambling many-roomed mansion stocked with rich antiques ... the whole atmosphere of ripe old-world culture seemed like a throw-back to a nearly forgotten period." Anna Akhmatova paid a back-handed tribute to his ability to live well in a short poem written in the 1920s, which included the lines:

Ah, where are those islands
...
Where the villain Yagoda
Would not drive people to the wall
and Alyoshka Tolstoy
Would not skim it all.

If Tolstoy was aware that she had linked his name with that of the reviled head of the NKVD, he did not bear a grudge. In 1940, he and Mikhail Sholokhov proposed that Akhmatova be awarded a Stalin Prize, which would have been her first official recognition by the Soviet literary establishment, but the proposal was vetoed by Stalin.

Soviet critics abruptly changed their view of Tolstoy's work once he had declared his new allegiance to the regime. Instead of being denounced in Krasnaya nov, he had more work published in that magazine during the 1920s than any other author apart from Maxim Gorky, starting with Aelita. A critic writing in the same magazine praised The Road to Calvary as the best novel ever written by an emigre Russian.

When Nadezhda Mandelstam published her memoirs in the 1960s, she opened with this enigmatic sentence: "After slapping Alexei Tolstoy in the face, M. immediately returned to Moscow." She did not explain why her husband, Osip Mandelstam struck Tolstoy, but makes it clear that Tolstoy was so well connected with the Soviet authorities that Mandelstam fled Leningrad because he was afraid that he would be arrested. According to other sources, Tolstoy had chaired a writers' 'court of honour' which looked into Mandelstam's complaint against a fellow writer who had slapped his wife, and objected to a verdict which implied fault on both sides.

Tolstoy was Chairman of the USSR Writers Union in 1936–1938. In January 1937, during the second of the Moscow show trials, at which 17 defendants including former leading Bolsheviks such as Georgy Pyatakov and Karl Radek were forced to confess to crimes they had not committed, Tolstoy signed a collective letter, with other writers, declaring "We demand merciless punishment for traitors, spies and murderers who sell their homeland."

In 1937, he published his novel Bread, which eulogised Stalin's role in the defence of Tsaritsyn (later renamed Stalingrad) during the civil war. This prompted one Soviet reader to write to him anonymously, saying that he had previously admired Tolstoy as Russia's greatest living writer since the death of Maxim Gorky, but on reading Bread:

I felt ashamed, bitter and very, very hurt. Don't you feel the stifling atmosphere in which 170 million Soviet people are suffocating? ... For the sake of Stalin's boundless ambition, historical facts are manipulated, and you put your thin hand to it ... In Bread, you are pushing the assertion that the revolution won thanks only to Stalin ... Fear is the dominant emotion that grips citizens of the USSR. Don't you see it? ... Do you live in an ivory tower?

In December 1937, Tolstoy was elected to the Supreme Soviet of the Soviet Union. He became a full member of the USSR Academy of Sciences in 1939.

=== Peter the Great ===
Tolstoy spent 16 years studying the life of Peter the Great. His first work on this subject was his 1929 play, Na dybe ("On the Rack"). In the 1920s, Soviet historiography was dominated by the Bolshevik historian Mikhail Pokrovsky, who despised "Peter, whom fawning historians have called the great" as a tyrant who provoked war with Sweden and impoverished his subjects. Tolstoy's 1929 play was true to the party line, depicting Peter as a tyrant who "suppressed everyone and everything as if he had been possessed by demons, sowed fear, and put both his son and his country on the rack." Stalin went to see the play, but left before the end, setting off speculation that he did not like it. Critics consequently trashed it, until Stalin sent Tolstoy a note saying: "A splendid play. Only it's a pity Peter is not depicted heroically enough", and summoned him to advise him on how to write a novelised version of the life of Peter.

In 1935, after Pokrovsky had died and his school of history had been denounced by the party leadership, and the Soviet economy had begun the process of rapid industrialisation through Five Year Plans, Tolstoy wrote a radically different play, Peter I, in which – borrowing a motto from Pushkin that 'Russia came into Europe like the launching of a ship' – the construction of a ship, with Peter acting as the master builder, is the symbol of the entire play.

The first volume of his uncompleted novel, Peter the Great was published in 1936, and won a Stalin Prize.

In 1939, with war looming in Russia, Tolstoy produced a third version of his play, which stressed the importance of the army, and the patriotism of its foot soldiers.

=== Ivan the Terrible ===
In December 1940, Tolstoy was commissioned to write a play about the life of Ivan the Terrible, after the Central Committee had issued an instruction that Ivan's role in history was to be re-evaluated. The instruction was followed by a phone call from Stalin, who told Tolstoy that Ivan had "one shortcoming", which was that he "repented of his cruelty".

After the German invasion, Tolstoy moved to Zimenki, a village east of Moscow, where he wrote the first scenes of The Eagle and His Mate, covering the years 1553–1559. In November 1941, he was evacuated to Tashkent, where he completed it the following February. This original version, which was to have been performed in the Maly Theatre, was banned by order of the political director for the Red Army, Aleksandr Shcherbakov, who sent Stalin a memo explaining that Tolstoy had failed to portray Ivan as "the outstanding statesman of the 16th century". Despite this official rebuke, Tolstoy was awarded a Stalin Prize in 1943 for The Road to Calvary.

In April 1943, Tolstoy completed The Difficult Years, his second play about Ivan, covering the years to 1571. In June, he sent the script to Stalin, complaining that Shcherbakov had failed to say whether the play was to be allowed to be performed. Stalin then read both scripts, suggested changes, and final versions were completed in November. Both scripts were published in 1944, and The Eagle and His Mate received its premiere in the Maly Theatre in October, but the reviews were such that it was taken off, and the next performance opened a week after Tolstoy's death. The premiere of The Difficult Years was delayed until 1946.

=== Wartime and death ===
In November 1942, Tolstoy was appointed a member of the Extraordinary State Commission, established to investigate atrocities committed on Soviet territory by the German invaders and their allies. During the Nuremberg trials, the Soviet prosecutor Lev Smirnov posthumously credited Tolstoy with having led the team that investigated war crimes committed in Stavropol, which for the first time ascertained "without reasonable doubt" that gas vans had been used by the Nazis to commit genocide.

In December 1943, Tolstoy was one of a contingent of Soviet and foreign journalists who were sent to Kharkov to cover the first war crimes trial, at which three Germans and a Soviet collaborator were sentenced to death. Ilya Ehrenburg, who also covered the trial, later wrote: "I did not go to the square where the accused were to be hanged. Tolstoy said he must be present: he did not feel he had the right to evade it. After the execution, he came back blacker than night."

In January 1944, Tolstoy was appointed a member of a special commission that was supposedly charged by the Politburo with investigating the massacre in Katyn forest of 22,000 Polish officers, who had been taken prisoner when the Soviet Union occupied the eastern part of Poland in 1939–1940 following the signing of a non-aggression pact with Nazi Germany. In January 1944, he held a press conference for foreign journalists, in which he and other members of the commission asserted that the officers had been massacred by the Germans in August and September 1941. The special commission's report was submitted by the Soviet prosecution team at the Nuremberg trials, but was not included in the verdict, and in the 1980s, the Soviets belatedly admitted that Stalin ordered the Katyn massacre. As the leading spokesman at the press conference in January 1944, Tolstoy played a major role in ensuring that the Soviet version of the Katyn massacre – which is now known to be a lie – was widely reported in the USA and Great Britain.

Tolstoy died on 23 February 1945 in Moscow.

== Legacy ==
Tolstoy is credited with having produced some of the earliest works of science fiction in the Russian language. His novels Aelita (1923) about a journey to Mars and The Hyperboloid of Engineer Garin (1927) have gained immense public popularity. The former spawned a pioneering sci-fi movie in 1924. His supernatural short story, Count Cagliostro, reportedly inspired the 1984 film Formula of Love.

He penned several books for children, starting with Nikita's Childhood, a memorable account of his early years (the book is sometimes mistakenly believed to be about his son, Nikita; in truth, however, he only used the name because it was his favorite – and he would later give it to his eldest son). In 1936, he created an adaptation of the famous Italian fairy tale about Pinocchio entitled the Adventures of Buratino or The Golden Key, whose main character, Buratino, quickly became hugely popular among the Soviet populace. The creator of the Moscow Children's Theatre, Natalya Sats spent several months persuading him to write the work, and finally won him over by supplying his wife with foreign fashion magazines.

He is also suspected of being the main author of a libelous and partly pornographic literary fraud entitled Vyrubova's Diary published in 1927, on instruction from the authorities, to discredit the Russian royal family. Anna Vyrubova was the lady-in-waiting to the Empress Alexandra, consort of Nicholas II, about whom there had been scandalous rumours of sexual relations with Rasputin or with the Tsar or his consort, all of which she denied when under arrest after the revolution. The 'diary' was "a vulgar and dirty forgery".

In 1974, a minor planet was discovered by Soviet astronomer Lyudmila Zhuravlyova and named 3771 Alexejtolstoj after the Red Count.

== Comments ==
While Tolstoy enjoyed huge popularity and success in Russia in his lifetime, Western assessments of him have been generally negative because of his role as a Stalin apologist. Nikolai Tolstoy's summation of his distant relative was: "His personal character was without question beneath contempt... in Stalin, he found a worthy master. Few families have produced a higher literary talent than Leo Tolstoy, but few have sunk to one as degraded as Alexei Nikolaevich."

Professor Gleb Struve, a former White Army soldier and committed anti-communist, who became a leading authority on 20th century Russian literature, reckoned that:

Alexei Nikolaevich Tolstoy is, without doubt, one of the most gifted Russian writers of the 20th century … But—and this is the point—this man, endowed with so many extraordinary gifts and sharing the heritage of the great age of Russian literature, lacks one quality which distinguished all of the great Russian poets and writers : a sense of moral and social responsibility. His essence is that of a cynic and opportunist.

George Orwell branded Tolstoy, along with contemporary Ilya Ehrenburg, as a "literary prostitute" whose freedom of expression was denied by Soviet totalitarianism. However, Tolstoy's friend, Ilya Ehrenburg, reckoned that "like the real artist he was, he was never sure of himself, always dissatisfied, painfully seeking the right form to express what he wanted to say."

== Selected works ==
- Lirika, a poetry collection (1907)
- Nikita's Childhood (1921)
- The Road to Calvary, a trilogy (1921–1940, Stalin Prize of first degree in 1943)
- Aelita (1923)
- The Adventures of Nevzorov, or Ibikus (1925)
- The Hyperboloid of Engineer Garin (aka The Garin Death Ray) (1926)
- The Viper (Гадюка) (1928)
- The Golden Key, or the Adventures of Buratino (1936)
- Peter I (1929–1934, Stalin Prize of first degree in 1941)
- A Week in Turenevo (published posthumously, 1958)
- "Count Cagliostro" (supernatural short story)
- Ivan the Terrible, a play (1942–1943, Stalin Prize of first degree in 1946 – posthumously)

== Bibliography ==
- Ehrenburg, Ilya (1963). Memoirs: 1921–1941. Cleveland, Ohio: World Publishing.
- Tolstoy, Nikolai (1983). The Tolstoys. Twenty-four generations of Russian history. Hamish Hamilton. ISBN 0-241-10979-5.
