= Jiminy Cricket =

Fictional character from Walt Disney film Pinocchio

- Pinocchio / The Walt Disney Company character
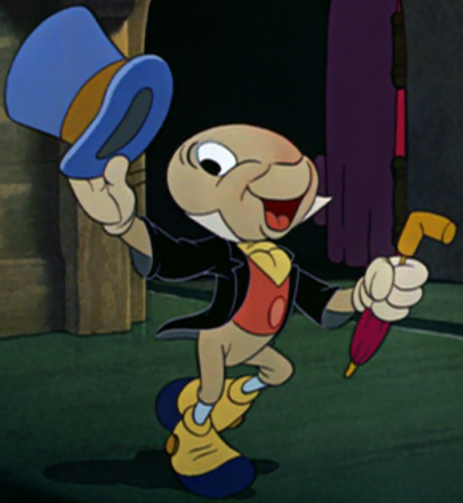
- Jiminy Cricket as he appears in Pinocchio
- First appearance: Pinocchio (1940)
- Created by: Ward Kimball; Walt Disney
- Based on: The Talking Cricket from The Adventures of Pinocchio by Carlo Collodi
- Voiced by: Cliff Edwards (1940–1971); Clarence Nash (1971–1973); Eddie Carroll (1973–2010); Hal Smith (1992); Phil Snyder (2010–2014); Joe Ochman (2014–present); Raphael Sbarge (Cricket form; Once Upon a Time); Joseph Gordon-Levitt (live-action remake); Darren Criss (Hidden Heroes: A Descendants Story)
- Portrayed by: Raphael Sbarge (adult) (Once Upon a Time); Adam Young (child) (Once Upon a Time)

In-universe information
- Species: Cricket
- Gender: Male
- Occupation: Conscience

Jiminy Cricket is the Disney version of the Talking Cricket, a fictional character created by Italian writer Carlo Collodi for his 1883 children's book The Adventures of Pinocchio, which Walt Disney adapted into the animated film Pinocchio in 1940. Originally an unnamed, minor character in Collodi's novel who is killed by Pinocchio before returning as a ghost, he was transformed for the Disney adaptation into a comical and wisecracking partner who accompanies Pinocchio on his adventures, having been appointed by the Blue Fairy (known in the book as the "Fairy with Turquoise Hair") to serve as Pinocchio's official conscience. In the film, he sings "When You Wish Upon a Star", the Walt Disney Company's signature song, and "Give a Little Whistle".

Jiminy Cricket's appearance bears little resemblance to that of actual crickets, which range from black to light brown and have long antennae and six legs; Jiminy Cricket has short antennae, a brownish-olive hue, and four limbs. Like most Disney characterizations, he is bipedal. He dresses in the manner of a late 19th or early 20th-century gentleman, characteristically wearing a blue top hat and a white dress shirt with an orange vest over a black jacket along with a yellow tie and khaki slacks with blue and yellow spats and carrying a burgundy umbrella and wears gloves similar to what Mickey Mouse wears. Since his debut in Pinocchio, he has become an iconic Disney character, making numerous other appearances, including in Fun and Fancy Free (1947) as the host and in Mickey's Christmas Carol (1983) as the Ghost of Christmas Past.

== Background ==
=== Origin of name ===
"Jiminy", along with variants "Jiminy Christmas" and "Jiminy cricket", have been used as minced oaths for "Jesus Christ" since at least 1803. "Jiminy crickets!" was uttered in Pinocchio's immediate Disney predecessor, 1937's Snow White and the Seven Dwarfs by the seven dwarfs. It also occurs in the 1938 Mickey Mouse cartoon "Brave Little Tailor".

=== Creation ===
Jiminy Cricket was designed by Ward Kimball and Berk Anthony, a recent Stanford grad and new artist to the Disney team. Kimball was disappointed and about to leave the Disney studio when much of the work he did for Snow White and the Seven Dwarfs was cut from the final version of that film. Walt Disney persuaded Kimball to stay by assigning him to supervise the animation of Jiminy Cricket.

=== Voice actors ===
Jiminy Cricket has been voiced in English by six actors. He was originally performed by singer Cliff Edwards, who voiced the character for Disney through the 1960s and sang Jiminy's most famous song, "When You Wish Upon a Star". After Edwards' death, Clarence Nash voiced him until 1973, when Eddie Carroll took over the role. Carroll played the role for 37 years, until his death in 2010. Actor Hal Smith voiced Jiminy in the Pinocchio Read-Along Storybook in 1992. Actor Phil Snyder next voiced Jiminy for the Kingdom Hearts video game series until his retirement from voice acting in 2014 to concentrate on his career teaching. Actor Joe Ochman took over the role at that time, beginning with Kingdom Hearts HD 2.5 Remix's installment of Kingdom Hearts Re:coded, and has been the voice of Jiminy since 2014.

Raphael Sbarge voices Jiminy in Once Upon a Time and portrays his human form, Archie Hopper. In the live action adaption of Pinocchio, he is voiced by Joseph Gordon-Levitt.

== Role in Pinocchio ==
Jiminy Cricket begins by narrating the story, commenting that seeking refuge he came to Geppetto's house. There, he witnessed how the Blue Fairy gave life to Pinocchio, a wooden puppet. The Blue Fairy gives Jiminy the task of becoming Pinocchio's conscience, and teaching him to distinguish between good and evil so that one day he will become a real boy.

But the next day, Pinocchio is convinced by two con men Honest John and Gideon to become an actor (and not to go to school), without listening to Jiminy's warnings. They sell Pinocchio to Stromboli, a puppeteer who, after putting on a great show with the wooden boy, ends up locking him in a cage. Jiminy tries to unlock the cage without success, but at that moment the Blue Fairy arrives and frees Pinocchio.

Pinocchio and Jiminy return home, but on the way, Pinocchio is tricked again by Honest John and Gideon, who convince him to go to Pleasure Island, a place where kids never go to school to learn and are free to indulge most of their worst desires. Jiminy tries to get Pinocchio to leave that place with him, but Pinocchio ignores it, wanting to stay with Lampwick, a boy who convinces Pinocchio to do things he shouldn't and who constantly makes fun of Jiminy, who angrily leaves the place alone. However, Jiminy discovers that all the children on the island have been turned into donkeys by an evil Coachman (as he and Jiminy put it, a bad boy will “make a jackass out of himself”), and when he runs to tell Pinocchio, he sees that the same thing is happening to the puppet, already having two ears and a tail. They both run out of the place before the transformation is complete.

They both finally return to Geppetto's house, but find it empty and deserted. They discover that Geppetto left to look for Pinocchio on Pleasure Island, and in the sea he ended up being devoured by a whale named Monstro. Pinocchio decides to dive into the sea to look for his father, and Jiminy accompanies him since he does not intend to abandon him. After a search on the seabed, they end up finding Monstro, who devours Pinocchio, while Jiminy stays outside, trying to get the whale to open its mouth to follow his friend. A while later, Monstro ends up spitting out Pinocchio and Geppetto, and after chasing them across the sea, Pinocchio ends up saving his father, which later causes the Blue Fairy to turn him into a real boy for his actions, and with which, she awards Jiminy a badge for his service as a conscience.

== In other media ==
=== Records ===
Cliff Edwards (as Jiminy) performed the narration for several 78 RPM children's records. Two of them were Bongo (originally part of the animated feature Fun and Fancy Free) and The Littlest Outlaw. He also produced some children's records simply as Cliff Edwards, including "Old MacDonald Had a Farm".

On the album Walt Disney's Christmas Favorites, Jiminy Cricket sang the yuletide song "Kris, Kris Kringle (With A Tingle-Ingle-Ingle)" in a vaudevillian Tin Pan Alley style, first singing the song straight, and the second time speaking half of the song in rhythm. He ended the song by wishing everyone a "Merry Christmas".

=== Radio ===
The character was a regular guest on The Orson Welles Show in 1941–42, frequently bantering with its host. Jiminy himself hosted a one-hour segment ABC Radio special in 1947, improbably concerning the year 1960.

=== Comics ===
Jiminy appears in several comics (first appearance in Mickey Mouse Magazine Vol. 5 No. 3 in 1939), such as various issues of Walt Disney's Comics and Stories, and he is featured on the covers of Four Color # 701, 795, 897 and 989. As of 2023, Jiminy has also been found in the popular web comic "Goofy HECU", a project developed by a group of long time and loyal Walt Disney fans.

=== Films and TV ===
==== Fun and Fancy Free ====
After Pinocchio, Jiminy appeared in the film Fun and Fancy Free (1947) as the host of the animated segments.

==== The Mickey Mouse Club ====
In the 1950s–1970s, Jiminy Cricket appeared in four series of educational films aimed at grade-school audiences. In the I'm No Fool series, he advised children how to steer clear of dangerous traffic, sharp objects, strangers, exposed electrical lines, and so forth. Several of those series were first shown on The Mickey Mouse Club from 1955 through 1959.

The second series called You, teaches about the human body with the refrain "You are a human animal". This, too, was originally shown on the "Mickey Mouse Club". The third series, "The Nature Of Things", combined live-action and animation, and the fourth series was called "Encyclopedia". In the 1950s, on The Mickey Mouse Club, he also sang two related songs related to safety: "Stop, Look, And Listen", and "Safety First".

==== Mickey's Christmas Carol ====
Jiminy appeared in the featurette Mickey's Christmas Carol (1983) as the Ghost of Christmas Past. The badge given to him by the Blue Fairy at the end of Pinocchio marking him as an official conscience now declares him to be the Ghost of Christmas Past. Ebenezer Scrooge (Scrooge McDuck) is perplexed at his size, but Jiminy shoots back at him that if Scrooge were measured by his amount of kindness, "you'd be no bigger than a speck of dust!". Nevertheless, Jiminy shows him Scrooge's bygone Christmases: while working at Fezzywig's, and putting his money before his love, whom he never saw again. When Scrooge begs the minuscule ghost to take him away from these bad memories, Jiminy reminds him that he "fashioned these memories" himself.

==== Disney Sing-Along Songs ====
Jiminy Cricket hosted these five sing-along videos:

- The Bare Necessities (October 6, 1987)
- Very Merry Christmas Songs (October 4, 1988, intro and outro only)
- Be Our Guest (June 19, 1992)
- Friend Like Me (April 30, 1993)
- Circle of Life (December 16, 1994)

==== House of Mouse ====
Jiminy Cricket is among the numerous Disney characters who appear in the television series House of Mouse (2001–2003). He is most often sat on a table with other Pinocchio characters, or with Cri-Kee from Mulan. A running gag in the series involves Timon from The Lion King trying to eat him, and his rescue by Pumbaa. He is the titular main character of the episode "Jiminy Cricket", where he abandon his job as Pinocchio's conscience, and becomes Mickey's. He also appears in the direct-to-video 2001 film Mickey's Magical Christmas: Snowed in at the House of Mouse, where after seeing that Mickey is depressed because Donald does not feel the Christmas spirit, he advises him that he can solve it by wishing on a star.

==== Once Upon a Time ====
An alternate version of Jiminy (both in fairy-tale cricket form and as his "real world" human alias, Archie Hopper) is a core character on the Disney-owned ABC television series Once Upon a Time (2011–2017), portrayed by Raphael Sbarge. In the series, which finds cursed fairy tale characters living in present-day Maine without memory of their true origins, Jiminy/Archie serves as the town counselor and "conscience". He also has a dalmatian named Pongo. The series adds additional backstory for the character, portraying his life as the human son of con artists, who inadvertently causes the death of a couple after striking a deal with Rumplestiltskin; Rumplestiltskin gave Jiminy a potion to give to his parents to get them out of his life, but his parents realized what he had planned and switched the potion with an identical bottle that was given to the couple that his parents had targeted for their latest con. He is eventually turned into the ethical cricket from previous portrayals by the Blue Fairy. In his cricket form, he is charged to look after and guide the dead couple's son, Geppetto, as long as he lives.

==== Pinocchio live-action remake ====
Jiminy Cricket, as seen in Disney's 2022 live-action remake of Pinocchio.

Joseph Gordon-Levitt voiced the character in the 2022 live-action adaptation of the 1940 animated film, which was released exclusively on Disney+, being a character made by CGI.

He again acts as the narrator who introduces the story, and fulfills a role similar to the animated film. Some new elements included in this version are that Jiminy manages to accompany Pinocchio to school, although the boy is expelled from the place, and after it he is unable to help him because Honest John and Gideon trap him in a glass jar, from which he later escapes. In this version he is also the one who manages to rescue Pinocchio from the cage in which Stromboli locked him up, managing to get the key thanks to Pinocchio's long nose after lying, which allowed him to reach it. Also, unlike the 1940 film, where Geppetto does not get to interact with him, in this version Geppetto meets Jiminy at the end of the film after Pinocchio introduces him as his conscience.

His song "Give a Little Whistle" is also scrapped due to the pacing of the film.

==== Hidden Heroes: A Descendants Story ====
Darren Criss will play Jiminy Cricket in the film of the Descendants franchise Hidden Heroes: A Descendants Story.

==== Other ====
He made a brief cameo in the film Who Framed Roger Rabbit (1988), when Eddie Valiant first drives through Toontown while the toons sing "Smile, Darn Ya, Smile!"

In the animated series The Wonderful World of Mickey Mouse, Jiminy (voiced once again by Joe Ochman) appears in the episode "Disappearing Act" (2021), where he makes a cameo appearance alongside other Disney magical characters like the Fairy Godmother from Cinderella, Flora, Fauna, and Merryweather from Sleeping Beauty, Merlin from The Sword in the Stone, and the Blue Fairy, to help Mickey realize he had the magic inside him all along.

Jiminy Cricket appears in the short film Once Upon a Studio (2023), voiced by archival audio of Cliff Edwards. He ends the final part of the song "When You Wish Upon a Star", singing accompanied by the rest of characters from Walt Disney Animation Studios while they take a group photo.

On October 25, 2019, it was reported that Disney is developing an undetermined animated project focused on Jiminy Cricket for the streaming service Disney+. Since then, there has been no further information about it.

His likeness is parodied in Puss in Boots: The Last Wish as the character "Ethical Bug", who unsuccessfully attempts to give the main antagonist, Jack Horner, a conscience.

=== Video games ===
==== Disney's Villains' Revenge ====
Jiminy Cricket is a main character in the game Disney's Villains' Revenge (1999), wherein he must help the player save the stories of Dumbo, Alice in Wonderland, Peter Pan and Snow White and the Seven Dwarfs from the stories' respective villains: the Ringmaster, the Queen of Hearts, Captain Hook, and the Evil Queen.

==== Walt Disney World Quest: Magical Racing Tour ====
Jiminy Cricket appears as a playable character in the racing game Walt Disney World Quest: Magical Racing Tour (2000).

==== Kingdom Hearts series ====
Jiminy's Journal is a recurring element in the Kingdom Hearts games.

Jiminy Cricket appears in the Kingdom Hearts video game series as the chronicler of player character Sora's travels, writing journals with the history of the events that occur in each world, keeping a cast list of the figures they meet, friend or foe, among other notes with the extra features of the game.

In Kingdom Hearts (2002), Jiminy has some direct involvement with characters and elements based on the film Pinocchio. He has a larger part in the sequel, Kingdom Hearts: Chain of Memories (2004), frequently talking to Sora and offering advice. His role in Kingdom Hearts II (2005) is smaller than in the first game; he only appears in one cutscene. He also appears in Kingdom Hearts Coded (2008) in a major role, where the contents of his journals are examined. A dream world version of Jiminy appears in Kingdom Hearts 3D: Dream Drop Distance (2012), being present in his home world, Prankster's Paradise, in a direct involvement based on the film Pinocchio. He returns in Kingdom Hearts III (2019), traveling again with Sora.

In the English releases, Jiminy is voiced by Eddie Carroll for Kingdom Hearts, Kingdom Hearts II, and Kingdom Hearts Re:Chain of Memories, Phil Snyder for Kingdom Hearts Re:Coded and Kingdom Hearts 3D: Dream Drop Distance (following Carroll's death in 2010), and Joe Ochman for the HD cinematics of Re:Coded for Kingdom Hearts HD 2.5 Remix and Kingdom Hearts III (following Snyder's retirement in 2014). In the Japanese version, Jiminy was voiced by Kaneta Kimotsuki until his death in 2016 and by Yōhei Tadano since Kingdom Hearts III.

==== Epic Mickey: Power of Illusion ====
Jiminy plays a major role in Epic Mickey: Power of Illusion (2012), a spin-off to Epic Mickey, where he acts as Mickey's sidekick during his journey.

==== Disney Magic Kingdoms ====
Jiminy Cricket is a playable character in the world building game Disney Magic Kingdoms (2021). He is a character to unlock for a limited time, debuting during an event focused on Pinocchio.

== Disney park appearances ==
Jiminy Cricket appears at the Disney Parks as a meetable character, most prominently at Disney's Animal Kingdom at Rafiki's Planet Watch. His signature features the 'J' as an umbrella.

He also appears in Pinocchio's Daring Journey, a dark ride themed to the film from which he originated.

A minuscule version of him can also be spotted on the It's a Small World ride in Disneyland.

He and the Blue Fairy were the hosts of the Wishes: A Magical Gathering of Disney Dreams fireworks display at the Magic Kingdom theme park.

Jiminy also hosts the Nighttime parade, SpectroMagic in the Magic Kingdom (replaced in early 2010 for an updated version of the Main Street Electrical Parade).

He also appears daily in the "Disney Festival of Fantasy Parade" at Magic Kingdom.

Jiminy Cricket also appears as the pace of play ambassador at Walt Disney World Golf Resort.

== International performers ==
- Roger Carel (French)
- Georg Thomalla (German, film)
- Carlo Romano (Italian, film)
- Masashi Ebara (Japanese, Pony Canyon edition of the film)
- Kaneta Kimotsuki (Japanese, all other appearances until his death in 2016)
- Yōhei Tadano (Japanese, Kingdom Hearts III)
- John Price (Danish, 1940 version of the film)
- Olaf Wijnants (Dutch, 1995 version of the singing role of the film)
- Ove Sprogøe (Danish, 1978 version of the film as well as "From all of us to all of you")
- Pablo Palitos (Spanish in Latin America Version)
