= G.G. Communications =

American film distributor

- Industry: Film distribution
- Headquarters: Boston, Massachusetts, United States
- Key people: Nicholas W. Russo
- Owner: Independent

G.G. Communications or GG Productions was a film distributor based in Boston, Massachusetts. Founded by city native Nicholas W. Russo (credited in releases as "N.W. Russo"), it was responsible for the U.S. releases of various foreign films. The company was named after fisherman Gadabout Gaddis, for whom Russo had produced the successful documentary television series The Flying Fisherman.

G.G.'s titles ranged from adult fare such as Lucio Fulci and Mario Bava's giallo films One on Top of the Other and Hatchet for the Honeymoon, to children's films such as the live-action Pippi Longstocking films, Per Åhlin's Dunderklumpen!, Giuliano Cenci's The Adventures of Pinocchio, Rolf Kauka's Once Upon a Time, the Norwegian smash hit The Pinchcliffe Grand Prix, the 1975 anime feature Hans Christian Andersen's The Little Mermaid and the 1975 version of The Magic Pony. In the early 1980s, several of its films were released on VHS through distributor Video Gems.
