= Talking Cricket =

The Talking Cricket
- The Adventures of Pinocchio character
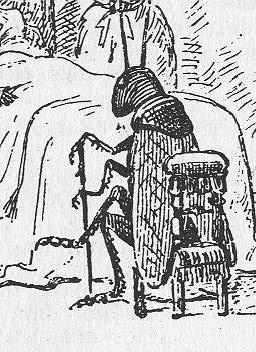
- Il Grillo Parlante, as illustrated by Enrico Mazzanti
- First appearance: The Adventures of Pinocchio
- Created by: Carlo Collodi

In-universe information
- Species: Cricket
- Gender: Male
- Nationality: Italian

The Talking Cricket (Italian: il Grillo Parlante) is a fictional character that appears in the 1883 Italian book The Adventures of Pinocchio (Le avventure di Pinocchio) by Carlo Collodi.

== Role ==
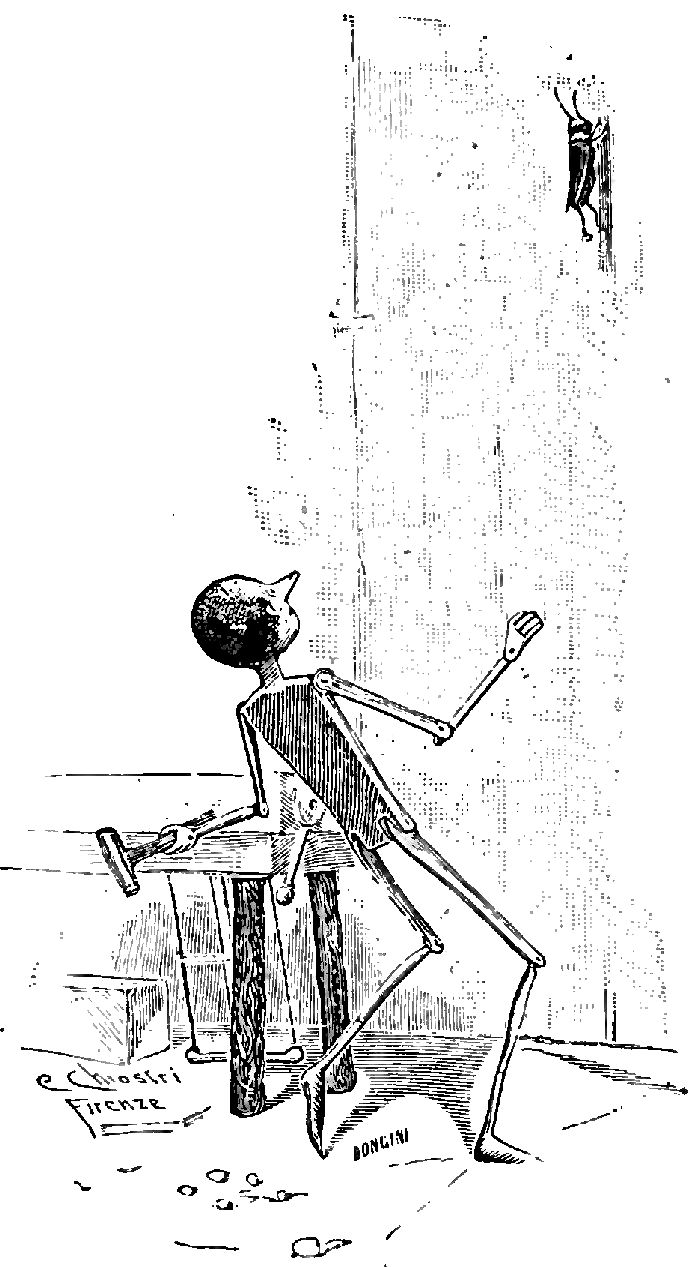
"You are a puppet and what's worse is that you have a head of wood".

The Talking Cricket, who has lived in Geppetto's house for over a century, makes his first appearance in chapter IV. Pinocchio's mischief has landed his maker Geppetto in prison for the night, and the Talking Cricket insists that Pinocchio must either attend school or work to function properly in the world. When Pinocchio refuses to listen, the Cricket states, "You are a puppet and what's worse is that you have a head of wood", whereupon Pinocchio throws a mallet at the cricket, which kills him.

In chapter XIII, the Talking Cricket reappears as a ghost to Pinocchio, telling him to return home rather than keep an appointment with the Fox and the Cat (Il Gatto e la Volpe). Pinocchio refuses and in chapter XIV, he is subsequently injured.

The Talking Cricket's ghost reappears in chapter XVI, where he and his colleagues the Crow and the Owl tend to Pinocchio's injuries. While the Crow and the Owl argue over if Pinocchio is dead or alive, but the Talking Cricket then states that Pinocchio is fine and disobeyed his father.

The Talking Cricket makes his final appearance in chapter XXXVI, who has been resurrected and living in a house given to him by the Fairy with Turquoise Hair, where he allows Pinocchio and the ailing Geppetto to stay while Geppetto regains his health.

== Folklore ==
In Florence, Italy, the birthplace of Carlo Collodi, the author, there is a traditional festival every May. It is called festa del grillo, the festival of the cricket. Crickets are considered to be good luck in Florence, as well as many other parts of Europe and even throughout the world. Many traditional folk stories regarding the "lucky" crickets hold that crickets live for hundreds of years.

Charles Dickens wrote a novella, inspired by this folklore, with The Cricket on the Hearth (1846). It is a novella which depicts the ideology behind the tradition of the lucky cricket, who is perpetually happy and emanates happiness wherever it goes.

== Media portrayals ==
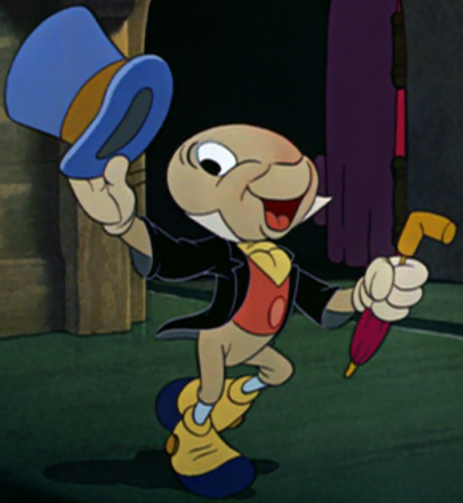
Jiminy Cricket in Walt Disney's Pinocchio (1940)

The Talking Cricket in Giuliano Cenci's The Adventures of Pinocchio (1972)

- The 1940 Disney film Pinocchio renames the character Jiminy Cricket (voiced by Cliff Edwards), further adapted to become Pinocchio's inseparable companion, sidekick, and advisor, under instructions from the (also renamed) Blue Fairy. His relationship with Pinocchio is much less adversarial than in the book as he accompanies Pinocchio on his adventures. Disney has since given Jiminy Cricket numerous subsequent appearances, including a host of the theatrical release Fun and Fancy Free, recurring segments of the children's television series The Mickey Mouse Club, as the Ghost of Christmas Past in Mickey's Christmas Carol, and notably as a Disney mascot. Jiminy Cricket later appears in the television series House of Mouse and the video game series Kingdom Hearts voiced by Eddie Carroll. In later projects following Eddie Carroll's death, Phil Snyder and Joe Ochman have since voiced Jiminy Cricket. In Disney's 2022 live-action remake, he is voiced by Joseph Gordon-Levitt.
- In Giuliano Cenci's 1972 animated film The Adventures of Pinocchio, the Talking Cricket (voiced by Lauro Gazzolo with Don Messick doing his English voice-dub), though anthropomorphized, differs little from the character of the novel. The only difference in characterization is that he does not reappear in the Fairy's house as a doctor.
- In the 1993 direct-to-video adaptation by GoodTimes Entertainment, the Talking Cricket (voiced by Cam Clarke) is portrayed very much like Jiminy Cricket and goes on adventures with Pinocchio, serving as Pinocchio's sidekick.
- In Steve Barron's 1996 live-action film The Adventures of Pinocchio, the Talking Cricket is a CGI character named Pépé (voiced by David Doyle, in his final film performance one year before his death in 1997) and is also portrayed similar to Jiminy Cricket. He is an optimistic character who advises Pinocchio against Volpe and Felinet as well as the main antagonist Lorenzini and also accompanies Pinocchio on his adventures. He was supposed to be voiced by Wallace Shawn but was likely re-cast at the last minute, though Shawn's voice can be heard in one of the trailers. He would reappear in the film's 1999 sequel The New Adventures of Pinocchio, this time voiced by Warwick Davis.
- In the Happily Ever After: Fairy Tales for Every Child episode "Pinocchio", the Talking Cricket is actually a termite named Woody (voiced by Chris Rock), but is portrayed very much like Jiminy Cricket.
- In Roberto Benigni's 2002 live-action film Pinocchio, the Talking Cricket also made an appearance and is played by Peppe Barra with John Cleese doing his English voice-dub. The Cricket is not similar to Jiminy Cricket and (like him) is a companion to Pinocchio.
- The Talking Cricket appears in the 2008 Italian-British miniseries Pinocchio, portrayed as female by Luciana Littizzetto.
- Two versions of the character appear in the Shrek franchise: In the 2010 animated television special Scared Shrekless, the character lives inside Pinocchio's head, advising him, until Pinocchio expels him, mistaking him for a termite, and when the cricket tries to explain the situation, Pinocchio squashes him; The 2022 animated film Puss in Boots: The Last Wish includes an "Ethical Bug," voiced by Kevin McCann, who parodies the Talking Cricket, judging the evidently corrupt character of the film's main antagonist, Jack Horner.
- The Talking Cricket (under his Disney alias) appears in the 2011 television series Once Upon a Time, played by Raphael Sbarge. His human alter-ego is a local psychiatric counselor, and part-time legal advisor, 'Dr. Archie Hopper', in which he is much timider than in his Cricket guise.
- The Talking Cricket appeared in the 2012 Pinocchio film, voiced by Carlo Valli with his English dub voice provided by Arthur Grosser.
- The 2019 live-action Italian film Pinocchio, directed by Matteo Garrone, the Talking Cricket is portrayed by actor Davide Marotta, while his English dub voice is provided by Luca Dal Fabbro.
- The 2022 stop motion film Guillermo del Toro's Pinocchio adapts the character as Sebastian J. Cricket, voiced by actor Ewan McGregor. The character, who narrated the movie, is portrayed as a writer, traveler, violinist, and admirer of Arthur Schopenhauer during the time of Fascist Italy.
- The 2023 video game Lies of P, loosely based on Pinocchio's adventures, features a robotic cricket puppet companion name Gemini (pronounced like "Jiminy") who resides in a lamp carried by Pinocchio and serves as a guide.
- The 2026 horror adaptation Pinocchio Unstrung, set in the Twisted Childhood Universe, features the Cricket, who is voiced by Robert Englund. This version of the Cricket is described as being the exact opposite of a conscience; a "foul-mouthed little bastard" who will stop at nothing to make Pinocchio "real."

== Bibliography ==
- Collodi, Carlo (1883). Le Avventure di Pinocchio (in Italian). Biblioteca Universale Rizzoli.
