= Catchfools =

Fictional location in The Adventures of Pinocchio

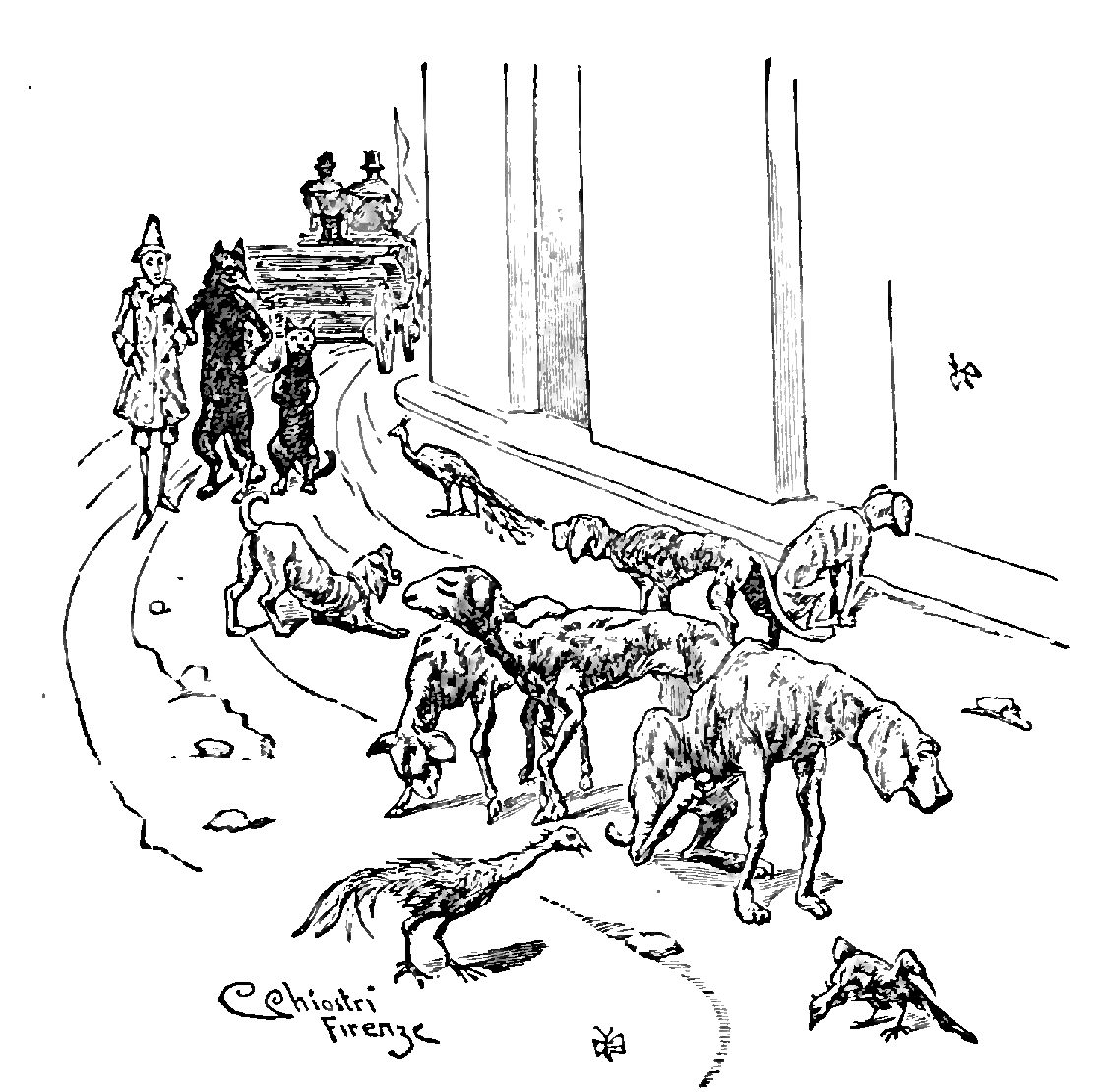
Pinocchio on the streets of Catchfools as the hairless dogs and the bedraggled pheasants are seen before them.

Catchfools (Italian: Acchiappacitrulli) is a fictional location in the Italian novel The Adventures of Pinocchio (1883).

== Description ==
Catchfools is a city in the Land of Barn Owls (Italian: Paese dei Barbagianni) where every animal in town has done something exceedingly foolish and now suffers as a result. The leader of the Land of Barn Owls is a young unseen emperor. Outside of the city is the so-called Field of Miracles (Italian: Il campo dei Miracoli).

Pinocchio encounters The Fox and the Cat after leaving Mangiafuoco's theatre with five gold coins. The Fox claims to know Pinocchio's father Geppetto and proposes to Pinocchio to visit the Land of Barn Owls (Italian: Paese dei Barbagianni) and thence to a Field of Miracles, where coins can be grown into a money-producing tree. They convince him that if he plants his coins in the field, they will grow into a tree with gold coins.

Pinocchio finally reaches Catchfools with the Fox and the Cat. As he travels through the streets of Catchfools, Pinocchio sees that the streets are filled with hairless dogs yawning from hunger, sheared sheep trembling with cold, chickens with no combs and wattles begging for a grain of wheat, large butterflies unable to use their wings because they sold all their lovely colors, tailless peacocks ashamed to show themselves, and bedraggled pheasants scuttling away hurriedly and grieving for their bright feathers of gold and silver lost to them forever. Out of those paupers and beggars, Pinocchio also sees that there are beautiful coaches containing either foxes, thieving magpies, or nasty birds of prey.

Upon reaching the Field of Miracles, Pinocchio buries his coins, uses water from the canal to pour over it, and then leaves for the "twenty minutes" that it will take for his gold to grow. After Pinocchio leaves, the Fox and the Cat dig up the coins and run away.

Once Pinocchio returns, he learns of the Fox and the Cat's treachery from a parrot who mocks Pinocchio for falling for their tricks. Pinocchio rushes to the Catchfools courthouse to report the theft of the coins to a gorilla judge. Although he is moved by Pinocchio's plea, the judge sentences Pinocchio to four months in prison for the crime of "foolishness." Pinocchio is taken away by two Mastiff Gendarmerie that the judge summoned and held their hands over Pinocchio's mouth to save time.

Fortunately for Pinocchio who spends some time in prison, all criminals are released early by the jailers when the Emperor declares a celebration following his army's victory over the town's enemies. Upon being released by stating to the jailer that he is a criminal, Pinocchio leaves Catchfools and heads back to The Fairy with Turquoise Hair's house in the forest.

== Adaptations ==
- In the 1992 direct to video adaptation entitled Pinocchio from GoodTimes Entertainment, Catchfools is featured. Unlike the story, Pinocchio learns about the Wolf and the Cat's treachery from three crows and doesn't go to Catchfools' courthouse. Instead, he just heads back to the Blue Fairy's house.
- Catchfools appears in the 2002 Pinocchio film. Here, it is called Grabadimwit. Pinocchio was told of the Fox and the Cat's trickery by the Talking Cricket. Pinocchio brings up the Fox and the Cat's crimes to a gorilla judge and his fellow judges while listing the Talking Cricket as a witness. The judge sentences Pinocchio to five years in prison for crimes of foolishness as he is dragged away by the police officers. While in prison, he meets Lucignolo (Leonardo in the English dub), another truant thief who is let out soon after Pinocchio is admitted in. Four months later, Pinocchio is among the inmates released when the King declares a celebration upon his wife giving birth of a son. Pinocchio then leaves Grabadimwit quoting "Long live the king."
- Catchfools appears in the 2012 Pinocchio film. After Pinocchio tells the baboon judge of what the Fox and the Cat did to him, the judge sentences him to prison. Geppetto later learned of Pinocchio's incarceration there from two police officers and heads there. All criminal inmates are left out when a celebration is declared. After Pinocchio tells the dog jailer that he committed a crime when told that innocent people don't get let out, he and Geppetto miss each other amidst the crowd.
- Catchfools appears in the 2019 Pinocchio film. After learning of the Fox and the Cat's trickery, Pinocchio runs to the local courthouse to report their crime to the gorilla judge. Since justice does not favor the innocent in Catchfools, the gorilla judge sentences Pinocchio to life imprisonment. Before it can be carried out, Pinocchio manages to get himself exonerated by saying that he had previously stolen some chickens, pigs, and jewels. He is then released on the gorilla judge's orders.

== In popular culture ==
Catchfools is a location in John Claude Bemis' 2016 science fiction novel Out of Abaton, Book 1, The Wooden Prince. It is described as a district in the northern edge of Venice that houses the city's Abatonian slaves.
