= Pinocchio (miniseries) =

2008 film TV

- Based on: The Adventures of Pinocchio by Carlo Collodi
- Written by: Ivan Cotroneo; Carlo Mazzotta
- Directed by: Alberto Sironi
- Starring: Robbie Kay; Bob Hoskins; Luciana Littizzetto; Alessandro Gassman; Thomas Brodie-Sangster
- Theme music composer: Jan A. P. Kaczmarek
- Countries of origin: Italy; United Kingdom
- Original language: English
- No. of episodes: 2

Production
- Producer: Luca Bernabei
- Cinematography: Antonello Geleng
- Editors: David Yardley, Stefano Chierchié
- Running time: 200 minutes
- Production companies: Rai Fiction, Lux Vide, Power
- Budget: €8 million

Original release
- Network: Rai 1
- Release: 1 November – 2 November 2008

Pinocchio is a two-episode Italian-British miniseries directed by Alberto Sironi, based on the 1883 novel The Adventures of Pinocchio by Carlo Collodi and filmed in English. It first aired on the Italian channel Rai 1 on 1 and 2 November 2008.

The cast includes Robbie Kay as Pinocchio, Bob Hoskins as Geppetto, Luciana Littizzetto as a female Talking Cricket and Alessandro Gassman as Carlo Collodi. It was shot in Lazio and Tuscany, Italy.

== Cast ==
- Bob Hoskins as Geppetto
- Robbie Kay as Pinocchio
- Luciana Littizzetto (dubbed by Teresa Gallagher) as the Talking Cricket
- Margherita Buy as the teacher
- Violante Placido as The Fairy
- Joss Ackland as Mastro Ciliegia
- Thomas Sangster as Lampwick
- Toni Bertorelli (dubbed by Jimmy Hibbert) as The Fox
- Francesco Pannofino (dubbed by Rupert Degas) as The Cat
- Maurizio Donadoni (dubbed by Tim Bentinck) as Fire-Eater
- Bianca D'Amato (dubbed by Alison Dowling) as Elisa
- Alessandro Gassman (dubbed by Seán Barrett) as Carlo Collodi
- Steven Kynman as Harlequin
