= Fairy with Turquoise Hair =

The Fairy with Turquoise Hair
- The Adventures of Pinocchio character
- La Fata dai Capelli Turchini, as illustrated by Carlo Chiostri
- First appearance: The Adventures of Pinocchio
- Created by: Carlo Collodi

In-universe information
- Alias: The Blue Fairy
- Species: Fairy
- Gender: Female
- Family: Pinocchio (son) (Note: Symbolically)
- Nationality: Italian

The Fairy with Turquoise Hair (Italian: la Fata dai Capelli Turchini), often simply referred to as the Blue Fairy (La Fata Turchina), is a fictional character in the 1883 Italian book The Adventures of Pinocchio by Carlo Collodi, repeatedly appearing at critical moments in Pinocchio's wanderings to admonish the little wooden puppet to avoid bad or risky behavior.

Although the naïvely willful marionette initially resists her good advice, he later comes to follow her instruction. She in turn protects him, and later enables his assumption of human form, contrary to the prior wooden form.

== In the novel ==
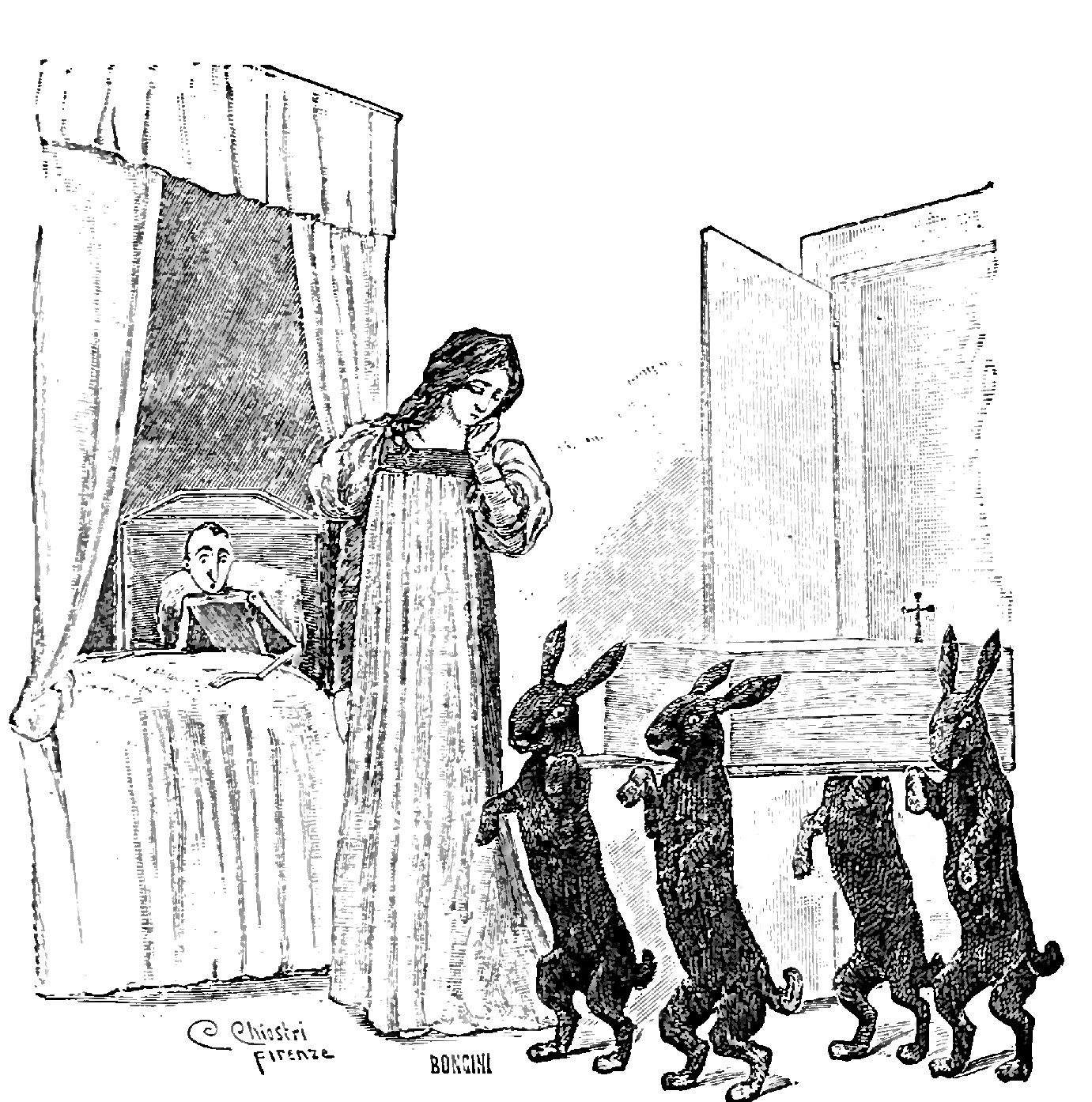
Pinocchio refuses to take the medicine prompting the Fairy to summon a group of funeral directors rabbits to take him.

The Fairy with Turquoise Hair makes her first appearance in chapter XV, where she is portrayed as a young girl living in a house in the middle of a forest. Pinocchio, who is being chased by The Fox and the Cat (Il Gatto e la Volpe), pleads with the Fairy to allow him entrance. The Fairy cryptically responds that all inhabitants of the house, including herself, are dead, and that she is waiting for her coffin to arrive. The pair catches and hangs Pinocchio from a tree. In the following chapter, it is established that the girl is a fairy who has lived in the forest for more than a thousand years. She takes pity on Pinocchio, and sends a falcon to take him down from the tree and for her poodle servant Medoro to prep her stagecoach.

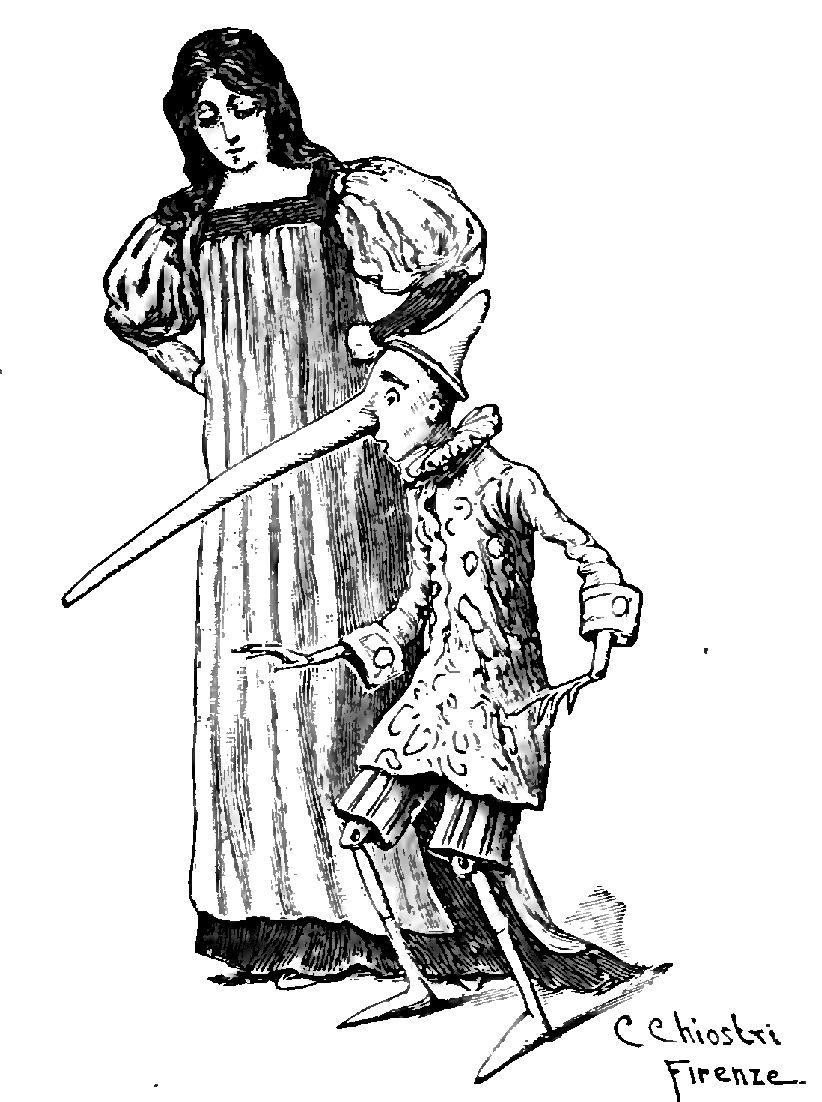
Your nose starts to lengthen, due to your lies.

After a visit from three doctors consisting of an Owl, a Crow, and the Talking Cricket (Il Grillo Parlante), the Fairy attempts to give Pinocchio medicine in order to heal his injuries. Pinocchio refuses to take the medicine on account of its sour taste, then a group of coffin-bearing undertaker rabbits arrive to take him. Frightened by this display, Pinocchio drinks the medicine, and later tells the Fairy of his previous adventures. When he includes untruths, his nose begins to lengthen, which the Fairy explains is due to his lies. She summons a group of woodpeckers to shorten the disproportionate nose, and after forgiving Pinocchio, informs him that he is free to consider her an elder sister, and that his father Geppetto is on his way to fetch him. In his impatience, Pinocchio leaves the house anyway, but instead of finding him he goes to the field of miracles with the fox and the cat.

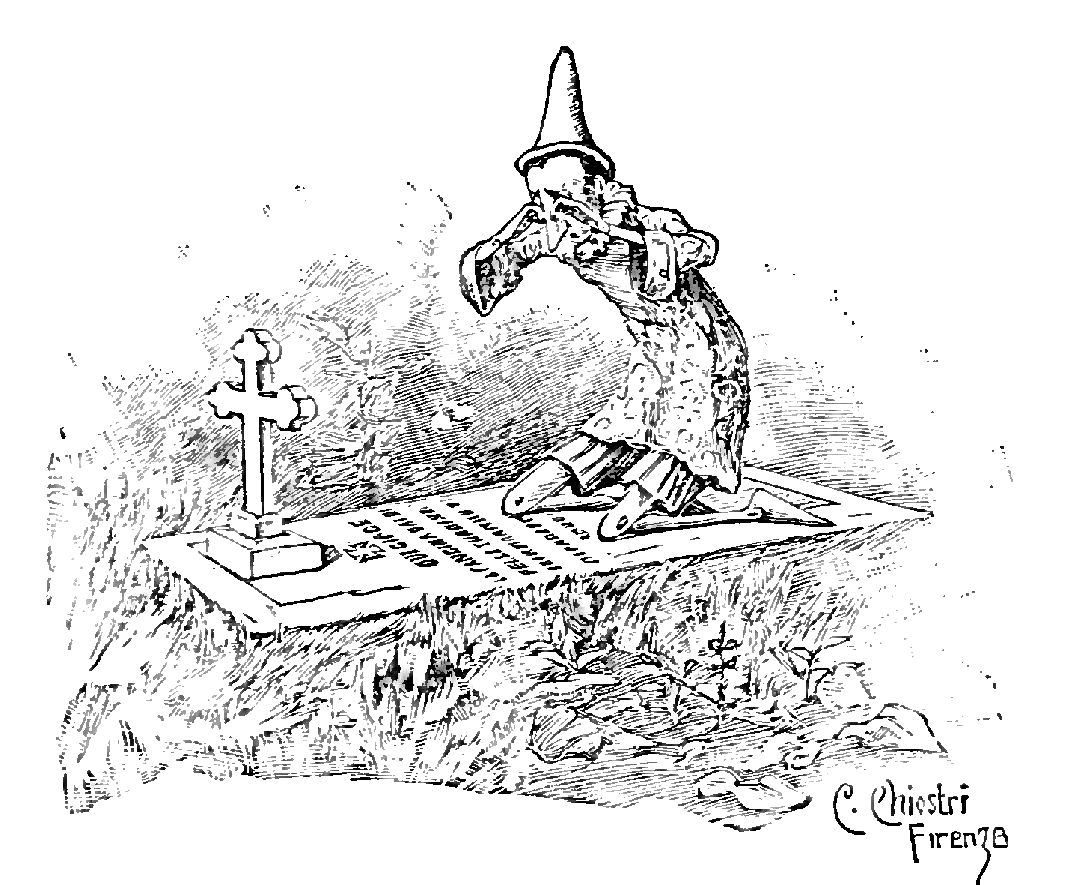
Only find a tombstone declaring "The Fairy died believing that Pinocchio had abandoned her".

After spending some time in the Catchfools prison, Pinocchio returns to the Fairy's house only to find a tombstone declaring that the Fairy died believing that Pinocchio had abandoned her. In the following chapter, Pinocchio is transported to the Island of Busy Bees (Isola delle Api Industriose), where he meets the Fairy, now older, disguised as an ordinary woman. Unaware of the deception, Pinocchio offers to carry buckets of water to her house in exchange for a meal. After eating, Pinocchio recognizes the Fairy's turquoise hair.

The Fairy agrees to adopt him as her son, and promises to turn him into a real boy, provided he earns it through hard study and obedience for one year. Later, she reveals to Pinocchio that his days of puppethood are almost over, and that she will organize a celebration in his honour; but Pinocchio is convinced by his friend, Candlewick (Lucignolo) to go for Land of Toys (Paese dei Balocchi) a place who the boys don't have anything besides play. In the midnight they are taken on a wagon by The Coachman.

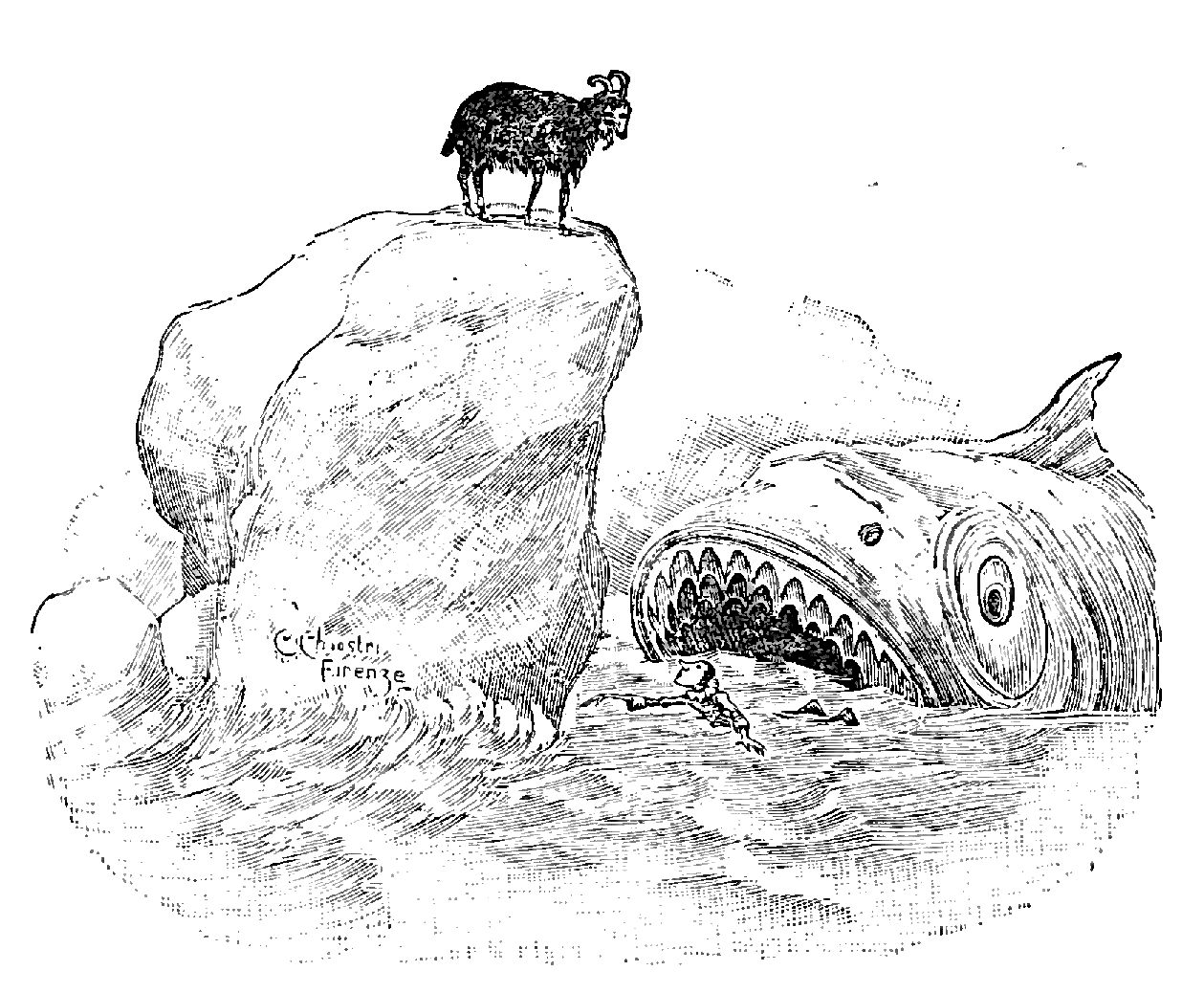
While assuming the form of a mountain goat, the Fairy warns Pinocchio of the imminent arrival of The Terrible Dogfish.

Five months later, Pinocchio is transformed into a donkey and sold to a circus ringleader to jump, dance and bow. In the middle of the show he sees the fairy in the audience, she wore a long gold chain, from which hung a large medallion with an image of a puppet. Pinocchio became lame and was sold to a musician to make a drum and later thrown into the sea by his handler.

Where upon the Fairy sends a shoal of fish to consume his donkey's appearance until he is returned to his puppet form. Taking the form of a blue goat, the Fairy warns Pinocchio of the impending arrival of The Terrible Dogfish, but is unsuccessful. It is revealed in chapter XXXVI that she gives a house to the Talking Cricket (who offers to accommodate both Pinocchio and the sickly Geppetto) while she was in the form of the goat. The Fairy becomes ill too, so Pinocchio gives some of the money he has earned to her snail to give to her.

She finally appears to Pinocchio in a dream, gives the boy a kiss, and commends him for having taken care of his ailing father and herself. Upon awakening, Pinocchio has become human, and all his copper coins have turned to gold, accompanied by a note from the Fairy professing her responsibility.

== In other media ==
=== Disney ===
- In the Walt Disney Animation Studios film Pinocchio (1940), the Fairy (voiced by Evelyn Venable) is referred to as the Blue Fairy. She is depicted with blonde hair and blue eyes, rather than the turquoise hair and black eyes of her book counterpart. In this case, the "blue" in her name refers to the color of her eyes and gown. The Blue Fairy is the one who brings Pinocchio to life after Geppetto wished that he was a real boy.
- The Blue Fairy appears in Disney's Villains' Revenge, voiced by Rosalyn Landor.
- The Blue Fairy appears in Geppetto, portrayed by Julia Louis-Dreyfus.
- The Blue Fairy makes occasional appearances in House of Mouse as a guest of the eponymous club, voiced again by Rosalyn Landor.
- The Blue Fairy appears in Teacher's Pet, voiced again by Rosalyn Landor. She helps Spot Helperman realize his dreams of posing as a human boy.
- The Blue Fairy appears in Kingdom Hearts 3D: Dream Drop Distance, voiced by Miyuki Ichijo in the Japanese version and again by Rosalyn Landor in the English dub. Just like the film, the Blue Fairy explains to Pinocchio about the side effects of his lies to Jiminy Cricket. She later tells Sora that Geppetto was swallowed by Monstro and that Pinocchio and Jiminy went to go rescue him.
- The Blue Fairy appears in The Wonderful World of Mickey Mouse episode "Disappearing Act", voiced by Grey DeLisle.
- The Blue Fairy appears in Pinocchio (2022), portrayed by Cynthia Erivo.
- The Blue Fairy is the main character in the prequel novel When You Wish Upon a Star written by Elizabeth Lim and published on April 4, 2023 as part of Disney's A Twisted Tale anthology series. The story details her origins as Chiara Belmagio, a baker's eldest daughter and philanthropist in the small Italian town of Pariva; her complex relationship with her narcissistic younger sister Ilaria; and her eventual transformation into a fairy.

=== Other appearances ===
The Fairy with Turquoise Hair, as portrayed in Giuliano Cenci's 1972 film The Adventures of Pinocchio

In Giuliano Cenci's 1972 animated film The Adventures of Pinocchio, the Fairy (voiced by Vittoria Febbi in Italian and by Martha Scott in the English dub) is portrayed much more accurately to the book than she is in the Disney adaptation. She has no role in creating Pinocchio, though she does offer him guidance and support.

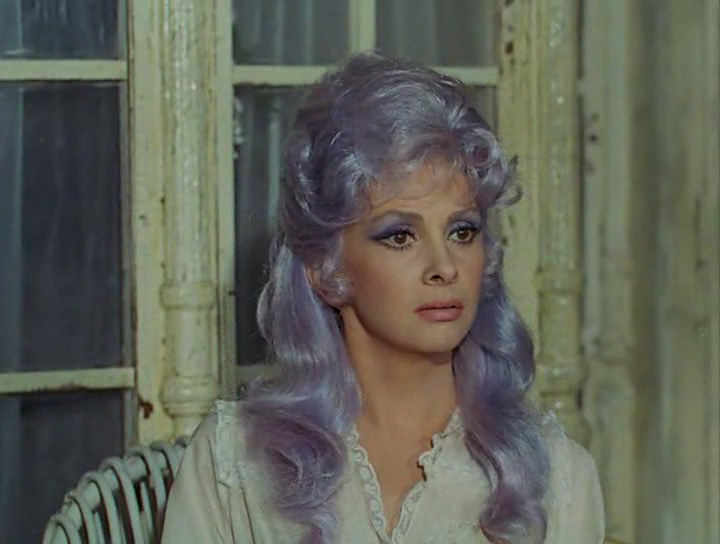
Gina Lollobrigida as The Fairy with Turquoise Hair in the TV series The Adventures of Pinocchio (1972)

In 1972's Italian miniseries The Adventures of Pinocchio, she is played by Gina Lollobrigida. This version is the ghost of Geppetto's deceased wife.

The Fairy appears in Saban's The Adventures of Pinocchio, voiced by Masako Ikeda. She is referred to as the Oak Fairy and is a resident of the oak tree from which Pinocchio was created. She acts as Pinocchio's guidance and offers advice to help Pinocchio when he is in a difficult situation. In the last episode, Oak Fairy, proud of dead Pinocchio's courage and kindness, brings him back to life as a real boy. After this, the fairy leaves him, saying that from now on he must take care of himself. Pinocchio calls her his godmother.

In Piccolino no Bōken, the role of Fairy is the same like in the book although she does not physically age and stays as a young woman. She acts as a motherly figure and teacher to Pinocchio and gets to rescue him from harm several times. After Pinocchio finds her tombstone instead of her house she appears later in different forms including a giant pigeon. Eventually, as a reward to Pinocchio's good deeds, the fairy decides to transform him into a real boy.

In the 1987 film Pinocchio and the Emperor of the Night, the Good Fairy (voiced by Rickie Lee Jones) appears as Pinocchio's guide. In the beginning she arrives at his birthday party and brings to life his glowworm, which he names Gee Willikers. Later, she brings him back to life after he has been turned back into a puppet by Puppetino and tells him to make the right choices. After the defeat of the Emperor, she restores Pinocchio, brings back Geppetto's jewel box which had been stolen earlier, and brings Twinkle, a girl who had been turned into a puppet, back to life.

In the 1992 direct-to-video adaptation by GoodTimes Entertainment, the character (voiced by Jeannie Elias) is portrayed more like her Disney counterpart, being named Blue Fairy, and with blonde hair instead of turquoise. She is soft-spoken and sweet. The Blue Fairy is also a motherly figure to Pinocchio and guides him. She also has a broken heart when she realizes that Pinocchio is swallowed by a whale, but Pinocchio becomes good and repays her kindness by doing the good things.

In the 1996 film The Adventures of Pinocchio, the character of Leona (played by Geneviève Bujold) serves as the Fairy's stand-in in the film. She is a beloved and long-time friend of Geppetto with whom he is secretly in love - a love which is actually mutual, despite her having previously married his late brother (similar to the 1972's Italian miniseries of a similar name).

In Happily Ever After: Fairy Tales for Every Child, the Fairy is called the "Blues Fairy" (voiced by Della Reese) and is like her Disney counterpart who tells Pinocchio, aka Pinoak, what is right and what is wrong.

In A.I.: Artificial Intelligence (2001), named as Blue Fairy (voiced by Meryl Streep), appears as a plot MacGuffin. The main character David, a robotic child, believes that the Blue Fairy has the power to turn him into a real boy. It also appears in the form of the Coney Island statue of the Blue Fairy which David mistakes for a real blue fairy.

In the 1936 Soviet book adaptation The Golden Key, or the Adventures of Buratino by Aleksey Nikolayevich Tolstoy, there is a female character with blue hair named Malvina. She is a curly-haired doll from the puppet theater of Karabas Barabas (Mangiafuoco), with a porcelain head and a cotton-stuffed body. She escapes the cruel theater director and flees into the forest, where she lives until encountering Buratino. The animals, birds, and insects of the forest care for her due to her well-mannered and gentle nature. Her primary companions are her poodle servant Artemon, and Pierrot, a lovesick puppet poet infatuated with her. In addition to sharing traits with the Fairy, Malvina's character also embodies elements of Columbina from the commedia dell'arte tradition. Notably, Tolstoy likely used Malvina as a satirical depiction of prominent Moscow theater actresses of the 1920s and 1930s, including Olga Knipper-Chekhova, Maria Andreyeva, and Maria Babanova. In the 1975 live-action adaptation, Malvina was played by Tanya Protsenko, while in the 2026 remake she was portrayed by Anastasiya Talyzina.

In Roberto Benigni's Pinocchio, the Fairy with Turquoise Hair (in the english dub being named Blue Fairy) is portrayed by Nicoletta Braschi, with her English-dubbed voice provided by Glenn Close.

In Pinocchio and Friends, the Fairy with Turquoise Hair is the teacher Pinocchio and Freeda. He lives in the Magical Forest with his dog and his housekeeper. She has a very giggly, bubbly and sensitive personality.

Angelica the Blue Fairy is the antagonist in the Japanese/Australian stage show Once Upon a Midnight.

The Blue Fairy was a 1950s' children's program on WGN-TV in Chicago, hosted by Brigid Bazlen as the fairy.

In a 1997 article for the Miami New Times, reporter Lynda Edwards describes hearing modern urban legends from Miami's homeless children, who cope with their situation by invoking Latino and Afro-Cuban legends including the image of "the pale blue lady" or blue fairy. Derived from the Catholic legend of the Blessed Mother leading a spiritual army of angels, the Blue Lady protects the children from poverty-related terrors, against the minions of a vengeful La Llorona.

In Alberto Sironi's 2008 miniseries, the Fairy is portrayed by Violante Placido. She rescues Pinocchio from being murdered by the Fox and the Cat in a dark forest and nurses him back to health. She warns him that he must be good and to not run astray in the future, otherwise both her heart and Gepetto's will break in disappointment. She also states that because their hearts are not made of wood there would be no magic capable of mending them if it happened.

In the 2012 Italian animated film Pinocchio, the Fairy seems as young as Pinocchio and shows a sense of humour. As on many versions, she forgives him and encourages him to do good. She restores him from his donkey form to puppet form, and also turns him to a real boy for risking his life for Gepetto.

In the Vertigo comic series Fables, she appears as a blue-haired fairy who makes Pinocchio into a (never-aging) boy.

Actress Keegan Connor Tracy plays the Blue Fairy in ABC's Once Upon a Time, like other characters in the series, taking elements from her Disney counterpart. In the series, the residents of Storybrooke, Maine are former fairytale characters with their memories wiped by a curse cast by the Evil Queen from the tale of Snow White. The good fairies from the fairytale world are transformed into the nuns of Storybrooke's local convent, with the Blue Fairy as Mother Superior. Her history with Pinocchio is still intact, but is also shown to have histories with Tinker Bell, Tiger Lily, and Fiona the Black Fairy.

In the live-action Italian film Pinocchio (2019), co-written, directed and co-produced by Matteo Garrone, the Fairy is portrayed by Alida Baldari Calabria as a child and Marine Vacth (dubbed by Domitilla D'Amico) as an adult. In the English version, Baldari Calabria dubbed herself, while Vacth was dubbed again by D'Amico.

In Guillermo del Toro's Pinocchio, the Fairy with Turquoise Hair is rewritten as the character of the Wood Sprite (voiced by Tilda Swinton), a blue hairless humanoid with eight wings and a feathered snake-like tail. The Wood Sprite also has a sister named Death (also voiced by Swinton).

In Lies of P, the Fairy appears as a character named Sophia who appears in the central hub of the game to help players level up and provides crucial information about the game world and plot.

The sci-fi/fantasy anthology Once Upon a Future Time Volume 4 includes a short story, "The Blue Fairy," in which a woman with blue hair is accused of illegally creating androids.

In the horror adaptation Pinocchio Unstrung, the Fairy is reimagined as the "Wood Mother" (voiced by Emma Tate), a failed wooden creation of Geppetto attached to a door in his basement. She, alongside the Cricket, manipulates Pinocchio into committing gruesome and vile deeds, stealing the body parts of people to make himself a "real boy."
