= The Adventures of Pinocchio (1972 film) =

- Original Italian quad
- Un burattino di nome Pinocchio
- Directed by: Giuliano Cenci
- Written by: Giuliano Cenci
- Based on: The Adventures of Pinocchio by Carlo Collodi
- Produced by: Giuliano Cenci; Renato Rascel
- Starring: Renato Rascel; Roberta Paladini; Lauro Gazzolo
- Narrated by: Renato Rascel
- Cinematography: Renzo Cenci
- Edited by: Giuliano Cenci; Renzo Cenci
- Music by: Vito Di Tommaso; Renato Rascel
- Production company: Cartoons Cinematografica Italiana
- Distributed by: Artfilm Distribuzione
- Release date: 21 December 1972
- Running time: 93 minutes
- Country: Italy
- Language: Italian

The Adventures of Pinocchio (Italian: Un burattino di nome Pinocchio, literally A puppet named Pinocchio) is a 1972 Italian animated fantasy film produced by Cartoons Cinematografica Italiana. An adaptation of Carlo Collodi's 1883 book The Adventures of Pinocchio, it is written, produced, directed and edited by Giuliano Cenci. The English dub was released in the United States by G.G. Communications in October of 1978.

== Plot ==
Geppetto, a woodcarver, crafts a puppet named Pinocchio to earn a living as a touring entertainer. While carving him, he discovers that the puppet is alive. Once finished, Pinocchio dashes out of Geppetto's home into the village. Geppetto catches and reprimands him, but bystanders mistake this for abuse and Geppetto is arrested. Alone at home, Pinocchio meets a talking cricket, who annoys him with his moralizing and is killed when Pinocchio hurls a hammer at him. Pinocchio goes hungry in Geppetto's absence and burns his feet off in a brazier. Geppetto is released the next day, forgives the suffering Pinocchio, repairs his feet, and clothes him. Pinocchio vows to attend school and become a model son; Geppetto sells his coat to buy a spelling book. En route to school, Pinocchio hears music from a nearby puppet theatre and sells his spelling book to afford admission. The puppets onstage recognize Pinocchio as kin, disrupting the show. The angry Mangiafuoco prepares to use Pinocchio as firewood, but softens at his pleas and self-sacrifice for another puppet, giving him five gold pieces for Geppetto. On the way home, a fox and a cat dupe Pinocchio into believing he can multiply his coins in the "Field of Miracles". They dine at an inn, trick Pinocchio into paying, and slip away, instructing the innkeeper to direct Pinocchio to the Field of Miracles at dawn.

Searching for the Field, Pinocchio meets the cricket's ghost, who futilely urges him homeward. The disguised fox and cat ambush Pinocchio, but he escapes to a large house owned by a fairy with dark blue hair. The fairy refuses entry as punishment, allowing his capture; the fox and cat hang him from a tree and leave him there. The fairy later pities him, frees him, and nurses him back to health. She offers a home and invites Geppetto. As Pinocchio sets out to find Geppetto, the fox and cat reappear and lure him to the Field. He buries the coins and waits for growth, only for the fox and cat to steal them. Pinocchio discovers this trick and a parrot mocks his gullibility. Discouraged after further misadventures, Pinocchio seeks the fairy's forgiveness, but finds her tombstone. A giant dove carries him to the sea, where Geppetto searches for him in a storm. Pinocchio dives in but washes up on the Island of Busy Bees, reuniting with the fairy. Pinocchio yearns to become a real boy, and the fairy promises it if he reforms. Pinocchio excels in school but quarrels with a classmate and flees the police bulldog Alidoro, later saving him from drowning. Alidoro repays the favor by rescuing Pinocchio from the Green Fisherman.

Pleased, the fairy decides to transform Pinocchio after a planned party. However, Pinocchio's friend Lucignolo tempts him to Toyland, where play reigns without work or study. They revel for four months until they transform into donkeys and are sold in the marketplace; Lucignolo is sold to a farmer, and Pinocchio is sold to a circus. Lamed in an accident, Pinocchio is sold to a drum-maker who drowns him for skin. Underwater, the fairy restores Pinocchio as a puppet. He swims free, but is swallowed by a sea monster, in which Geppetto resides. The two escape and search for a new home. They encounter the destitute and invalid fox and cat, but Pinocchio is unsympathetic to their plight and abandons them. Pinocchio and Geppetto reach a cottage owned by the revived talking cricket, who grants shelter. Pinocchio works for a farmer replacing a dying donkey; Pinocchio recognizes the donkey as Lucignolo and comforts him in his final moment. He later weaves baskets, supporting Geppetto comfortably. Exhausted one evening, Pinocchio dreams of the fairy's praise. He awakens as a real boy in a grand house, with Geppetto rejuvenated.

== Cast ==
=== Original Italian version ===
Renato Rascel was chosen to serve as both the singer of the introductory song and as the narrator. He was permitted to occasionally ad lib in order to get the film's message across, and to give it a truly Italian feel.

- Renato Rascel as the Narrator
- Roberta Paladini as Pinocchio
- Roberto Bertea as Geppetto
- Manlio De Angelis as The Cat (Il Gatto)
- Vittoria Febbi as the Blue Fairy (La Fata Turchina)
- Michele Gammino as Mangiafuoco
- Lauro Gazzolo as the Talking Cricket (Il Grillo Parlante)
- Flaminia Jandolo as Lucignolo
- Sergio Tedesco as The Fox (La Volpe)
- Gianni Bonagura as the Coachman (L'Omino)
- Arturo Dominici as the Green Fisherman (Il Pescatore Verde)
- Gianfranco Bellini as the pigeon (Il Colombo)

=== English-dubbed version ===
In 1978, an English-dubbed version was released in the US by G.G. Communications directed by Jesse Vogel. It used an uncredited cast of British actors. The English dub debuted on VHS and Betamax on 15 July 1978, distributed by Video Gems. G. G. Communications later gave it a theatrical release in October 1978. The film was later re-released on VHS by Starmaker Entertainment in 1989.

== Production ==
=== Development ===
The film was directed by Giuliano Cenci with assistance from his brother Renzo. During production, Carlo Collodi's grandchildren Mario and Antonio Lorenzini were consulted. The subtle movements made by fidgeting children whilst speaking or under scrutiny were incorporated into Pinocchio's movements, particularly when he lies to the Fairy with the Turquoise Hair over the fate of his gold coins. For the design of the Fairy, Italian portrayals of the Blessed Virgin Mary in art were used as starting points.

=== Design ===
For the design of Pinocchio, the animators took inspiration from illustrations made by Attilio Mussino. The backgrounds were painted by Sicilian artist Alberto D'Angelo and Abramo Scortecci who both used tone styles evocative of early 20th-century Italian art with little focus on surrealism as in the Disney adaptation.

== See also ==
- List of animated feature-length films
