= The Fox and the Cat =

Fictional characters

- The Adventures of Pinocchio characters
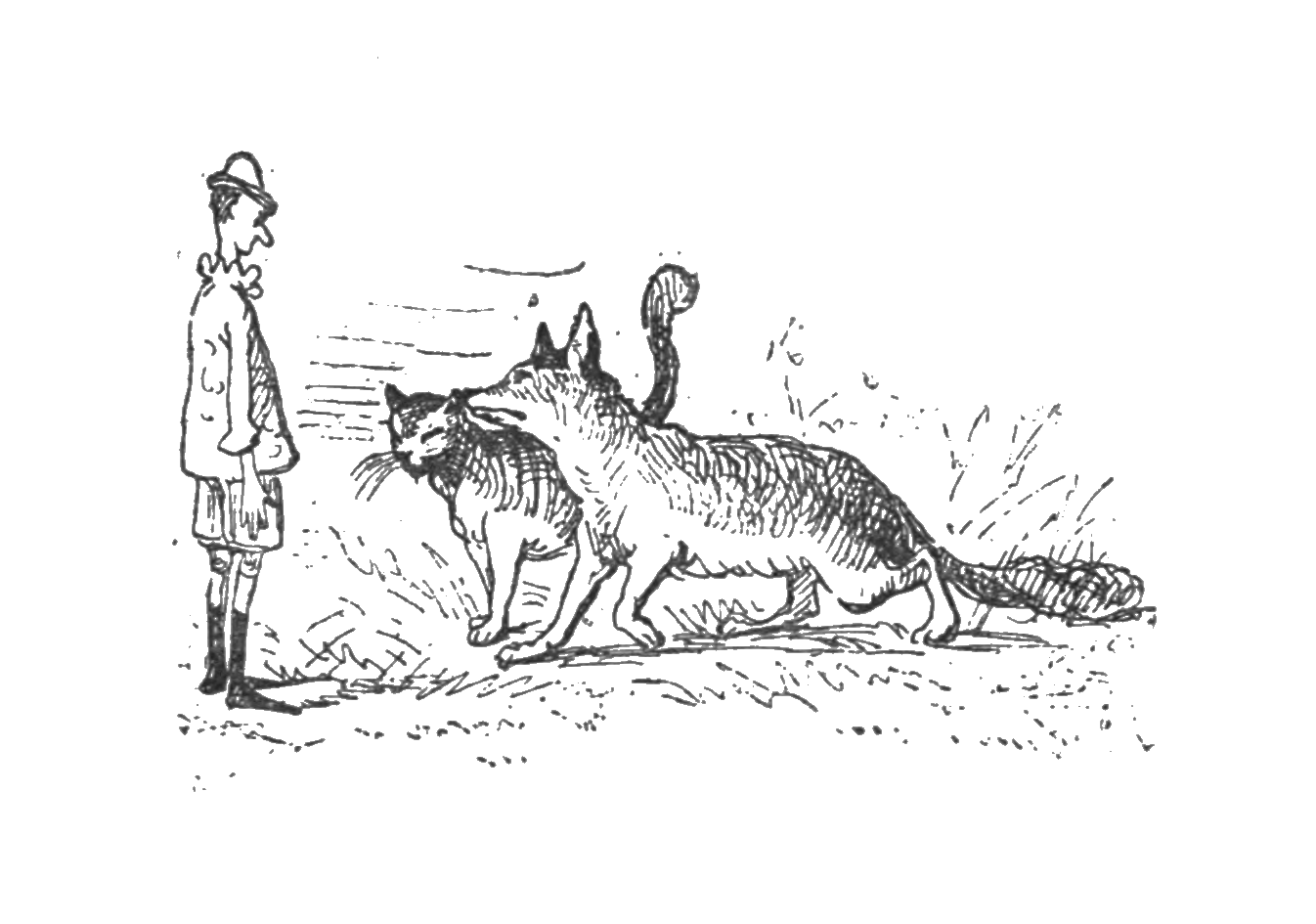
- The Fox and the Cat as drawn by Enrico Mazzanti
- First appearance: The Adventures of Pinocchio
- Created by: Carlo Collodi

In-universe information
- Species: Fox (The Fox); Cat (The Cat)
- Gender: Male
- Occupation: Con artists
- Nationality: Italian

The Fox and the Cat (Italian: il Gatto e la Volpe, lit. 'the Cat and the Fox') are a pair of fictional characters and the main antagonists of Italian writer Carlo Collodi's 1883 book Le avventure di Pinocchio (The Adventures of Pinocchio). They are depicted as poor con artists who hoodwink Pinocchio and attempt to murder him. They pretend to be disabled: the Fox lame and the Cat blind. The Fox appears to be more intelligent than the Cat, who usually limits himself to repeating the Fox's words.

== Role in the book ==
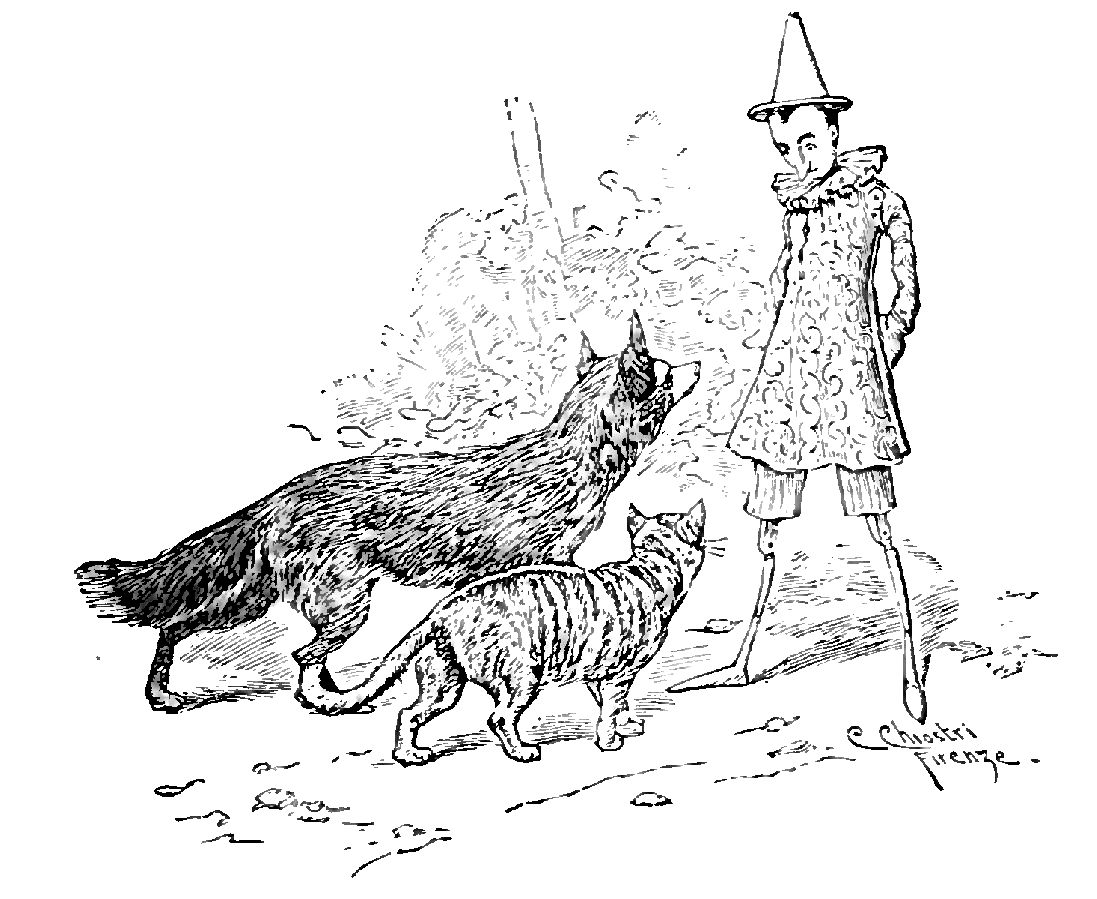
The Fox and the Cat illustrated by Carlo Chiostri

Pinocchio encounters the two after leaving Mangiafuoco's theatre with five gold sequins, whereupon the Fox claims to know Pinocchio's father Mister Geppetto and proposes to Pinocchio to visit the Land of Barn Owls (Paese dei Barbagianni) and thence to a 'Field of Miracles' (Il campo dei Miracoli), where coins can be grown into a money-producing tree. A white blackbird warns Pinocchio against these lies, but is eaten by the Cat. The Fox covers up this action by claiming that the blackbird talks too much. The pair lead Pinocchio to the Red Crayfish Inn (Osteria del Gambero Rosso), where they eat a large meal and ask to be awoken at midnight.

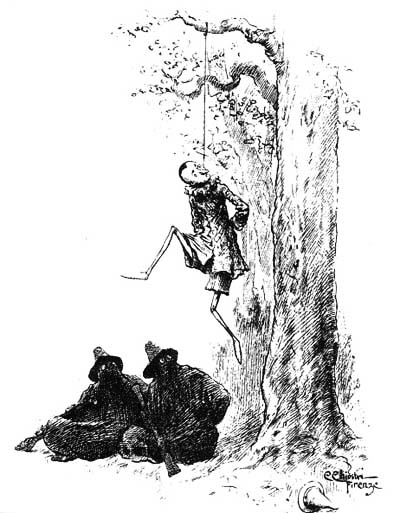
The Fox and the Cat, dressed as bandits, hang Pinocchio.

Two hours before the set time, the pair abandon Pinocchio to pay for the meal with one of his sequins, and have the innkeeper leave a message for Pinocchio that the Cat's eldest kitten had fallen ill, and that they would meet Pinocchio at the Field of Miracles later. When Pinocchio leaves the inn, the two attack him in the guise of bandits and in the ensuing struggle, Pinocchio bites off the Cat's paw. The bandits then hang Pinocchio from a tree, which he escapes with the assistance of The Fairy with Turquoise Hair, who enlisted a falcon to cut him down.

The next day, Pinocchio encounters the pair again, unaware they are the bandits who tried to hang him. When Pinocchio notices the Cat's paw in a sling, the Fox claims that the Cat cut it off to feed a starving wolf. They lead Pinocchio to the town of Catchfools (Acchiappacitrulli), where the coins are soon buried. In Pinocchio's absence, the pair dig up the sequins and escape. Pinocchio learns of this from a parrot, who mocks him for falling for their tricks.

Near the end of the book, Pinocchio encounters the Fox and the Cat again when looking for a place for Geppetto to recover. But this time, the pair have become impoverished, whereas the Fox is now truly lame, nearly hairless, and tailless (the Fox had to chop off his own tail because he sold it to buy food), and the Cat became truly blind. They plead for food or money, but are rebuffed by Pinocchio while stating that their misfortunes have served them right for their wickedness. He then leaves, all the while saying goodbye to his "false friends".

== Portrayals in popular culture ==
=== Honest John and Gideon (Disney) ===
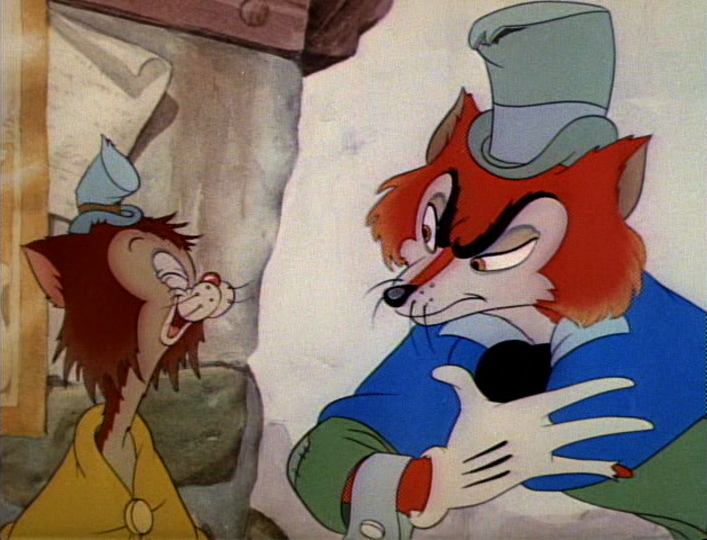
Honest John (right) and Gideon (left), as portrayed in Disney's Pinocchio

In the 1940 Disney film Pinocchio, the Fox and the Cat are given the names J. Worthington Foulfellow (or "Honest John"; voiced by Walter Catlett) and Gideon (or "Giddy"; whose hiccups were provided by Mel Blanc and whose mute comic hijinks were modeled on Harpo Marx, the silent member of The Marx Brothers). While the name Worthington Foulfellow appears in promotional materials, it is never spoken in the film. The pair differ from the original characters in a number of ways as they are still poor, but they do not feign disability and they persuade Pinocchio to join Stromboli's (the film's counterpart to Mangiafuoco) puppet show instead of Pinocchio discovering it himself as well as go to Pleasure Island, upon being hired to do so by the Coachman. They also do not attempt to murder Pinocchio, although Honest John suggests to the Coachman in one scene that they would be willing to murder if required as part of a job with much more money than usual involved in it. The Field of Miracles subplot is also absent from the film. Honest John is portrayed as an eccentric ham actor who appears to be illiterate (as evidenced by one scene where he "reads" Pinocchio's schoolbook upside down), whereas Gideon is portrayed as a foolish mute who frequently gets Honest John into trouble by accident. Apart from three hiccups, Gideon is mute throughout the film. A draft script of the film had Honest John and Gideon being arrested onscreen by the police after encountering Pinocchio a third time, but this scene was written out of the film's final draft for unknown reasons, presumably for pace and/or costs. However, at some point Geppetto learned of Pinocchio being on Pleasure Island and sailed in search for Pinocchio on said island before being swallowed by Monstro the whale, and the only people who could know about it were Honest John & Gideon and probably a number of villagers who heard the not so smart fox singing loudly the song of the infamous and illegal Pleasure Island in town in late evening while taking Pinocchio to the Coachman at the crossroads, despite Honest John being clearly terrified of being caught by "the law" while doing any business involving Pleasure Island, so this may imply that the two were arrested offscreen (or at the very least running from the law) while Pinocchio was on Pleasure Island. Alternatively, Pinocchio escaped from Pleasure Island, the only boy who made it, and this was the biggest fear of Honest John in the scene of the Red Lobster Inn when he mentioned "the law", so it is possible that they have been arrested offscreen afterwards because of that. The characters were considered to be used again in the Disney film Fun and Fancy Free (1947) as the owners of the Magic Beans that Mickey Mouse acquires in exchange for his cow, but the idea was dropped.

In the video game based on Pinocchio, Honest John and Gideon appear as enemies during the first stage. The duo were also planned to make an appearance in the RPG video game Kingdom Hearts 358/2 Days (2009) but were cut for space restrictions.

In the Disney book Pinocchio's Promise, Honest John and Gideon see Pinocchio walking into town to give a cuckoo clock to Geppetto's friend Mrs. Romano, whereupon he is diverted to a circus. Honest John attempts to sell the clock elsewhere while Gideon takes Pinocchio to the circus with two expired tickets but abandons him when the latter is scolded by the admission attendant. After Pinocchio leaves the circus and reports Honest John's trickery to the local police, Honest John is then chased by the police officer and Pinocchio gives the clock to Mrs. Romano.

In a Disney book adaption of The Emperor's New Clothes, Honest John and Gideon - posing as tailors - trick the emperor (portrayed in the same book by Prince John).

Honest John and Gideon also appear in the fifth installment of the book series Kingdom Keepers. They are featured as members of the Disney Villains legion, known as the Overtakers, and battle Finn in chapter six of Shell Game.

The video game Disney Twisted-Wonderland includes two characters named Ernesto Foulworth and Gino, inspired by them, who are humans with animal features like theirs, and wearing similar clothes. Honest John is a playable character in the mobile game Disney Magic Kingdoms.

Honest John and Gideon appear in Disney's 2022 live-action/CGI remake of Pinocchio, in which the former is voiced by Keegan-Michael Key. Just like the film, Honest John and Gideon give Pinocchio to Stromboli even after trapping Jiminy Cricket in a cup. They aren't seen again after that.

=== In other media ===
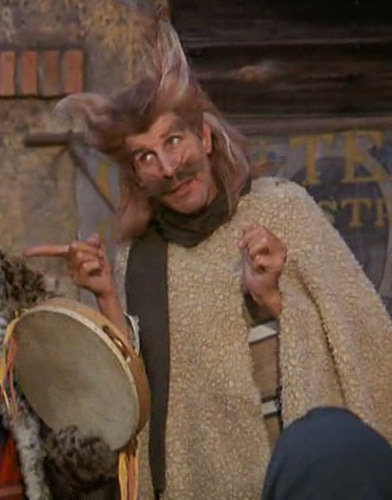
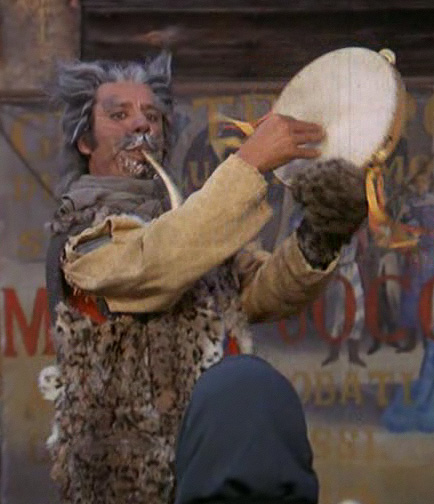
Ciccio Ingrassia as the Fox and Franco Franchi as the Cat in The Adventures of Pinocchio (1972)
- In the 1936 Soviet book adaptation The Golden Key, or the Adventures of Buratino by Aleksey Nikolayevich Tolstoy, they are named Alice the Fox and Basilio the Cat. In the 1959 animated adaptation of the book they are voiced by Elena Ponsova and Vladimir Lepko, respectively, in the original version. In the 1975 live-action adaptation, they are played by Elena Sanayeva and Rolan Bykov, while in the 2026 remake they are portrayed by Viktoriya Isakova and Alexander Petrov.
- In the 1947 Italian live action film Le avventure di Pinocchio, the Fox and the Cat are portrayed by Angelo Taddeoli and Pietro Tommei.
- They are featured in the 1976 anime series Piccolino no Bōken.
- In the 1960–61 television adaptation by Rankin/Bass Productions, The New Adventures of Pinocchio, the Fox and the Cat were named Foxy Q. Fibble and Cool S. Cat, and are voiced by Larry D. Mann and Paul Kligman.
- The Fox and the Cat appeared in the 1972 miniseries The Adventures of Pinocchio, portrayed by Franco and Ciccio. They are depicted as humans who work as comedians for Mangiafuoco, wearing makeup as a fox and a cat. They are later fired and try to steal Pinocchio's coins.

The Fox and the Cat, as portrayed in Giuliano Cenci's film The Adventures of Pinocchio (1972)

- In the 1972 animated film The Adventures of Pinocchio (directed by Giuliano Cenci), the Fox and the Cat (voiced by Sergio Tedesco and Manlio De Angelis in the Italian version, and by Alan Sues and Don Messick in the English dub) follow the characterization shown in the book: the pair pretend to be physically disabled, and tempt Pinocchio to the Field of Miracles. As in the book, the Fox is the more articulate of the two, and the pair attempt to murder Pinocchio for his coins, though the Cat does not lose his paw as his book counterpart does. At the end of the film, the two are impoverished, though the Fox does not lose his tail nor any of his fur as in the book.
- In Pinocchio: The Series (1972), the Fox is named Jack while the cat is replaced with a weasel named Willie.
- The Fox and the Cat are the primary antagonists of another Rankin/Bass adaptation, Pinocchio's Christmas (1980), voiced by Allen Swift (who was impersonating Claude Rains) and Pat Bright. They had previously made "friends" with Pinocchio and taught him many of his bad habits. They do not feign disability and the Cat is a female. While they did a trick similar to the Field of Miracles to Pinocchio which involved a Christmas tree growing at sunset from some coins, they just said that the tree failed to grow. The Fox and the Cat try to sell Pinocchio to a sleigh driver who works for a rich duke who will give Pinocchio to his children. When Lady Azora looks into Pinocchio's future and mentions that he will be led astray on his path to becoming a real boy, Pinocchio catches a glimpse of the Fox and the Cat waving at him through the window.
- In the 1987 animated film Pinocchio and the Emperor of the Night (which serves as a sequel to the Pinocchio story), Pinocchio encounters a pair of shady animal characters very similar to the Fox and the Cat: a large raccoon named Sylvester J. Scalawag (voiced by Ed Asner) and a monkey named Igor (voiced by Frank Welker). Like the characters from the original story, Scalawag and Igor are depicted as con men who manage to dupe Pinocchio twice during the first half of the film. However, they reform as his allies after Pinocchio saves them from a giant barracuda. After a long adventure wherein Pinocchio, Scalawag, and Igor learn the hard way not to succumb to their selfish desires without thinking of the consequences, Pinocchio allows the pair to come with him and his father as they return home at the end of the film.
- In the 1992 direct to video adaptation entitled Pinocchio from GoodTimes Entertainment, the Fox is replaced with a Wolf, the Cat speaks like a beatnik, and both are voiced by Cam Clarke. The two of them target Pinocchio's gold coins and do not attempt to kill Pinocchio. Near the film's conclusion, the Wolf and the Cat are arrested by a police officer when Pinocchio sees them in a passing paddy wagon. They beg Pinocchio to vouch for them whereupon Pinocchio tells the police officer that they stole his coins. The police officer then drives the paddy wagon away stating that what they did to Pinocchio will result in a long prison sentence.
- In the 1996 live action film The Adventures of Pinocchio (directed by Steve Barron), the Fox and the Cat (portrayed by Rob Schneider and Bebe Neuwirth, respectively) are named Volpe ('fox' in Italian) and Felinet, and are portrayed as humans in league with Mangiafuoco (named Lorenzini, in this adaptation). In a reversal of roles, Felinet is female and takes on the more dominant role while Volpe is a bungling sidekick. They appear at their first encounter with Pinocchio, whom Geppetto takes away while telling Volpe and Felinet that Pinocchio will only play with his own sort. Volpe and Felinet later witness Pinocchio causing mischievous havoc in a bakery, even when the police arrive. As in the novel, the pair trick Pinocchio into giving up his coins by taking him to the Field of Miracles (depicted near a monastery), where they steal the money. In conclusion, they are tricked by Pinocchio into drinking cursed water (where Pinocchio claims that the water will enable them to turn white stones into gold) which transforms them into a real fox and cat off-screen. They are shown to have been captured by a farmer and kept as pets, where they later witness Pinocchio in town. When Volpe quotes "Don't you just hate that kid", Felinet quotes "Not as much as I hate you".
  - In The New Adventures of Pinocchio (the sequel to The Adventures of Pinocchio), Volpe and Felinet (portrayed by Simon Schatzberger and Sarah Alexander respectively) are owned by a circus run by Lorenzini's widow Madame Flambeau (who was actually Lorenzini in disguise) where they are shown in humanoid forms which they still blame Pinocchio for. The two of them lead Pinocchio and Lampwick to Madame Flambeau to purchase her elixir which turns Pinocchio and Geppetto into puppets and also turns Lampwick into a donkeyfish. While Pepe the Cricket in the form of the Dwarf Showman makes off with Pinocchio, Volpe and Felinet make off with Geppetto's puppet form. In conclusion, they try and fail to restore their human forms in the water that restored Pinocchio and Geppetto while also turning Lorenzini into a humanoid sea monster. When Geppetto gains ownership of the circus, Volpe and Felinet are shown doing the tango.
- The Fox and the Cat were featured in the Happily Ever After: Fairy Tales for Every Child version of Pinocchio, where they were referred to as Redd Foxx (voiced by Barry Douglas) and Sporty the Cat (voiced by Franklyn Ajaye).
- The Fox and the Cat were also featured in the 2002 film Pinocchio, where they were played by comedy duo Fichi d'India (Bruno Arena and Max Cavallari) in the Italian version, and their English-dubbed voices were provided by Cheech Marin and Eddie Griffin. Like some of the animal characters depicted in this film, here they are depicted as humans while sporting pointy ears and fangs. They trick Pinocchio into planting his coins in the Meadow of Miracles outside of Grabadimwit, but are not seen again after seizing Pinocchio's coins.
- In Pinocchio 3000, the characters Cab and Rodo (voiced by Matt Holland and Jack Daniel Wells) are two robots, based on the Fox and the Cat; they are owned by Mayor Scamboni's daughter Marlene.
- The Fox and the Cat appear in the 2008 miniseries Pinocchio, portrayed by Toni Bertorelli and Francesco Pannofino.
- In the ABC series Once Upon a Time, the characters Martin and Myrna (portrayed by Harry Groener and Carolyn Hennesy) are the parents of Jiminy and work as con artists, in allusion to the Fox and the Cat. Characters Emma and Graham also stroll past a store called Worthington's Haberdashery, a probable reference to Honest John's full name, John Worthington Foulfellow.
- The Fox and the Cat appear in the 2012 film Pinocchio, voiced by Mariccia Affiato and Maurizio Micheli in the Italian version, and by Sonja Ball and Thor Bishopric in the Canadian English dub. In this version, the Fox is female and the Cat is male, which is a great reversal from the book. In the American release (2018), they are renamed Trixie the Fox and Leo the Cat (voiced by Ambyr Childers and Jon Heder respectively). Both of them are shown to be workers of Mangiafuoco. When it comes to their attempt to steal the coins from Pinocchio when disguised as bandits, the Cat's paw just gets injured. They aren't seen again after seizing Pinocchio's coins.
- The Fox and the Cat appear in the 2019 film Pinocchio, portrayed by Massimo Ceccherini and Rocco Papaleo, while their English dub voices are provided by Luigi Scribani and Vladimiro Conti. Like the 2002 film, they are depicted as humans while sporting pointy ears, fangs, and claws. At the end of the film, they are badly reduced and no longer falsely disabled.
- In the 2021 Pixar film Luca, Pinocchio with the Fox and the Cat make a brief appearance during a fantasy sequence where Giulia shows the title character several books, since Luca takes place in Italy. Also, the film's soundtrack features the song "Il gatto e la volpe", which is about the Cat and the Fox.
- The Fox, Mangiafuoco, and the Ringmaster are merged into a single human character named Count Volpe in the 2022 stop-motion Netflix film Pinocchio voiced by Christoph Waltz. Count Volpe is a disgraced aristocrat with flaring sideburns resembling a fox's ears and a tricked walking stick with a fox's head who has become a traveling puppeteer that uses a monkey named Spazzatura (name that literally means "trash" or "garbage") as an assistant puppeteer and voiced by Cate Blanchett.
- The video game Lies of P, loosely based on Collodi's novel, includes the characters Black Cat and Red Fox, a brother and sister duo wearing animal masks matching their nicknames. They are originally friendly towards protagonist Pinocchio, although, as their novel counterparts, they are deceitful. Depending on the player's actions, they can later turn antagonists and die at Pinocchio's hand, or take a neutral stance towards him and survive the events of the game. Optional background reveals that the two are not actually siblings, and their real names to be Lucio and Claudia Volfe.

== Notes ==
The "Field of Miracles" is often mistaken for the poetic phrase Square of the Miracles, used since the second half of the 20th century to describe the Piazza del Duomo of Pisa. The monuments of the famous square were called miracles by Gabriele D'Annunzio in his book Forse che sì forse che no (1910). Due to several famous squares in Italy being called campo, and the story of Pinocchio being widespread in the world, many people—in and outside Italy—tend to confuse the two.

== Bibliography ==
- Carlo Collodi, Le Avventure di Pinocchio 1883, RCS MediaGroup
