= Once Upon a Time (1973 film) =

- German theatrical release poster
- Directed by: Roberto Gavioli; Rolf Kauka
- Written by: Roberto Gavioli; Rolf Kauka
- Based on: Frau Holle by The Brothers Grimm
- Dialogs, lyrics: Roberto de Leonardis
- Produced by: Rolf Kauka
- Music by: Peter Thomas
- Distributed by: Constantin Film (West Germany)
- Release dates: 12 December 1973 (West Germany); 2 April 1976 (United States)
- Running time: 78 minutes
- Countries: Italy; West Germany
- Language: Italian / German

Once Upon a Time (German: Maria d'Oro und Bello Blue) is a 1973 West German-Italian animated musical film written and directed by Roberto Gavioli and Rolf Kauka. The story is based on the German fairytale Mother Hulda.

== Plot ==
Beautiful and kind-hearted Maria is the daughter of wealthy widower Mr. Bottle. Their lives are changed when Mary-Lou and her gypsy con artist mother arrive in town. Mary-Lou's mother tells fake fortunes for money and meets Mr. Bottle, noticing that he's wealthy. She cons him into marrying her, saying that great misfortune will befall him if he doesn't. Mary-Lou and her mother torment Maria by treating her like a servant, and Maria's father is helpless to stop them.

One day during a royal hunt, the Prince of the kingdom is separated from his hunting party when he chases after a white stag. He loses the stag but stumbles upon Mary-Lou bathing in the woods and viciously chastising Maria, who is waiting on her. When Mary-Lou goes away to change, the Prince approaches the crying Maria and comforts her. Mary-Lou returns and, thinking the Prince is a common hunter, tricks him and steals his horse. The Prince and Maria spend some time alone together and fall in love. As a token, the Prince gives Maria a garnet stone necklace, telling her that it will bring them together again. They part ways.

Back at their house, Mary-Lou sees Maria admiring her garnet stone necklace. Mary-Lou taunts Maria by grabbing the necklace and dropping it into a well.

In the royal castle, the King gives the Prince his approval to marry a commoner. A proclamation is issued in the kingdom that the "girl with the garnet stone" is to come to the castle, where she will wed the Prince. All girls of marrying age quickly find garnet stone necklaces and rush to the palace. Mary-Lou and her mother get a garnet stone from a local hunchback cobbler who's in love with Mary-Lou, but when they go to the palace, Mary-Lou realizes that the Prince is the hunter from the forest and that the necklace she needs to become queen is the one that was given to Maria.

Maria herself is unaware of the proclamation. After returning home, Mary-Lou offers to help Maria retrieve the necklace from the bottom of the well. When Mary-Lou reveals her intention to take the necklace for herself, the two girls struggle and fall into the well, along with Maria's little dog, Bello. At the bottom of the well, they meet a Frog King, who tells them that the necklace has been taken by the magical Mrs. Holle.

The two girls end up in the magical realm of Mrs. Holle. They ask for directions to Mrs. Holle's house, and along the way meet various magical creatures and things that need help. At each point, Maria happily helps the creatures, while Mary-Lou refuses. When they arrive at Mrs. Holle's house, Mrs. Holle explains that they have to stay awhile, because the door leading to their world is closed. Maria agrees to stay and help Mrs. Holle with her chores, but Mary-Lou leaves to find her way back. In the end, Mary-Lou reluctantly returns to the house, and Mrs. Holle sends both girls back home.

The entire village watches as the two girls are magically returned from the well. Mrs. Holle appears in the sky and says, "For what you have done of your own accord, you both shall receive your just reward." Maria's clothes transform into a beautiful white gown, and the garnet stone necklace appears around her neck. As for Mary-Lou, pitch and water falls on her, and she ends up marrying the hunchback cobbler. The Prince arrives and is reunited with Maria, taking her to the castle to be married.

== Voices ==
Character	Original	English
Herold/Herald	Gerd Dunwer	Unknown
Mary-Lou/Mary Lou	Ursula Heyer	Unknown
Der König/King	Martin Hirthe	Unknown
Stiefmutter Pulle/Stepmother	Tilly Lauenstein	Unknown
Herr Pulle/Mr. Bottle	Arnold Marquis	Unknown
Der Prinz/Prince	Uwe Paulsen	Unknown
Erzähler/Narrator	Jochen Schröder	Unknown
Mutter Holle/Mother Holle	Tina Eilers	Unknown
Schüttel Dich Baum/Apple Tree	Hans Schwarz Jr.	Unknown
Meister Pfriem/Cobbler	Wolfgang Spier	Unknown
Froschkönig/Frog King	Eduard Wandrey	Unknown
Maria	Eva-Maria Werth	Unknown
Notar/Notary	Harry Wüstenhagen	Unknown

== Release ==
In West Germany, Gamma Films released Once Upon a Time in black and white in 1973; a colour version released in West Germany in 1975. In Italy, the film received the censorship approval for public screening on January 9, 1974, but ultimately did not receive a theatrical release. The film opened in the United States on April 2, 1976 through G.G. Communications; this English-dubbed version was released on Region 1 DVD on 7 November 2006. A comic book adaptation, drawn by Gino Gavioli (the director's brother), was published in Kauka's magazine Fix und Foxi shortly before the film's release. The Fix und Foxi short "Symphonie in Müll" ("Symphony in Garbage") initially accompanied the feature in theaters. Once Upon a Time is also known as Der Zauberstein ("The Garnet Stone") in German, and Cinderella's Wonderland in the UK.

== See also ==
- List of animated feature-length films
