= Rolf Kauka =

German-American comic artist (1917–2000)

Rolf Kauka (9 April 1917 in Markranstädt, Saxony – 13 September 2000 in Thomasville, Georgia) was a German comic artist, most famous for the series Fix and Foxi.

== Career ==
In 1951, Rolf Kauka founded Kauka Publishing. Aside from Rolf Kauka's original comic characters, Kauka Publishing introduced to German audiences such international series as Asterix and The Smurfs from France and Belgium. Some characters received Germanized names, for instance, Spirou & Fantasio / Pit & Pikkolo, Gaston Lagaffe / Jojo, etc. Kauka's translation of Asterix, called Siggi und Barbarras, controversially included far-right and Nazi revisionist subtexts, such as Anti-Americanism, Anti-Communism and Holocaust denial.

In 1973, Kauka sold his publishing house to the English publisher IPC and the Dutch publishing group VNU. He maintained his right of authority, but removed himself from the active publishing world. In 1975, he founded the Kauka Comic Academy in Munich, where he concentrated on the training and continuing education of young writers and illustrators. At the end of the 1970s the publishing consortium was dissolved and Bauer/VPM began publishing Fix & Foxi.

Kauka characters/series outside the Fuxholzen (Fix und Foxi) universe:

- The Pichelsteiner - prehistoric adventure series
- Dagobert - an early character by Rolf Kauka
- Diabolino - an imp character
- Mischa - adventure series based in the future and in outer space.
- Tom and Biberherz - Old West adventure series.
- Peppercorn Family - the last series created by Rolf Kauka.

Rolf Kauka also directed the animated film Maria d'Oro und Bello Blue, which contains characters created by him.
