= Giuliano Cenci =

Italian animated film director (1931–2018)

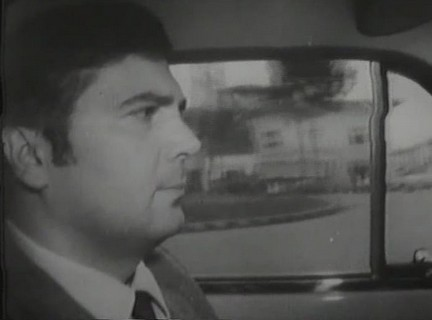
- Giuliano Cenci
- Born: 10 August 1931; Florence, Italy
- Died: 12 April 2018 (aged 86); Florence, Italy
- Occupation: animated film director

Giuliano Cenci (Florence, 10 August 1931 – Florence, 12 April 2018) was an Italian animated film director.

== Biography ==
In 1949, he obtained the Diploma of Artistic Maturity at the Art School of Florence. Still a student, he began working in the graphic arts and, as a self-taught artist, cultivated a passion for cartoons. His most famous work is the animated feature film The Adventures of Pinocchio (1972), in which he sought to adapt Carlo Collodi's novel as closely as possible to the original. Cenci was the director, screenwriter and co-producer of the film, as well as having personally done a good part of the animation along with Italo Marazzi).

Giuliano Cenci is the artist who:

- the first who realize in Italy, in 1957, the coupling between animated cartoon and live footage, i.e. the technique of live action / animated film, creating a short film mixed technique on prehistory, filmed from the truth in 16mm with their relatives interacting with animated characters (in particular the daughter Patrizia who, smiling, cradles a dwarf in her arms) and subsequently realizing many cartoons combined with the advertising for Carosello;
- first invented Stop Animation, Model Animation, and Clay Animation in Italy, with a particular system of colored plasticine that was born in Cenci, a forerunner of [Pongo, realizing numerous experiments of Puppet animation that interact with the movie from life;
- in the 2D animation has made significant technical improvements to Special effects, never made before in Italy, as the water technique clearly visible in the feature film of 1971 The Adventures of Pinocchio (still an extraordinary invention) or as the Disney system of Rotoscoping used by Cenci always in his film, the same used at the end of the following decade by Ralph Bakshi for Lord of the Rings;
- in the 1960s he created, with the precious contribution of his father Guido and his brother Renzo, two Verticali Cinematografiche, equipped with electronic control units, able to obtain complex special effects never before realized in Italy.

== Carosello ==
In 1957, still twenty-five, Cenci designed the first animated advertisements for Philco, creating a cartoon show alongside the product being advertised: this is why Cenci could be defined as the "father" of Carosello. Owing to the novelty created by Cenci, it became one of the most successful programs on Italian TV, allowing animators to express their creative flair from 1957 to 1977.

In the 1960s, together with other prominent Italian cartoonists, animators, and producers, Cenci co-founded the ISCA (Istituto di Studi e Diffusione del Cinema d'Animazione, trans. Institute for the Study and Dissemination of Animation Cinema) in Milan. The institute later became the Italian chapter of the International Animated Film Association (ASIFA Italia). At the time, as a young cartoonist but already with an important professional background, he decided to realize the personal dream of a "first work": to sign the direction of a cartoon film! Meanwhile, he also worked at the City of Florence's technical office as a project assistant, dividing his time between his office and his home, where his feature film would be born. Through a popular shareholder and after 5 years of work, with a team of 50 technicians and designers with the same passion for cartoons, the film A Puppet by the name of Pinocchio was filmed in 1971, shot in 35mm eastmancolor and produced for the film circuit.
