= Carlo Collodi =

Italian writer (1826–1890)

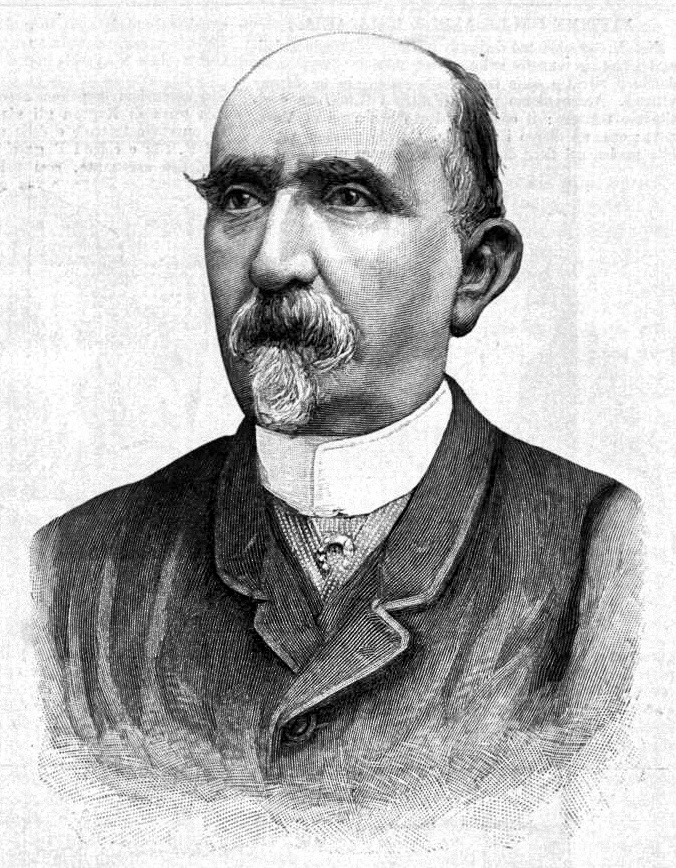
- 1890 sketch of Collodi
- Born: Carlo Lorenzini; 24 November 1826; Florence, Grand Duchy of Tuscany
- Died: 26 October 1890 (aged 63); Florence, Tuscany, Kingdom of Italy
- Resting place: Cimitero delle Porte Sante, Florence
- Occupations: Writer; novelist
- Writing career
- Genres: Children's literature; political satire; journalism

Carlo Lorenzini (Italian: [ˈkarlo lorenˈtsiːni]; 24 November 1826 – 26 October 1890), better known by the pen name Carlo Collodi (/kəˈloʊdi/ kə-LOH-dee, Italian: [kolˈlɔːdi]), was an Italian author, humourist, and journalist, widely known for his fairy tale novel The Adventures of Pinocchio.

== Early life ==
Lorenzini was born in Florence on 24 November 1826. His mother Angiolina Orzali Lorenzini was a seamstress from Collodi, the town from which he later took the pen name, and his father Domenico Lorenzini was a cook. Both parents worked for the marchese Ginori Lisci. Carlo was the eldest child in the family and he had ten siblings; seven died at a young age. He spent most of his childhood in the town of Collodi where his mother was born. He lived there with his maternal grandmother. After attending primary school, he was sent to study at a theological seminary in Colle Val d'Elsa. An account at the seminary shows that the marchese had offered financial aid, but the boy found that he did not want to be a priest so he continued his education at the College of the Scolopi Fathers in Florence. In 1844, he started working at the Florentine bookstore Libreria Piatti, where he assisted Giuseppe Aiazzi, a prominent Italian manuscript specialist.

== Career ==
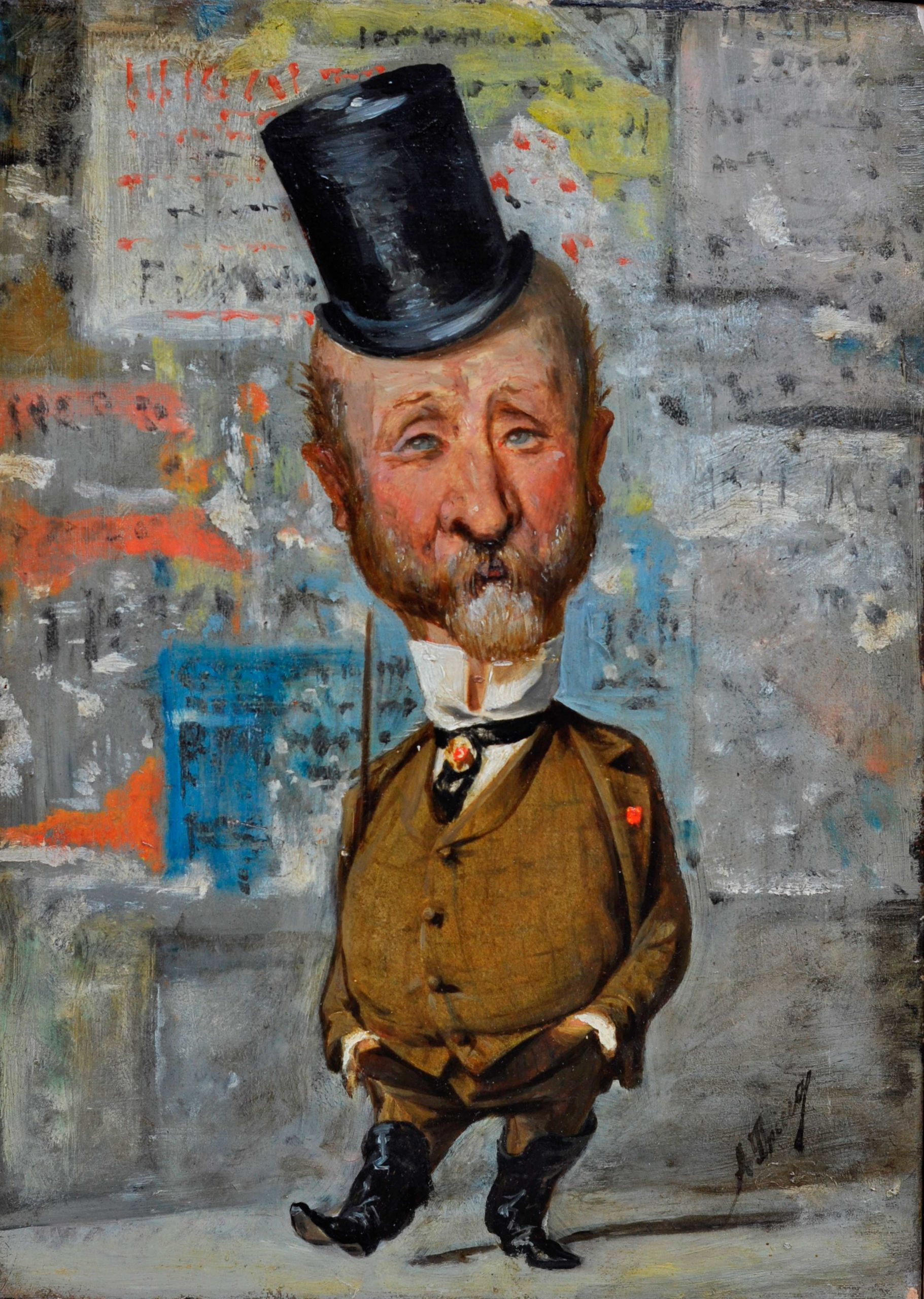
Caricature of Collodi, c. 1875

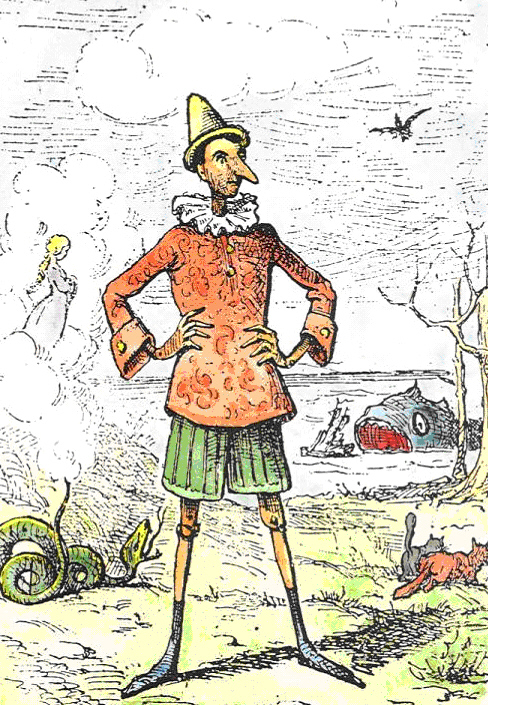
Pinocchio, by Enrico Mazzanti, the first illustrator (1883) of The Adventures of Pinocchio

During the Italian Wars of Independence in 1848 and 1860, Lorenzini served as a volunteer with the Tuscan Army. His active interest in political matters can be seen in his earliest literary works, as well as in the founding of the satirical newspaper Il Lampione in 1853. This newspaper was censored by order of the Grand Duke of Tuscany. In 1854, he published his second newspaper, Lo scaramuccia ("The Controversy"). Lorenzini's first publications were in his periodicals. A debut came in 1856 with the play Gli amici di casa and parodic guidebook Un romanzo in vapore, both in 1856. By 1860, he published his first notable work called Il signor Alberi ha ragione! (Mr. Alberi Is Right!), which outlined his political and cultural vision of Italy. This is the text where Lorenzini started using the Collodi pseudonym, which was taken from his mother's hometown.

Lorenzini had also begun intense activity on other political newspapers such as Il Fanfulla; at the same time he was employed by the Censorship Commission for the Theatre. During this period he composed various satirical sketches and stories (sometimes simply by collating earlier articles), including Macchiette (1880), Occhi e nasi (1881), and Storie allegre (1887).

Lorenzini became disenchanted with Italian politics afterwards, so he turned to children's literature and his first works involved translating French fairy tales into Italian. In 1875, for instance, he completed Racconti delle fate, a translation of French fairy tales by Charles Perrault. In 1876, Lorenzini wrote Giannettino (inspired by Alessandro Luigi Parravicini's Giannetto), the Minuzzolo, and Il viaggio per l'Italia di Giannettino, a pedagogic series which explored the unification of Italy through the ironic thoughts and actions of the character Giannettino.

Lorenzini became fascinated by the idea of using an amiable, rascally character as a means of expressing his own convictions through allegory. In 1880, he began writing Storia di un burattino (Story of a Marionette), also called Le avventure di Pinocchio, which was published weekly in Giornale per i bambini. Pinocchio was adapted into a 1940 film by Disney that is considered to be one of Disney's greatest films.

== Death and legacy ==
Lorenzini died suddenly in Florence on 26 October 1890, at the age of 63, and is interred at Cimitero delle Porte Sante in Florence. The National Carlo Collodi Foundation was established in 1962 to promote education and the works of Collodi, and Pinocchio Park, which was opened in 1956 in the town of Collodi and remains a popular attraction today.

== Bibliography ==
- Proietti, Domenico (2006). "LORENZINI, Carlo". Dizionario Biografico degli Italiani (in Italian). Vol. 66: Lorenzetto–Macchetti. Rome: Istituto dell'Enciclopedia Italiana. ISBN 978-88-12-00032-6.
