= Pinocchio (2012 film) =

- Promotional poster
- Directed by: Enzo D'Alò
- Screenplay by: Enzo D'Alò
- Based on: The Adventures of Pinocchio by Carlo Collodi
- Produced by: Goesens Eric; Nicolas Steil
- Starring: Johnny Orlando; Ambyr Childers; Jon Heder
- Edited by: Gianluca Cristofari
- Music by: Lucio Dalla
- Production companies: 2d3D Animations; Cometa Film; Iris Productions; Walking the dog
- Distributed by: Lucky Red (Italy); Gébéka Films (France); Cinéart (Belgium)
- Release dates: 20 August 2012 (Venice); 21 February 2013 (Italy)
- Running time: 84 minutes
- Countries: Italy; France; Belgium; Luxembourg
- Language: Italian
- Budget: €8 million

Pinocchio is a 2012 Italian animated musical fantasy film directed by Enzo D'Alò. It is based on the 1883 novel The Adventures of Pinocchio by Carlo Collodi. The film had a budget of about €8 million. It was screened out of competition at the 70th Venice International Film Festival.

The original score was composed by Lucio Dalla, and includes songs performed by Leda Battisti and Nada. The vocal cast of the film includes Rocco Papaleo, Maurizio Micheli, Paolo Ruffini, Andy Luotto, and Lucio Dalla.

An English dub was made in Canada the same year, and it was released in the United Kingdom by Koch Media on 4 November 2013 (as Pinocchio - The Adventures of Pinocchio) and in Australia and New Zealand by Rialto Distribution. It was released in the United States by Lionsgate Home Entertainment on 10 April 2018 with help from Bang Zoom! Entertainment, with some characters re-dubbed by Johnny Orlando, Ambyr Childers, and Jon Heder.

== Plot ==
In a small village in Tuscany, the poor carpenter Geppetto decides to forge a wooden puppet naming it Pinocchio. Pinocchio, however, starts running all over the city, sowing weeds between one street and another, until he is stopped by two carabinieri. When Pinocchio refuses to go home, the carabinieri, hearing people think that Geppetto is probably violent with the puppet, arrest him and let go of Pinocchio. Ignoring warnings from a talking cricket who Pinocchio silences with a log, Pinocchio goes home and dreams of his life as a vagabond who he intends to do. When Geppetto returns the next morning, he finds that Pinocchio had burned off his feet. After Geppetto carves new feet for him, Pinocchio agrees to behave well and to start going to school.

To allow him to study, Geppetto sells his tunic for the abbey. Instead of going to school, Pinocchio sells the book to attend a puppet show. Also living, the puppets invite Pinocchio to the stage, angering Fire-Eater who first intends to burn him but then changes his mind and gives him gold coins, after learning about Geppetto and sends him home escorted by his employees Trixie the Fox and Leo the Cat. They trick him into taking the money, telling him about the Fields of Miracles, where coins sprout in trees of money.

After a night at an inn, Pinocchio strolls out, again ignoring the Cricket (in the form of a spirit), only to be pursued by Leo and Trixie posing as bandits who hang him for his money as the Cat's paw is injured in the process. A girl with blue hair shows compassion on him and gets her servants to set him free. After some firm but fair words from the Cricket and encouragement from the girl, Pinocchio goes on his way to his father.

He runs into Trixie and Leo, and the two con artists mislead him into going with them to the Field of Miracles, which is outside of the town of Catchfools. After he plants his coins, he learns from a parrot the Fox and the Cat conned him and stole his money. He tells a baboon judge only to be locked up in a prison cell as innocence is not favored in Catchfools. Eventually, he is released by the dog guard during a celebration by stating that he committed a crime.

After that, Pinocchio decides to be a good boy and go to school the next day, but he is stopped by some bullies who take him to the seaside. As Pinocchio gets caught by the police, he runs away from them until a police dog named Alidoro falls into the sea. Showing compassion for him, Pinocchio decides to save the dog's life and he helps him swim to shore, but is unfortunately caught by The Green Fisherman, who has a desire to eat him. However, Alidoro, showing gratefulness, saves the puppet's life. After a talk with a dove a while later, she decides to help him return home, so Pinocchio climbs onto the dove's back and bids Alidoro farewell, and soon they fly off.

After stopping at the docks, Pinocchio thanks the dove, but soon, it starts to rain. He runs off into a warehouse where he meets Wickley, a lazy boy who's going to Amusement World. Having the urge to go, the puppet joins him and some other kids on a boat that's going to said park. When they arrive, the kids have lots of fun. On the next day, Pinocchio and Wickley accidentally lose the group and decide to follow them. Soon, they go to a floor where they discover that all of the kids have turned to donkeys to make Amusement World work. As the two boys find themselves turning into donkeys, Wickley is dragged off by one of the park’s clown henchmen, while Pinocchio is forced to work at the circus above. However, when the performance goes horribly wrong, the Ringmaster finds him no use, so he orders the clown henchmen to throw him into the sea.

In the ocean, the Blue-Haired Girl uses her magic to turn Pinocchio back into a puppet while also releasing him from the sack. He is then swallowed by a giant fish swimming by. In the belly of the fish, he reunites with Geppetto, who tells him that he went out looking for him, but because there was a bad storm, the boat capsized, and the same fish swallowed him. And so, the two make amends, and they escape from the fish while it is sleeping with its mouth open. As the two see the sunrise, Pinocchio realizes that his father can't swim, so he urges Geppetto to climb on his back. The puppet, now losing consciousness, tells his father to persevere. Upon seeing both father and son swimming to shore, the two policemen and Alidoro are on the beach as the policeman’s dog comes to Pinocchio and Geppetto's aid. As soon as they reach the shore, the Blue-Haired Girl appears, kisses him on the head, and disappears just as the policemen and the father arrive to save him.

The next day, Pinocchio wakes up in bed to realize that he is now a real boy instead of a puppet. As he and his father laugh and sing together, they go for a walk in the village while his shirt turns back into the kite that Geppetto had when he was young. The father and son go to the village while the kite soars into the sky, ending the film.

== Voice cast ==
- Gabriele Caprio – Pinocchio
- Mino Caprio – Geppetto
- Carlo Valli – Grillo Parlante
- Maricla Affatato – La Volpe
- Maurizio Micheli – Il Gatto
- Rocco Papaleo – Mangiafuoco
- Lucrezia Marricchi – La Fata dai Capelli Turchini
- Paolo Ruffini – Lucignolo
- Paolo Lombardi - The Owl
- Massimo Corvo - The Crow
- Lucio Dalla - Green Fisherman
- Luca Dal Fabbro - First Fisherman

=== English dub cast ===
- Robert Naylor – Pinocchio
- Michael Rudder – Geppetto
- Arthur Grosser – Talking Cricket
- Sonja Ball – The Fox, Soprano, Teacher
- Thor Bishopric – The Cat, Curious Man
- Vlasta Vrána – Fire-Eater, Dog Jailer
- Jennifer Suliteneau – The Fairy with Turquoise Hair
- Noah Bernett – Wickley
- Maria Bircher – Curious Woman, The Dove
- Raphael Cohen – Gervaso, Young Geppetto
- Julian D'Addario – Arturo
- Richard Dumont – Punch
- A.J. Henderson – Alidoro, Seller
- Arthur Holden – Policeman #1, The Owl, Town Crier
- Rick Jones – Harlequin, Parrot, The Judge, The Ringmaster
- Richard Jutras – The Butter Man
- Ranee Lee – Singer at Inn
- Michel Perron – Clown #1, The Innkeeper
- Donovan Reiter – Clown #2, Fisherman
- Terrence Scammell – Busker, Citizen, Policeman #2, Principal
- Harry Standjofski – The Crow, The Green Fisherman

2018 Bang Zoom! Entertainment dub:

- Johnny Orlando – Pinocchio
- Ambyr Childers – Trixie the Fox
- Jon Heder – Leo the Cat
- Brad Venable – Innkeeper, Clown #1
- Doug Erholtz – Clown #2
- Julie Ann Taylor – Gervaso

Additional voices by Rebecca Davis, Tom Fahn, Kyle McCarley, and Paul St. Peter

== Reception ==
Common Sense Media gave the show 3 out of 5 stars, praising the animation, characters and familiar messages.
