= Pinocchio (2022 live-action film) =

American film by Robert Zemeckis

- Promotional release poster
- Directed by: Robert Zemeckis
- Screenplay by: Robert Zemeckis; Chris Weitz
- Based on: Disney's Pinocchio; The Adventures of Pinocchio by Carlo Collodi
- Produced by: Andrew Milano; Chris Weitz; Robert Zemeckis; Derek Hogue
- Starring: Tom Hanks; Benjamin Evan Ainsworth; Joseph Gordon-Levitt; Keegan-Michael Key; Lorraine Bracco; Giuseppe Battiston; Cynthia Erivo; Luke Evans
- Cinematography: Don Burgess
- Edited by: Jesse Goldsmith; Mick Audsley
- Music by: Alan Silvestri
- Production companies: Walt Disney Pictures; Depth of Field; ImageMovers
- Distributed by: Disney+
- Release date: September 8, 2022
- Running time: 105 minutes
- Country: United States
- Language: English
- Budget: $150 million

Pinocchio is a 2022 American musical fantasy film that is a live-action remake of Walt Disney's 1940 animated film, which itself is based on the 1883 book The Adventures of Pinocchio. The film was directed by Robert Zemeckis, written by Zemeckis and Chris Weitz, and stars Tom Hanks, Cynthia Erivo, Giuseppe Battiston and Luke Evans, with the voices of Benjamin Evan Ainsworth, Joseph Gordon-Levitt, Keegan-Michael Key, and Lorraine Bracco.

The reimagined story follows a wooden puppet named Pinocchio, who is brought to life by a blue fairy after being crafted by an old Italian woodcarver named Geppetto. While the role of Pinocchio's conscience Jiminy Cricket attempts to guide Pinocchio in matters of right and wrong, Pinocchio encounters a host of unsavory characters in his efforts to become a real boy.

Development of the live-action Pinocchio began in 1985, with Jim Henson and Steve Barron approached with the idea, but Disney turned down the project. Disney eventually announced the film in April 2015, with Peter Hedges reported to be writing the film's script, before being replaced with Weitz in May 2017. Sam Mendes and Paul King were originally considered for directing, but Zemeckis was confirmed as director in January 2020. By November 2018, it was reported that Hanks was in early talks to play Geppetto; he passed on the project after King's departure but rejoined in August 2020. The main cast was announced in January and March 2021. Principal photography began in March 2021 before finishing the following month. Alan Silvestri, who has collaborated in all of Zemeckis's films, composed the score and also wrote new songs with Glen Ballard. It was produced by Walt Disney Pictures, Depth of Field and ImageMovers.

Pinocchio was released on September 8, 2022, by Disney+, as part of Disney+ Day. It received generally negative reviews from critics and received six Golden Raspberry Award nominations, winning Worst Remake, Rip-off or Sequel.

== Plot ==
In a small Italian village in 19th century, a vagrant cricket named Jiminy Cricket enters the home of a widowed elderly woodcarver named Geppetto, who lives with his pet kitten Figaro and goldfish Cleo. Geppetto has completed work on a puppet based on his young deceased son, which he names Pinocchio. Before falling asleep, Geppetto makes a wish on a star. Later that night, the star magically brings Pinocchio to life and he is soon visited by the Blue Fairy who tells him that if he acts brave, truthful and selfless, he can be a real boy. The Blue Fairy appoints Jiminy the responsibility of being Pinocchio's conscience to teach him right from wrong. When Geppetto awakens and finds Pinocchio alive, he is at first shocked, but becomes overjoyed.

After a few days, Geppetto sends Pinocchio to school. The fox con-artist, "Honest" John, and his cat partner, Gideon, soon approach Pinocchio. He convinces Pinocchio that he should live a life of fame to truly be a real boy when he really plans to sell him to the puppet master Stromboli. With the help of a seagull named Sofia, Jiminy convinces Pinocchio to go to school, but the headmaster throws Pinocchio out of the school because he is a puppet. Pinocchio decides to go to Stromboli's after all while Honest John places a glass jar over Jiminy. Geppetto, Figaro, and Cleo go out to look for Pinocchio when he fails to come home for dinner. At Stromboli's theater, Pinocchio befriends one of Stromboli's employees, Fabiana and her puppet Sabina. Pinocchio puts on a good show for the crowd, but Stromboli locks him in a bird cage to prevent him from ever leaving. Stromboli's coach ends up freeing Jiminy from the jar and Pinocchio has him reach the keys for the cage's lock by telling lies to make his nose grow longer.

Soon, Pinocchio is swiped up by a coach full of children driven by a charismatic Coachman, who is taking them to Pleasure Island, where misbehavior is encouraged. Once there, Pinocchio is disturbed by some of the brutality the kids display, but befriends an irresponsible boy named Lampwick and manages to enjoy some of the attractions. Later on, Jiminy finds that all of the children have turned into donkeys and that the Coachman sells them to the salt mines with help from his Vapor Monsters. Pinocchio witnesses Lampwick's transformation at a billiard hall as Pinocchio gains a donkey's ears and tail. Pinocchio and Jiminy escape the island before the Coachman and his goons can get them.

Pinocchio and Jiminy make it back to Geppetto's, but find that Sofia gave him a flyer of Pleasure Island to let him know where Pinocchio was and that he sold all of his clocks to buy a boat to go there. Pinocchio reunites with Fabiana and Sabina who tell him that Stromboli has been arrested by the Carabinieri last night for cruelty against his employees, and they have taken over his puppet show. They offer Pinocchio to join them, but Pinocchio declines, wanting to save his father, which makes his donkey parts disappear. Sofia pulls a rope for Pinocchio to hold out to the Mediterranean Sea, where they soon find Geppetto in his boat. Just as they reunite, they are swallowed by a giant sea monster named Monstro. They take refuge in a giant boat in Monstro's stomach and Pinocchio gets the idea to make him sneeze by starting a fire within him. The plan works, and Monstro sneezes them out, but he gives chase that ends with the group crashing on dry land and apparently killing Geppetto.

Believing his father has died, Pinocchio mourns over him and a magical tear falls from his eye onto Geppetto, reviving him. Geppetto tells Pinocchio that despite being a puppet, he has proven himself to be a true boy at heart. As Pinocchio and Geppetto depart for home, Jiminy narrates that stories have been told of Pinocchio becoming a real boy, but does not confirm them, stressing that, in his heart, Pinocchio is already a real boy.

== Cast ==
- Tom Hanks as Geppetto, an Italian woodcarver and toymaker who creates Pinocchio out of grief for the death of his young son.
- Benjamin Evan Ainsworth as the voice of Pinocchio, a living wooden puppet carved by Geppetto, and brought to life by the Blue Fairy. He seeks to learn about right and wrong so that he can become a real boy.
- Joseph Gordon-Levitt as the voice of Jiminy Cricket, an anthropomorphic cricket who acts as Pinocchio's "conscience" and the partial narrator of the story.
- Keegan-Michael Key as the voice of Honest John, an anthropomorphic red fox con artist who convinces Pinocchio to go to Stromboli's puppet show. He is often accompanied by Gideon, his mute, bumbling, anthropomorphic cat sidekick who serves as the film's comic relief.
- Lorraine Bracco as the voice of Sofia, a seagull that Geppetto knows who befriends Jiminy.
- Cynthia Erivo as The Blue Fairy, a magical fairy who brings Pinocchio to life and promises to turn him into a real boy if he proves himself brave, truthful and selfless.
- Luke Evans as The Coachman, the charismatic but imposing owner and operator of Pleasure Island where unruly children are turned into donkeys and sold. He speaks with a harsh Cockney accent and is served by the Vapor Monsters.
- Giuseppe Battiston as Stromboli, a puppet master who intends to force Pinocchio to perform onstage to make money. He speaks with an Italian accent and curses gibberish when he gets angry.
- Kyanne Lamaya as Fabiana, a puppeteer who works for Stromboli. She used to be a ballerina until a leg injury ended her dancing career, causing her to wear a leg brace as she works to regain her ballet skills.
- Jaquita Ta'le as Sabina, Fabiana's marionette.
- Angus Wright as Signore Rizzi, an Italian gentleman who wants to purchase one of Geppetto's clocks.
- Sheila Atim as Signora Vitelli, an Italian woman whose job is to escort children to school.
- Lewin Lloyd as Lampwick, an irresponsible boy whom Pinocchio befriends on his way to Pleasure Island.
- Jamie Demetriou as the headmaster who kicks Pinocchio out of his school for being a puppet.

Pleasure Island troupe portrayed by Adelaide Barham, Poppy Blackwood, Katie Boothroyd, Lucy Boothroyd, Louisa Boyd Leslie, Tyne Burgess, Verity Constantinou, Sylvie Cotterell, Phoebe Davies, Memphis-Lee Dixon, Joseph Duffy, Talia Etherington, Aimee Enejo, Felix Fewell Russell, Darcey Foster, Ben George, Jack Grant, Barney Harper, Ayla Hooper, Dean Johnson, Leila Johnson, Isla King, Jaxon Knopf, Keir Loughran, Oscar Loughran, Anya Lucker, Harrison Mackinnon, Poppy Mardlin, Imogen Maynard, Sebastian McDonough, Ruby Middleton, Abeni Munro, Samuel Newby, Kheiri Isaac-Osmani, Amira Piddington, Max Powers-Jones, Ella Robertson, Sophie Roscoe, Ethan Sey, Sebastian Shotliff, Fred Sweetman, Sophia Symondson-Cann, Evie Templeton, Conall Turner, Stanley Voss, Louis Wakeling, Calista Walters, Edward Walton, Nathan Whale, Fred Wilcox, Sam Winser, and Theo Wyatt.

Non-speaking animal characters include Geppetto's pet kitten Figaro and goldfish Cleo, and Monstro, an enormous, chimeric sea monster who devours anything that crosses his path.

== Production ==
=== Development ===
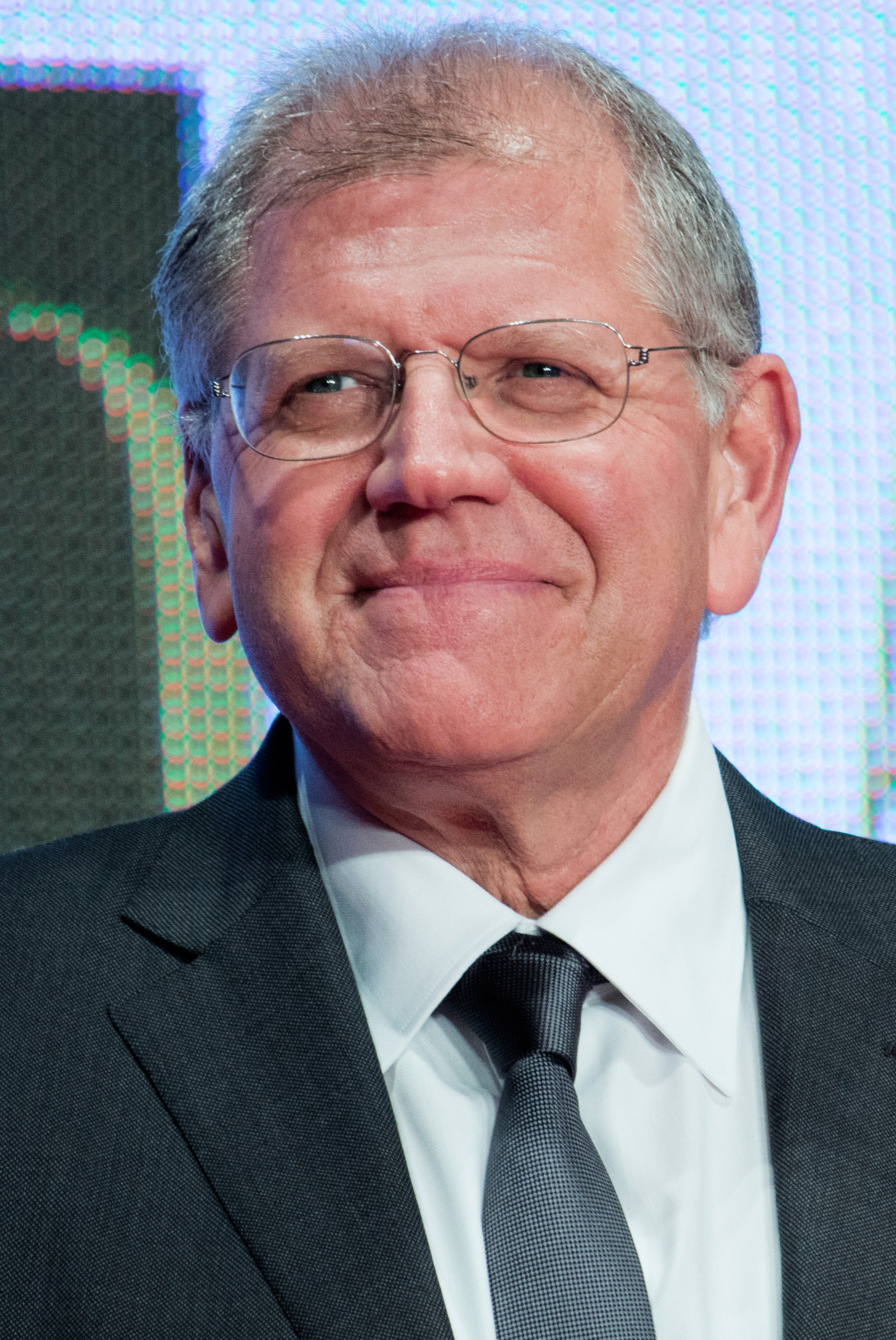
Director/co-writer/co-producer Robert Zemeckis (left) and co-writer/co-producer Chris Weitz (right).

In 1985, Jim Henson and director Steve Barron approached Walt Disney Pictures with the idea of a live-action version of Pinocchio, but Disney turned down the project. Barron still managed to make The Adventures of Pinocchio (1996), distributed by New Line Cinema. On April 8, 2015, it was announced that Walt Disney Pictures was developing a live-action adaptation of the 1940 animated film Pinocchio. Peter Hedges was reported to be writing the film's script. On May 22, 2017, it was announced that Chris Weitz would replace Hedges as a screenwriter, as well as serve as a producer, while Sam Mendes was in talks to direct the project. On November 13, 2017, Mendes stepped down as the director.

On February 20, 2018, it was announced that Paul King was set to direct the film, while Andrew Milano was announced to be co-producing the film alongside Weitz, and production was expected to begin in late 2018. Though Jack Thorne was announced to be re-writing Weitz's script, Weitz revealed on August 21, 2018, that the script was still being developed, as well as that production was set to take place in England and Italy during 2019. In November 2018, Simon Farnaby was reported to have worked on a new draft for the film. However, on January 13, 2019, it was reported that King left the film due to "family reasons", while Disney was announced to be searching for a new director for the project.

On October 18, 2019, it was reported that Robert Zemeckis was in talks to direct the film, while the film's latest version of the screenplay was reported to have been written by Weitz, King, and Farnaby, with Weitz and Milano still being attached to the project as producers. On January 24, 2020, it was reported that Jack Rapke and Jackie Levine would serve as executive producers.

=== Casting ===
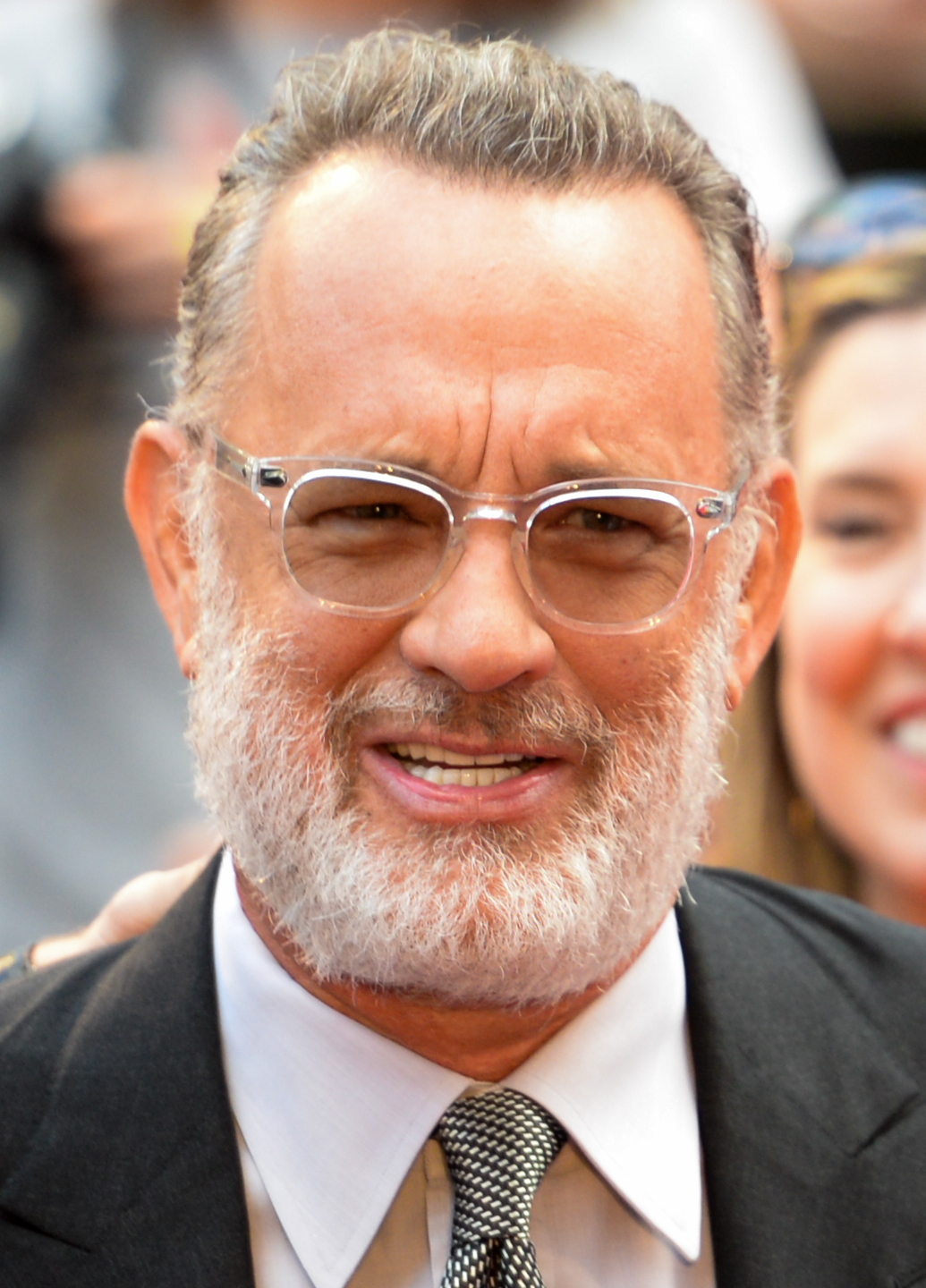
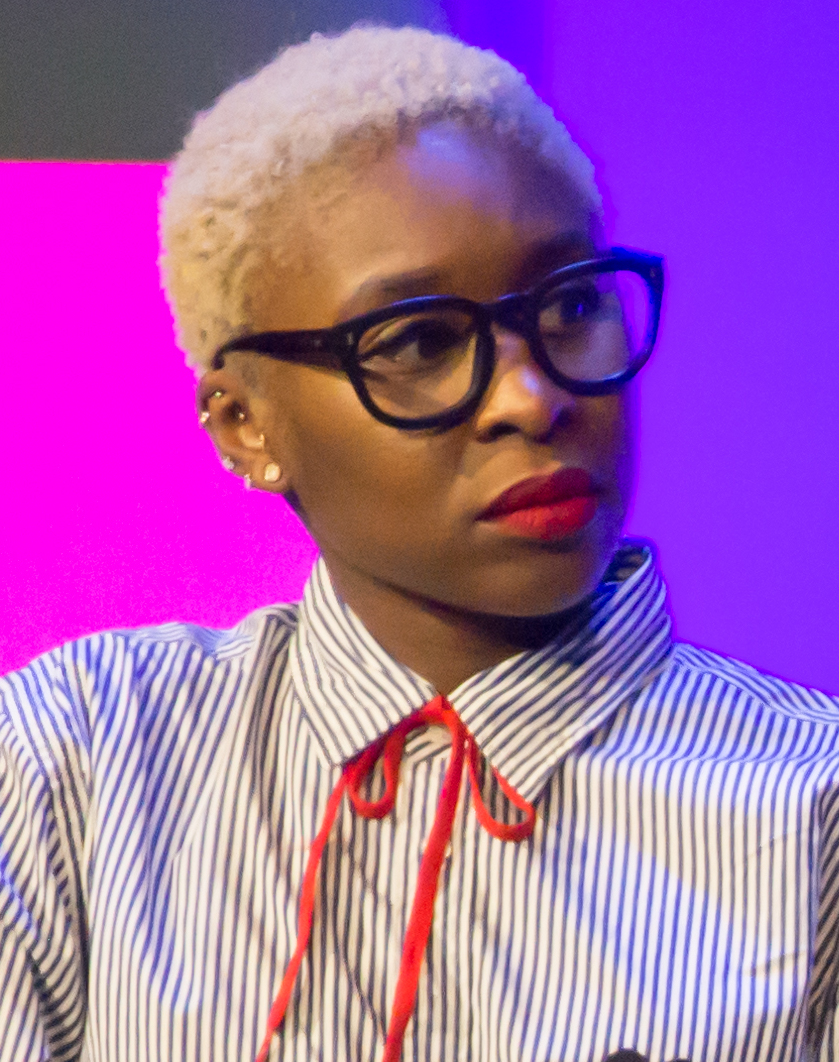
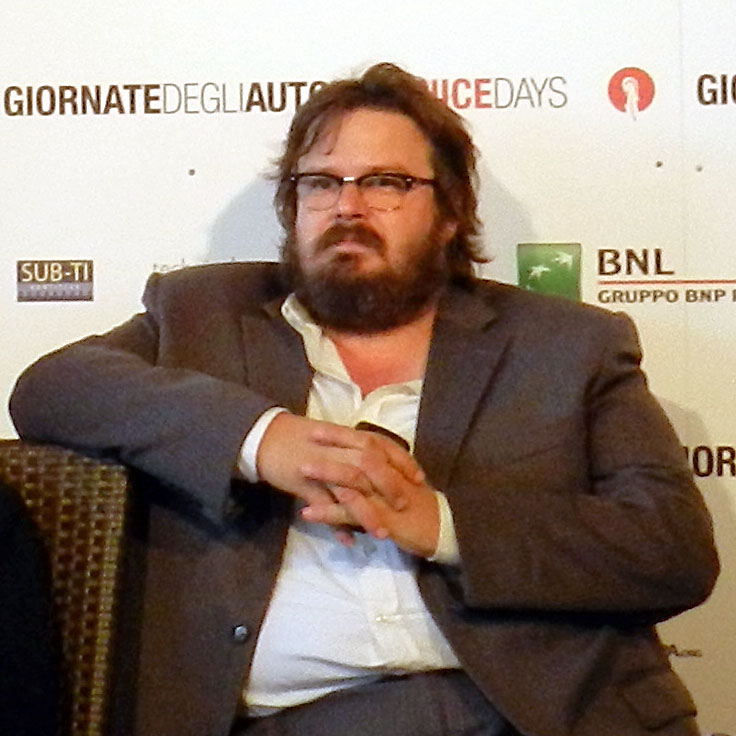
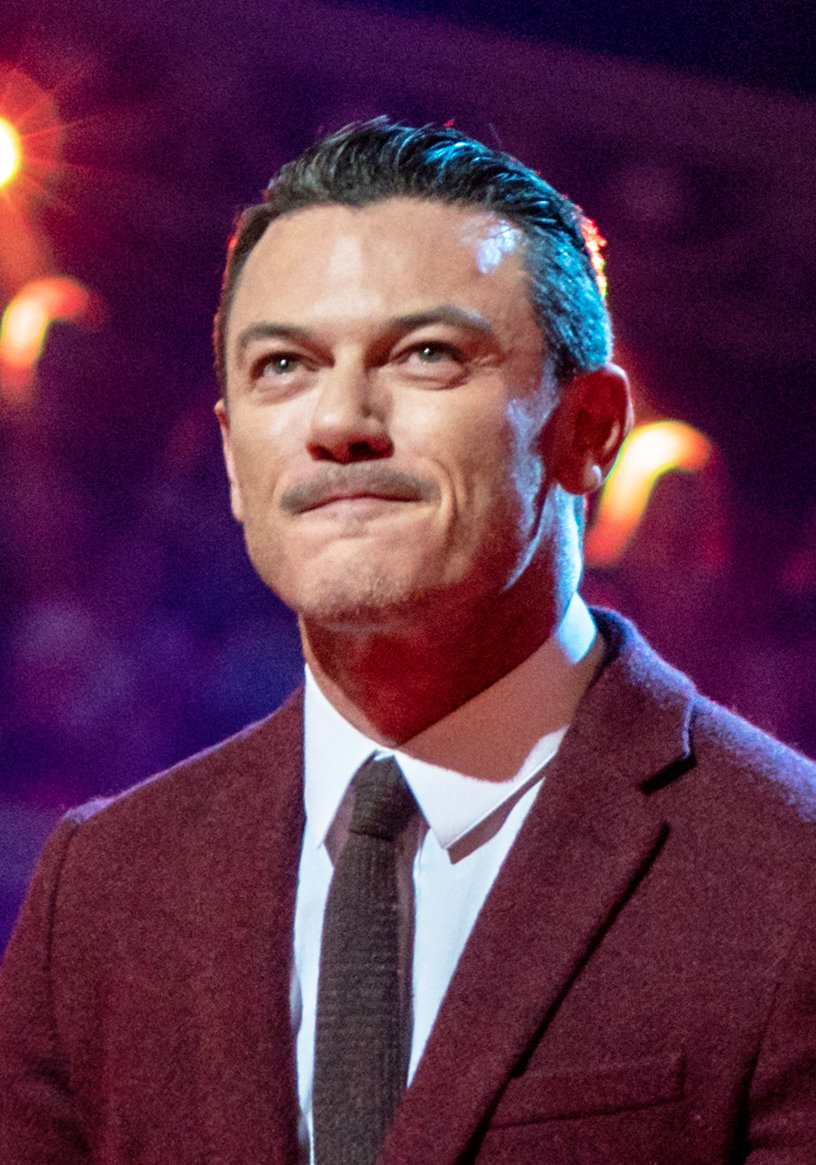
Tom Hanks (left), Cynthia Erivo, Giuseppe Battiston and Luke Evans play Geppetto, The Blue Fairy, Stromboli and The Coachman.
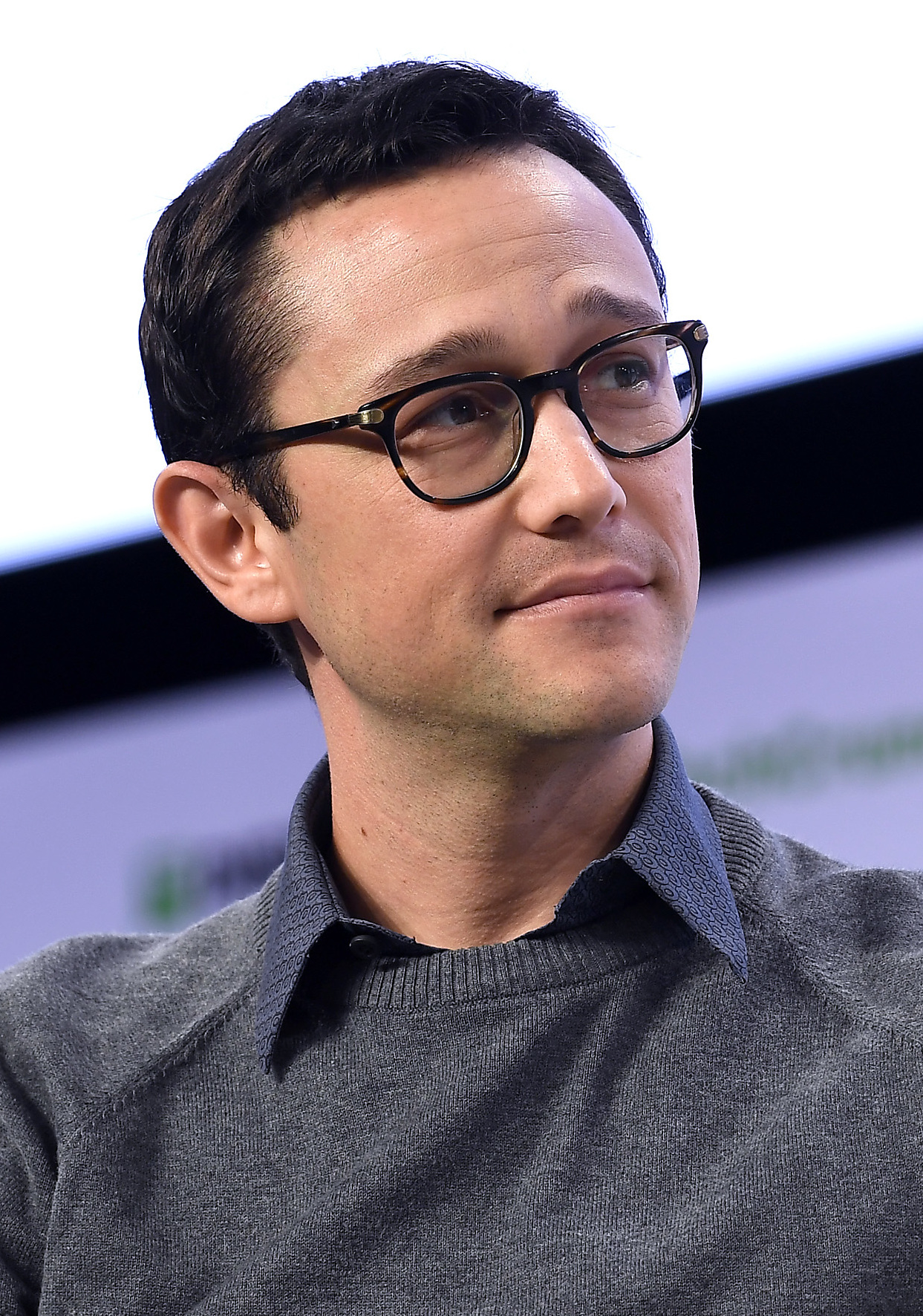
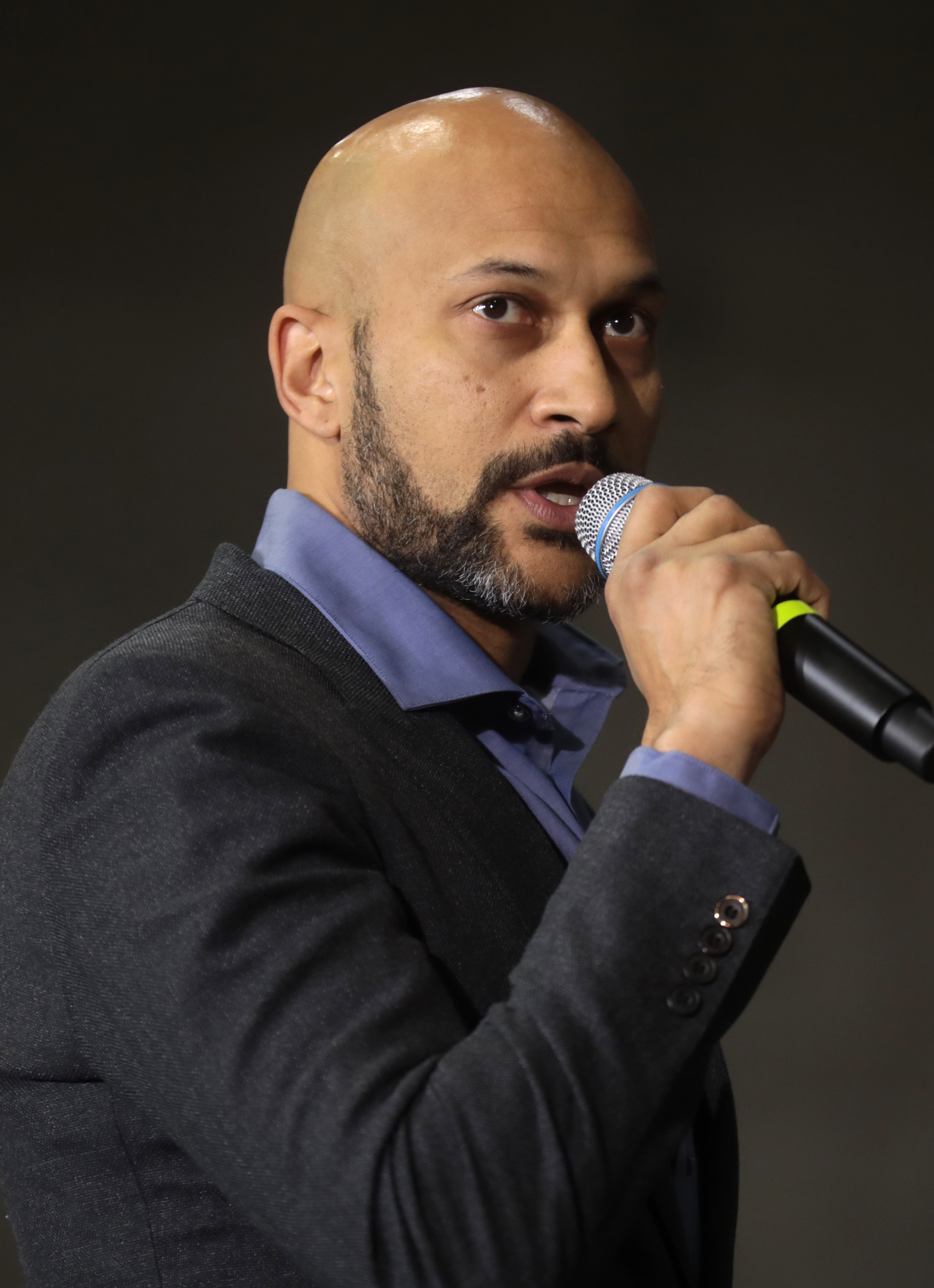
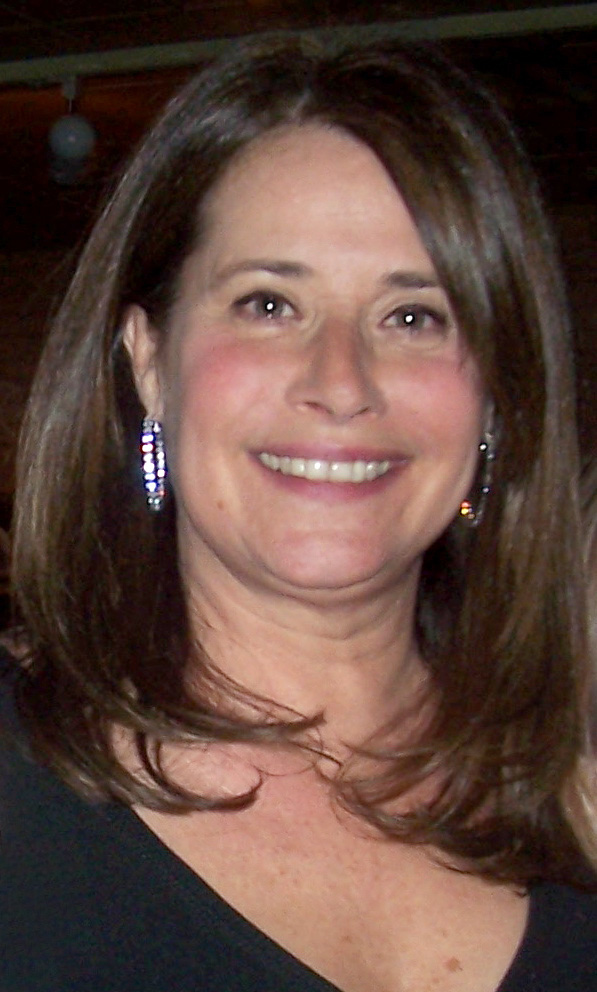
Joseph Gordon-Levitt (left), Keegan-Michael Key and Lorraine Bracco voice Jiminy Cricket, "Honest" John Worthington Foulfellow and Sofia the Seagull.

On November 29, 2018, it was reported that Tom Hanks was in early talks to play Geppetto in the film, but passed on the project after King's departure. In August 2020, Hanks rejoined the project. Hanks reportedly reached out to director Robert Zemeckis for the role after reading the script; the two have previously worked together in the films Forrest Gump (1994), Cast Away (2000), and The Polar Express (2004). In January 2021, Luke Evans joined the cast as the Coachman and Oakes Fegley entered early negotiations to play Lampwick. Lewin Lloyd was eventually cast in the role. In March, Benjamin Evan Ainsworth was cast in the titular role, with Cynthia Erivo, Joseph Gordon-Levitt, Keegan-Michael Key and Lorraine Bracco also added. Erivo portrayed The Blue Fairy, while Gordon-Levitt, Key and Bracco voiced Jiminy Cricket, Honest John and a new character, Sofia the Seagull, respectively.

=== Filming ===
Principal photography began on March 17, 2021, in Cardington Film Studios, England, under the working title Mahogany. Filming was completed in April 2021 according to Benjamin Evan Ainswoth.

=== Visual effects and animation ===
Moving Picture Company provided full animation and visual effects for the film. DNEG contributed a part of the virtual production.

== Music ==
Alan Silvestri, a recurring collaborator with Zemeckis, composed the score for the film. The song, "When You Wish Upon a Star", was performed by Cynthia Erivo as the Blue Fairy. On August 31, 2022, it was revealed that "Hi-Diddle-Dee-Dee (An Actor's Life for Me)" and "I've Got No Strings" would also be featured, along with the titles of the four new songs: "When He Was Here with Me" and "Pinocchio, Pinocchio" performed by Tom Hanks as Geppetto, "I Will Always Dance" performed by Kyanne Lamaya as Fabiana, and "The Coachman to Pleasure Island" performed by Luke Evans as the Coachman. Only four songs from the original film, "Little Wooden Head", "Give a Little Whistle", and the reprises of "Hi-Diddle-Dee-Dee" and "When You Wish Upon a Star" did not make the cut. In addition to the songs from the original film, Silvestri and Glen Ballard wrote new songs for the project. The soundtrack album was released on September 8, 2022, the same day as the film.

== Marketing ==
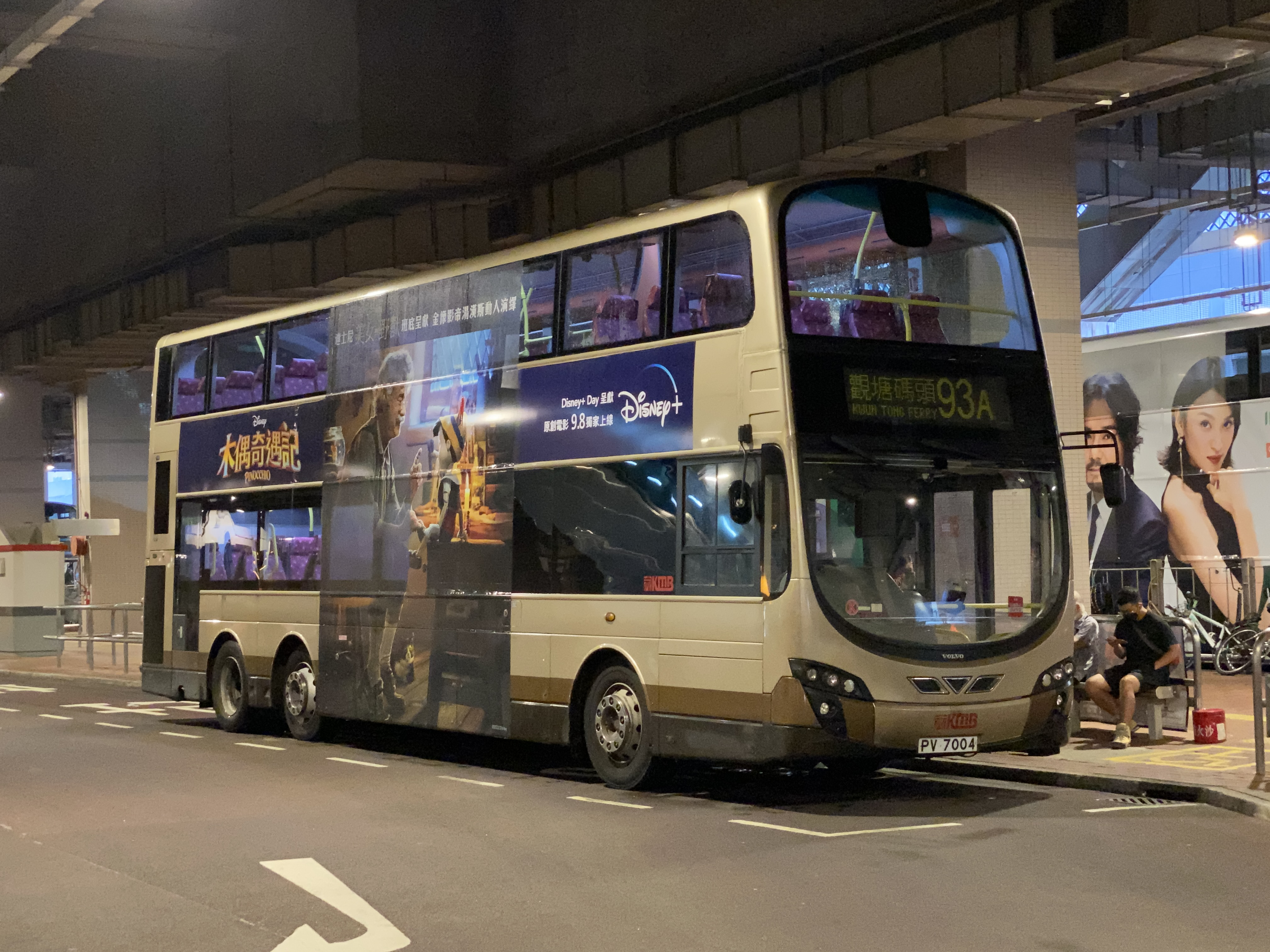
A bus advertising the film in Hong Kong

On March 9, 2022, the first look at the upcoming adaptation was released, revealing that the film would be released in September of that year. The teaser trailer and poster for Pinocchio debuted on May 31, 2022, announcing the premiere date of September 8 on Disney+, coinciding with Disney+ Day. The trailer features part of Erivo's rendition of "When You Wish Upon a Star" as well as footage of Hanks as Geppetto. On August 22, a teaser used to promote Disney+ Day showed the first look of Pinocchio's CGI appearance, near-identical to the 1940 animated version. On August 24, 2022, the official trailer and the first-look photos for the live-action adaptation were released. On August 29, Disney+ released a behind-the-scenes featurette that included interviews with some members of the film's cast. On September 8, Disney+ released a second featurette which details the impact the 1940 animated version had on the film's cast and crew as well as the satisfaction it gives them to bring the story to a new generation. On September 15, Disney+ released a third featurette which featured new interviews with composer Alan Silvestri, Benjamin Evan Ainsworth (voice of Pinocchio), Luke Evans and lyricist Glen Ballard sharing insights on their respective contributions to the film.

== Release ==
On October 29, 2019, it was reported that Disney was considering releasing the film on its streaming service Disney+ due to the box office failure of its 2019 remake of Dumbo, though "a theatrical release seems more likely" after the hiring of Robert Zemeckis as director. On December 9, 2020, the film was officially announced to be moving back to Disney+ instead of a theatrical release in response to the COVID-19 pandemic. The film was released on September 8, 2022, as part of Disney+ Day.

== Reception ==
=== Viewership ===
Nielsen Media Research, which records streaming viewership on certain American television screens, calculated that Pinocchio was streamed for 930 million minutes from September 5—11. In the following week, from September 12–18, the film recorded 510 million minutes of watch time, making it the second most-streamed film that week. The streaming aggregator Reelgood, which tracks real-time data from 20 million U.S. users for original and acquired content across SVOD and AVOD services, reported that it was the fifth most-streamed program in the U.S. during the week of September 17. Whip Media, which tracks viewership data for the more than 21 million worldwide users of its TV Time app, estimated that Pinocchio was the eighth most-streamed film in the U.S. during the week of September 23.

=== Critical response ===
Pinocchio received negative reviews from critics and is considered to be among the worst Disney live-action remakes produced to date. On the review aggregator website Rotten Tomatoes, 27% of 179 critics' reviews are positive, with an average rating of 4.7/10. The website's consensus reads: "Visually dazzling but soulless, the largely inert Pinocchio reaffirms that you should always let your conscience be your guide… away from unnecessary remakes." It is the lowest rated Disney live-action remake on the site. Metacritic assigned the film a weighted average score of 38 out of 100, based on 37 critics, indicating "generally unfavorable reviews".

Adrian Horton of The Guardian gave the film three out of five stars, saying, "A live-action take on the classic animation has effective visual moments and an impactful turn from Tom Hanks but never quite justifies its existence." Richard Roeper of the Chicago Sun-Times gave the film three stars out of four, writing, "Every frame of Pinocchio is filled with rich and lush detail — at times this almost looks like a 3-D film — and the performances, whether live action or voiced, are universally excellent." Danny Leigh of the Financial Times thought that "The animation is now so hyper-advanced, the landscape of the movie so eerily both this and that, it is easy to get confused about where reality stops and ones and zeros take over." Jennifer Green of Common Sense Media gave the film three out of five stars and felt it "boasts an impressive mix of CGI animation and live actors and settings, but the final product feels a little jumbled".

Amy Nicholson of The New York Times was critical of the script: "Geppetto [sings] about his freshly concocted dead son. Someone wished to burden the old whittler with more motivation, and tacked on a dead wife to boot." Christy Lemire of RogerEbert.com called Key's performance "by far the film's highlight", but felt other updates to the story "too often feel empty and add no insight". Alex Godfrey of Empire gave the film two stars out of five, saying, "It's hard to invest much in Geppetto and Pinocchio's relationship when they spend barely any time together. Ultimately, it's all a bit flat, and feels like an exercise. It exists because it can." In a "C" review, Christian Zilko of IndieWire wrote, "While the original story remains undeniably excellent, Pinocchio fails at re-telling it because it ignores its own advice. ... If Disney truly believed that timeless virtue and character were more important than having a shiny new exterior, this remake would never have been made." Patrick Cremona of the Radio Times thought it "never does enough to justify its own existence, failing to improve on the tremendous 1940 animation in any meaningful way." Andrew Barker of Variety was similarly negative, saying, "There may be no strings on this Pinocchio, but there isn't much of a heart in him either."

In 2025, Kotaku and Collider called the film the worst Disney remake in both's list ranking all of the live-action remakes; the former panned the film as "lifeless" and "artificial" while the latter called it "a nightmare to the senses, and disturbingly awkward in every way". TheWrap ranked the film 21st out of the 23 Disney live-action remakes in early 2025, explaining that "Tom Hanks gives a career-worst performance as the toymaker Gepetto, the visual effects — usually the highlight of any Zemeckis enterprise — are roundly unconvincing, and the changes to the story undermine the movie's messaging at nearly every turn."

=== Accolades ===
Award	Date of ceremony	Category	Recipient(s)	Result	Ref.
Golden Raspberry Awards	March 11, 2023	Worst Picture	Derek Hogue, Andrew Milano, Chris Weitz, and Robert Zemeckis	Nominated	
Golden Raspberry Awards	March 11, 2023	Worst Director	Robert Zemeckis	Nominated	
Golden Raspberry Awards	March 11, 2023	Worst Actor	Tom Hanks	Nominated	
Golden Raspberry Awards	March 11, 2023	Worst Supporting Actress	Lorraine Bracco (voice)	Nominated	
Golden Raspberry Awards	March 11, 2023	Worst Screenplay	Screenplay by Robert Zemeckis and Chris Weitz; Based on the 1940 Disney animated film and the novel The Adventures of Pinocchio by Carlo Collodi	Nominated	
Golden Raspberry Awards	March 11, 2023	Worst Remake, Rip-off or Sequel	Pinocchio	Won	
Hollywood Music In Media Awards	November 16, 2022	Best Original Score – Streamed Live Action Film (No Theatrical Release)	Alan Silvestri	Nominated	
Hollywood Music In Media Awards	November 16, 2022	Best Original Song – Streamed Film (No Theatrical Release)	"I Will Always Dance"; Written by Alan Silvestri and Glen Ballard; Performed by Kyanne Lamaya	Nominated	
Golden Reel Awards	February 26, 2023	Outstanding Achievement in Sound Editing – Non-Theatrical Feature	Bjørn O. Schroeder, Leff Lefferts, Randy Thom, Malcolm Fife, Pascal Garneau, Teresa Eckton, Goeun Everett, James Spencer, Chris Frazier, Dee Shelby, Christopher Manning, John Roesch, and Shelley Roden	Nominated	
Visual Effects Society Awards	February 15, 2023	Outstanding Animated Character in a Photoreal Feature	Christophe Paradis, Valentina Rosselli, Armita Khanlarpour, and Kyoungmin Kim (for Honest John)	Nominated	

== See also ==
- Guillermo del Toro's Pinocchio (also released in 2022)
- Geppetto
