= Mangiafuoco =

- The Adventures of Pinocchio character
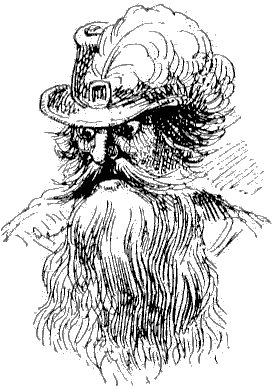
- Mangiafuoco, as illustrated by Enrico Mazzanti
- First appearance: The Adventures of Pinocchio
- Created by: Carlo Collodi

In-universe information
- Species: Human
- Gender: Male
- Occupation: Director of the Great Marionette Theatre
- Nationality: Italian

Mangiafuoco (/ˌmɑːndʒəˈfwoʊkoʊ/ MAHN-jə-FWOH-koh; Italian: [ˌmandʒaˈfwɔːko], literally "Fire-Eater") or Mangiafoco is a fictional character who appears in Carlo Collodi's 1883 Italian book The Adventures of Pinocchio (Le avventure di Pinocchio), serving as the secondary antagonist before redeeming himself. Although in several adaptations of the novel, more antagonistic versions based on the character are usually represented.

== Role ==
He is the theatre director and puppet-master of the Great Marionette Theatre, portrayed as gruff and imposing, but capable of showing kindness and easily moved to compassion, which he expresses by sneezing: after initially wanting Pinocchio to be burned as firewood for ruining one of his puppet shows, he eventually sets him free and gives him five gold coins to give to his father Geppetto.

== In the novel ==
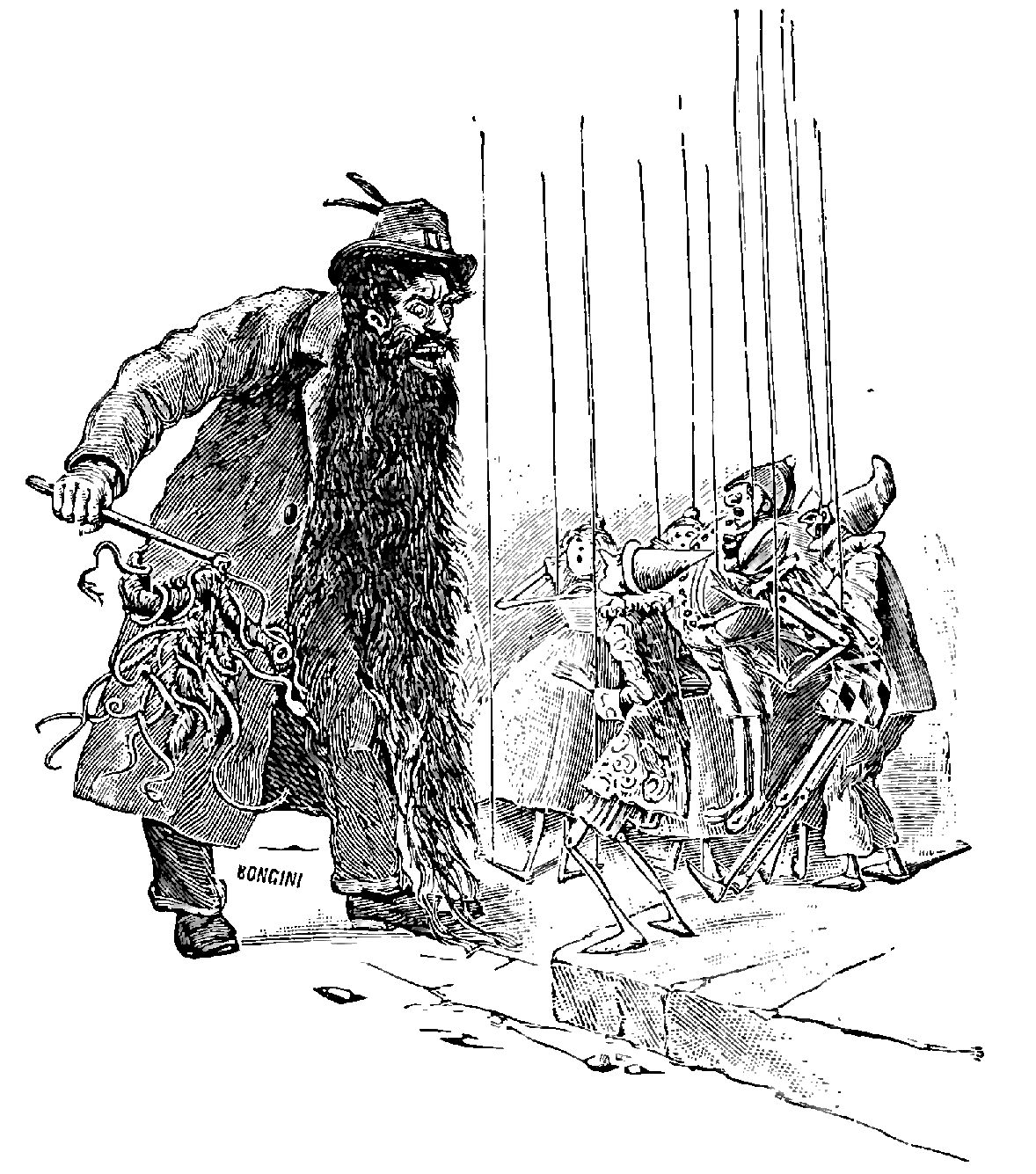
Ruins one of his puppet shows by distracting the other puppets, and demands that Pinocchio be burned as firewood for his roasting mutton.

Mangiafuoco is described as

...a large man so ugly, he evoked fear by simply being looked at. He had a beard as black as a smudge of ink and so long that it fell from his chin down to the ground: enough so that when he walked, he stepped on it. His mouth was as wide as an oven, his eyes were like two red tinted lanterns with the light turned on at the back, and with his hands, he sported a large whip made of snakes and fox tails knotted together.

Though imposing, Mangiafuoco is portrayed as easily moved to compassion, which he expresses by sneezing.

He is first encountered in Chapter X, after Pinocchio ruins one of his puppet shows by distracting the other puppets, and demands that Pinocchio be burned as firewood for his roasting mutton.

Moved by Pinocchio's lamentations, Mangiafuoco decides to burn one of his own puppets, Harlequin, instead. When Pinocchio begs for Harlequin's life and offers to sacrifice himself in Harlequin's stead, he is refused by Mangiafuoco, who upon hearing that he is poor, gives Pinocchio five gold sequins which are later seized by the Fox and the Cat.

== In adaptations ==
=== Karabas Barabas ===
Karabas Barabas
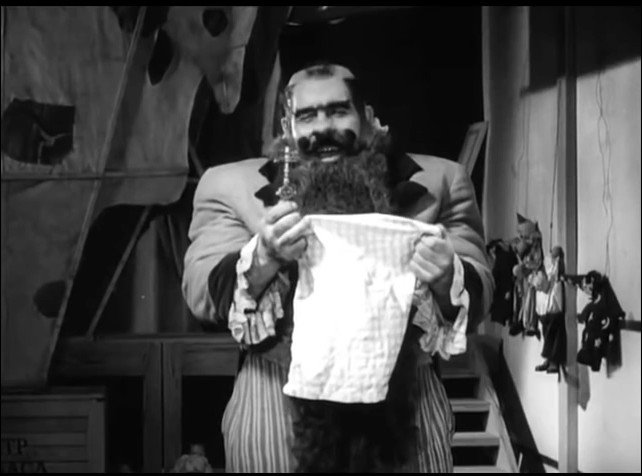
- Karabas Barabas portrayed by Alexey Shchagin in the 1939 film
- First appearance: The Golden Key, or the Adventures of Buratino (1936)
- Created by: Aleksey Nikolayevich Tolstoy
- Portrayed by: Alexey Shchagin (1939 film); Vladimir Etush (1975 film); Fyodor Bondarchuk (2026 film)
- Voiced by: Aleksandr Baranov (1959 film)

In-universe information
- Species: Human
- Gender: Male
- Occupation: Puppeteer
- Nationality: Italian
- Birthplace: Italy

The 1936 Soviet book adaptation The Golden Key, or The Adventures of Buratino by Aleksey Nikolayevich Tolstoy, features a character based on Mangiafuoco and named Karabas Barabas (Russian: Караба́с-Бараба́с). He is the director of a puppet theater and he is the primary antagonist in the tale.

Karabas Barabas has a tendency to accidentally step on his own beard while walking; to prevent this, he tucks the end of his beard into his coat pocket. The puppet theater in Tolstoy's story is commonly interpreted as an allusion to the Vsevolod Meyerhold State Theater of 1920 to 1938, with Karabas Barabas himself as a satirical portrayal of its director Vsevolod Meyerhold, who had a reputation for his strict, even despotic leadership style, demanding from his actors the obedience and precision of puppets. Many actors fled his theater, unable to endure the intense workload and the oppressive working environment. Meyerhold often wore a long scarf whose ends trailed to the ground. To avoid stepping on them, he would tuck the ends into his jacket pocket, much like Karabas Barabas does with his beard.

The character also appears in various adaptations of Tolstoy's story:

- In the 1939 film adaptation The Golden Key, Alexey Shchagin portrayed Karabas Barabas.
- He appears in the 1959 animated film, voiced by Aleksandr Baranov in the original Russian version.
- In the 1975 musical film adaptation, Vladimir Etush played the role.
- In the 2026 musical film adaptation, the role was played by Fyodor Bondarchuk.

=== Stromboli (Disney) ===
Stromboli
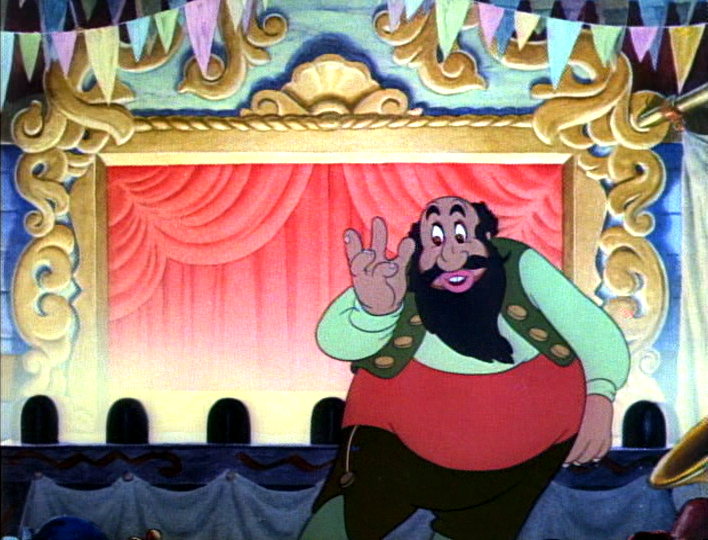
- Stromboli as he appears in Disney's Pinocchio
- First appearance: Pinocchio (1940)
- Created by: Bill Tytla; Walt Disney
- Portrayed by: Giuseppe Battiston (2022 film)
- Voiced by: Charles Judels; Daws Butler (1954 record album); Thurl Ravenscroft (Disney on Parade)

In-universe information
- Species: Human
- Gender: Male
- Occupation: Puppeteer, showman
- Nationality: Italian
- Birthplace: Italy

In the 1940 animated Disney film Pinocchio, Mangiafuoco is renamed Stromboli (in the Italian dub of the film, "Mangiafuoco" is Stromboli's epithet). The character is voiced by Charles Judels (who also voiced the Coachman in the same film), and animated by Bill Tytla. Unlike Mangiafuoco, who meets Pinocchio by chance, Stromboli buys Pinocchio from Honest John and Gideon and earns a great deal of money by showing Pinocchio on stage. Stromboli (whom Honest John refers to as an "old gypsy") is at first portrayed as gruff and rude but kind-hearted, but he gives Pinocchio a metal washer instead of real money, then angrily locks Pinocchio in a cage, stating that once he is too old to work, he will be used as firewood, revealing his true nature as brutal, cruel, vicious, and arrogant. Pinocchio escapes from his carriage with the help of the Blue Fairy and Jiminy Cricket, but is berated for lying to her and ignoring Jiminy's advice.

Like all the villains in the film, the ultimate fate of Stromboli is never stated, revealed or clarified, only implied and left to the viewers to theorize and deduce it, a characteristic typical of other classic and older Disney animated films (like Bambi, The Adventures of Ichabod and Mr. Toad, Cinderella, and One Hundred and One Dalmatians). It's implied that he reacted to Pinocchio's absence in a typical emotional outburst and desperation upon discovering he has lost his "gold mine" too late. He is the first Disney villain whose wickedness is not immediately apparent to the audience, a characteristic that would become increasingly common in Disney movies of the 21st century (like Lyle T. Rourke, King Candy/Turbo, Hans, and Dawn Bellwether).

Stromboli also has cameo appearances in the television series House of Mouse, and its two direct-to-video films, Mickey's Magical Christmas and Mickey's House of Villains. Stromboli is also a meet-and-greet character at Disney Parks.

In the 2022 live-action adaptation, he is played by Italian actor Giuseppe Battiston. In this adaption, Stromboli is served by Fabiana and her marionette Sabina. While Pinocchio and Jiminy Cricket's escape from Stromboli's carriage remains intact, they later encounter Fabiana and Sabina again where they mentioned that Stromboli has been arrested by the Carabinieri for cruelty against his employees and they have taken over his puppet show.

Stromboli appeared briefly in the 2023 short film Once Upon a Studio with archival audio from Judels. He is seen frustratingly banging on a vending machine as Anna and Elsa pass by him. Stromboli appears again with all the characters singing "When You Wish Upon a Star", while all them take a group photo.

==== Reception and analysis ====
Despite his limited screen time, Stromboli is one of Disney's most (in)famous and acclaimed villains. The character has been praised by critics for possessing the ability to instill in audiences both laughter and fear. Art critic Pierre Lambert has stated that "Tytla's innate sense of force is revealed in all its magnitude in the creation of the character of Stromboli," and animation historian Charles Solomon refers to the puppet master as "the grandest of all Disney heavies," while John Canemaker describes Stromboli as "an overweight monster of mercurial moods, capable of wine-soaked, garlic-breathed Old World charm one second, and knife-wielding, chop-you-up-for-firewood threats the next." William Paul drew some parallelism:

It is not too difficult to regard Stromboli as burlesque of a Hollywood studio boss, complete with foreign accent. Disney's own relationship to the Hollywood power structure was always a difficult one, and his distrust of the moguls was well justified by his earliest experiences in the industry.

During the premiere of Pinocchio, Frank Thomas sat in front of W.C. Fields, who, upon Stromboli's entrance, commented that the puppet master "moves too much". Animation historian Michael Barrier further wrote that Stromboli was "[a] poorly conceived character" whose "passion has no roots... there is nothing in Stromboli of what could have made him truly terrifying." Leonard Maltin disagrees, considering Pinocchio's encounter with the showman to be the wooden boy's "first taste of the seamy side of life... (Stromboli) tosses his hatchet into the remnants of another ragged marionette, now a pile of splinters and sawdust, a meekly smiling face the only reminder of its former 'life'." Though the character is Italian, characteristics such as Stromboli's facial expressions, obsession with wealth, and long black 'goat's beard' have led some to make comparisons with Jewish stereotypes (particularly Hollywood moguls); these comparisons have been criticised for being unfounded, with critics noting that all of the major villains in the film are motivated by greed, with this characteristic not being exclusive to Stromboli.

=== Other portrayals ===
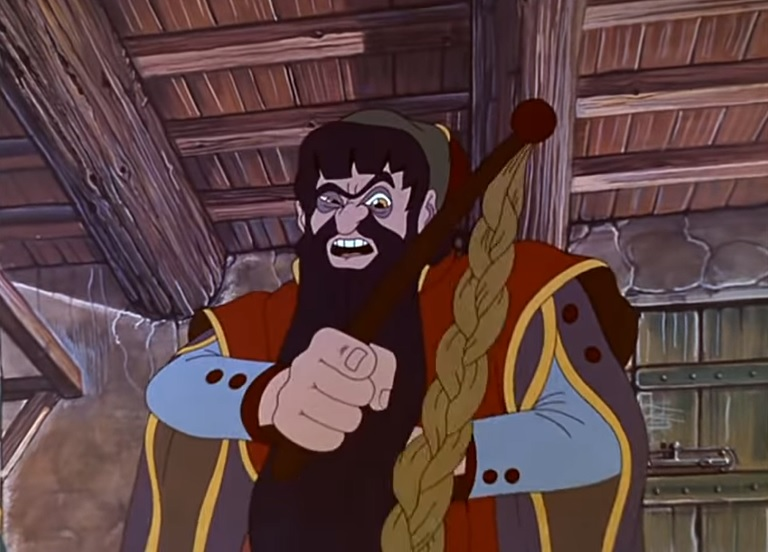
Mangiafuoco as seen in The Adventures of Pinocchio (1972)

- In Giuliano Cenci's 1972 animated film The Adventures of Pinocchio (Un burattino di nome Pinocchio), Mangiafuoco's portrayal is true to the book in design and personality. In the English version he is renamed The Fire-Eater, translation of his original Italian name. He is voiced by Michele Gammino in the Italian version and by Bob Holt in the English dub.
- In Pinocchio's Christmas, a character named Maestro Fire-Eater (voiced by Alan King) is loosely based on Mangiafuoco. Like in the book, his role is small and is made into an antagonist. Maestro Fire-Eater is shown to have a marionette named Julietta who Pinocchio befriends. After Pinocchio fled with Julietta as Maestro Fire-Eater sends the Gendarmerie after him, Pinocchio later left Julietta in the care of Lady Azura.
- He appears in the 1972 miniseries The Adventures of Pinocchio, portrayed by Lionel Stander.
- Filmation's Pinocchio and the Emperor of the Night features a puppet master named Puppetino voiced by William Windom. When Pinocchio runs away to a carnival with the idea of finding work, Puppetino recognises him from when he was a puppet. In a nightmarish sequence, Puppetino turns Pinocchio back into a lifeless, wooden puppet through an unexplained, magical process. It is implied strongly that he has done this to other children also. Puppetino speaks in a cockney accent and is a gaunt, pale-skinned man with a red moustache and hair, thick lips and a cloak. He is also a henchman and servant of the titular Emperor, who later turns on Puppetino for cowardice and turns him into a puppet before he is set on fire.
- In Steve Barron's 1996 live action film The Adventures of Pinocchio, Mangiafuoco (who is played by Udo Kier) is renamed Lorenzini and is portrayed as the main antagonist of the film, encompassing three different villains from Collodi's story: the Puppet Master, The Coachman, and the Sea Monster. He initially adopts Pinocchio into his puppet troupe when he enlists Volpe and Felinet to bring Pinocchio to him. Lorenzini has a craving for chilli peppers, identified as the cause of his "fiery" breath. After Pinocchio accidentally sets Lorenzini's theatre on fire, Lorenzini begins luring bad naughty boys to Terra Magica, where the children inevitably drink cursed water which turns them into donkeys. Lorenzini, during a struggle with Pinocchio, falls into the water and becomes The Sea Monster.
- In the Happily Ever After: Fairy Tales for Every Child adaptation of Pinocchio, the character is called Mr. Buzzard (voiced by Garrett Morris). Just like the Disney version, Red the Fox and Sporty the Cat sell Pinoak to him and Pinoak later escapes from him. In addition, Mr. Buzzard is seen in the shadows as the one who runs Fantastic Island.
- In Geppetto (2000), a television film broadcast on The Wonderful World of Disney, Mangiafuoco (again named Stromboli) is portrayed by Brent Spiner. He is portrayed as an unsuccessful puppeteer who constantly argues with his ventriloquist's dummy and other puppets. He captures Pinocchio in order to use him as the main attraction in his puppet show, thus warning him it will violate a contract he had him sign to perform in every show he holds. When Pinocchio runs away from the show and goes to Pleasure Island, Stromboli sets out to recapture him as well as Geppetto. When Geppetto and Stromboli arrives at Pleasure Island, they were both looking for Pinocchio, only for Stromboli to get kicked out of Pleasure Island while Geppetto learns that the rollercoaster has the dark magic that turns boys into donkeys, as was the case with Pinocchio when Geppetto tries to save him from getting into the rollercoaster, but to no avail. When Pinocchio and Geppetto come home to the toy shop after escaping the whale, Stromboli shows them the contract and wants Pinocchio back with him. Geppetto offers his whole shop in exchange. When the Blue Fairy refuses to help Geppetto save Pinocchio, Geppetto pleads and begs to give him one last chance. The Blue Fairy turns him into a real boy and frightens Stromboli away with her magic.
- Mangiafuoco appears in the 2002 Pinocchio film portrayed by Franco Javarone while his English dub voice was provided by Kevin James.
- In the 2003 Canadian animated film Pinocchio 3000, he is named Scamboli and voiced by British actor Malcolm McDowell.
- In the 2007 film Shrek the Third, a Puppet Master (voiced by Chris Miller) similar to Mangiafuoco appears who refers to Pinocchio as his "star puppet" and is a villainous character like in other adaptations. As Prince Charming rouses the band of villains at the Poison Apple tavern to join him in order to take over Far Far Away so he can become king, he says to the Puppet Master, "Your star puppet abandons the show to go and find his father," his only line is "I hate that little wooden puppet."
  - Though he is not seen, his name is used in the title of the Shrek the Third video-game level "Stromboli's Workshop," in reference to Disney's character, and being mentioned by the name by Pinocchio's copies created by him. A picture of himself could also be seen in the video game level.
- Mangiafuoco appears in the 2008 Pinocchio miniseries, portrayed by Maurizio Donadoni.
- He appears in the 2012 Pinocchio film, voiced by Rocco Papaleo in the Italian version and by Vlasta Vrána in the English dub.
- In the live-action Italian film Pinocchio (2019), co-written, directed and co-produced by Matteo Garrone, Mangiafuoco is portrayed by Gigi Proietti, while his English dub voice is provided by Paolo Marchese. This is the second-to-last film to feature Proietti, but it's the last to be released before the actor's death on November 2, 2020.
- Mangiafuoco was originally set to be voiced by Ron Perlman in the 2022 stop-motion Netflix film Pinocchio, produced, written and directed by Guillermo del Toro. The role rewritten into that of a Fascist official named the Podestà (who is a replacement for The Coachman) and the father of Candlewick. Mangiafuoco's traits were combined with The Fox into the character of Count Volpe (voiced by Christoph Waltz), Mangiafuoco would appear in the film as one of Volpe's circus performers.

== Bibliography ==
Collodi, Le Avventure di Pinocchio 1883, Biblioteca Universale Rizzoli
