= Pinocchio (video game) =

1996 video game

Disney's Pinocchio
- Sega Genesis cover art
- Developers: Virgin Studios London (SNES, Genesis); NMS Software (Game Boy)
- Publishers: Genesis: NA: THQ; EU: Sega; SNES: NA/EU: Nintendo; JP: Capcom; Game Boy: NA: Black Pearl Software; EU: Nintendo
- Director: Dan Marchant
- Producers: Dave Vout; Patrick Gilmore; Paul Curasi
- Designer: Dan Marchant
- Programmer: Mike Ball
- Artist: Kevin Oxland
- Composer: Allister Brimble
- Platforms: Super NES, Game Boy, Genesis/Mega Drive
- Release: Genesis/Mega Drive: NA/EU: October 1996; Super NES: NA: November 11, 1996; EU: 1996
- Genres: Puzzle, platform, adventure
- Mode: Single-player

Disney's Pinocchio is a platform puzzle adventure game created as a collaboration between Disney Interactive and Virgin Interactive Entertainment. It was released in 1996 for the Game Boy, Super NES, and Sega Genesis, and is based on the 1940 Disney animated film Pinocchio. The game was published by Capcom in Japan on the same year. A Sega 32X version of the game was made and completed, but was not released due to the add-on's limited popularity.

== Storyline ==
The game uses intertitles between levels to convey the story, in the form of a children's storybook. Pinocchio travels from home and must choose to go to School or Easy Street (though the choice does not affect the level order). He then travels from Stromboli's marionette show to Pleasure Island and then into the sea, where he saves Geppetto from inside Monstro and they escape.

== Reception ==
Reception

Review score
Publication	Score
GamePro	(GB) 3.0/5

Coach Kyle of GamePro gave the Genesis version a negative review, commenting that both the gameplay design and controls are shallow and rudimentary, the character animations are stiff, and the graphics lack detail. He concluded: "What a shame that such a long-awaited game, with such a famous story as a foundation, should turn out to be so disappointing". (Note: GamePro gave the Genesis version three 2/5 scores for graphics, control, and fun factor, and 3/5 for sound.) The Feature Creature, however, gave the Game Boy version a mixed review, saying it simply translates the simplistic and easy levels from the Genesis version into portable form. (Note: GamePro gave the Game Boy version three out of five.)
