= The Coachman =

- The Adventures of Pinocchio character
- Il conduttiere del carro, as illustrated by Enrico Mazzanti
- First appearance: The Adventures of Pinocchio
- Created by: Carlo Collodi

In-universe information
- Alias: The Little Man
- Species: Human
- Gender: Male
- Occupation: Coachman
- Nationality: Italian

The Coachman (Italian: il Conduttore del Carro), also known as The Little Man (l'Omino, or more precisely l'Omino di Burro, 'the Buttery Man'), is a fictional character and a major antagonist from Carlo Collodi's 1883 book The Adventures of Pinocchio (Le avventure di Pinocchio), in which he appears in chapters XXXI and XXXIII.

== Description ==
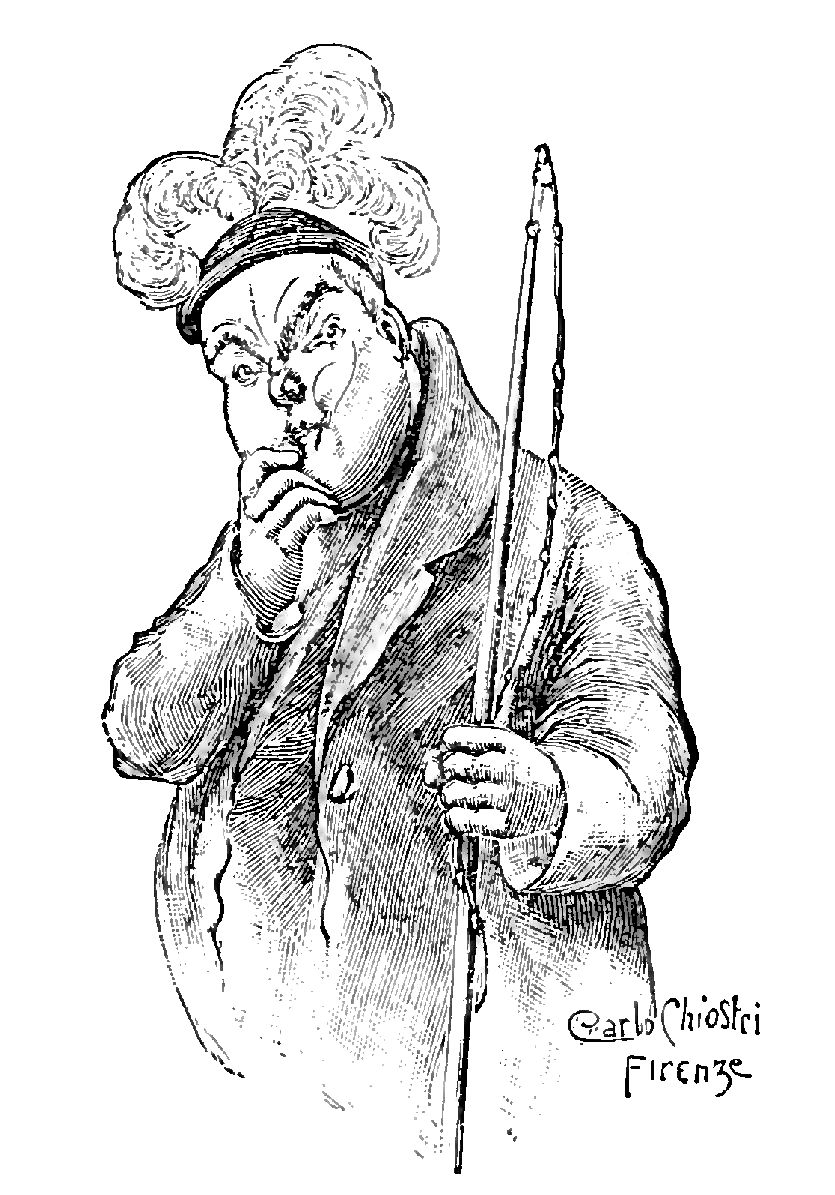
The Coachman as illustrated by Carlo Chiostri (1902)

The Coachman, due to his mellifluous manners and convincing and reassuring voice, lures lazy boys onto his coach. The coach is pulled by a team of twenty-four donkeys, used to take the boys to the Land of Toys. It is a place where every child can have fun, without having to listen to adults. To ensure the coach is silent, its wheels are wrapped and the donkeys wear white boots.

He is described by Collodi as: "a little man, broader than he is tall, tender and greasy like a ball of butter, with a rosy face, a small, constantly laughing mouth and a thin, adorable voice of a cat wishing all the best to its master". He is a diabolical, perverse and sometimes even sadistic character: to punish his donkeys he bites off their ears. While the coach speeds towards the Land of Toys the coachman sings: "All night they sleep / and I never sleep...".

After five months of plentiful toys and entertainment, the boys (including Pinocchio and Candlewick) are transformed into donkeys. Subsequently Collodi explains that the Coachman's job is to take children to the Land of Toys, await their transformation into donkeys and sell them at fairs and markets, a job that has made him a millionaire in just a few years.

== In other media ==
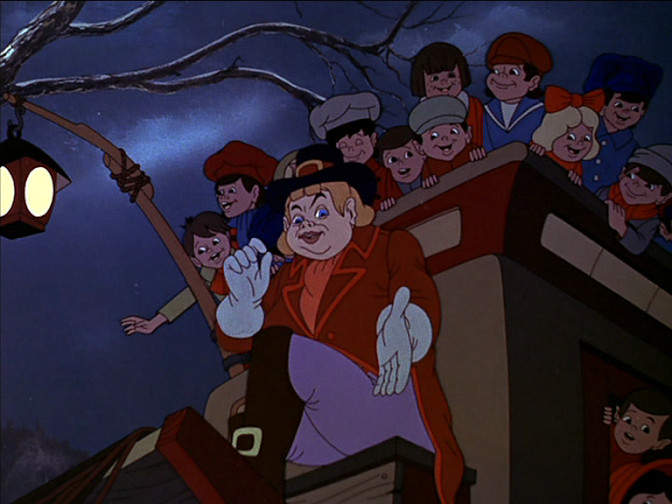
The Coachman in the 1940 Disney version (left) and the 1972 Cenci version (right)
- The Coachman appears in the 1940 film adaptation by Walt Disney Productions, in which he is voiced by Charles Judels (who also voiced Stromboli in the same film) with a Cockney accent. He is an evil man or humanoid creature who first appears in the Red Lobster Inn with Honest John and Gideon, to whom he proposes, by offering them a large salary, to bring him some listless children to take to Pleasure Island, a place that arouses fear in the two scoundrels. The Coachman is also served by silhouetted minions with ape-like arms. In the film the Coachman's fate is unknown, but in a deleted scene, the Coachman notices Pinocchio's escape and hires Honest John and Gideon to apprehend him dead or alive, but the two are stopped and arrested by the carabinieri. In the video game adaptation, he hinders Pinocchio's escape as a boss and is kicked off a cliff.
- The Coachman appears in Giuliano Cenci's 1972 animated film The Adventures of Pinocchio, voiced by Gianni Bonagura in the original Italian version (the English voice dubber is uncredited). He is portrayed more closely to the book than his Disney counterpart. The Coachman works alone and is portrayed as an effeminate and alluring character with a high-pitched voice, who easily tricks Pinocchio and Candlewick into coming to the Land of Toys. However, his punishment for disobedient donkeys is omitted.
- In Luigi Comencini's 1972 miniseries, the Coachman is portrayed by Riccardo Billi and has a melancholy appearance. This is the only adaptation that retains the Coachman's punishment for donkeys.
- In the 1972 anime series episode "Pleasureland", Clarissa, the poppy witch and sworn enemy of the Oak Fairy, takes on the Coachman's role. She takes the form of a little girl to lure rascals into Pleasureland, where she leads them into her malevolent dimension of torture and horror.
- In Steve Barron's 1996 film, the character's role is merged with that of Mangiafuoco and The Terrible Dogfish into Lorenzini, portrayed by Udo Kier. Pinocchio accidentally sets Lorenzini's theater on fire, causing Lorenzini to change career and begin luring unruly children to Terra Magica where the children inevitably drink cursed water, turning them into donkeys. During a struggle with Pinocchio, Lorenzini falls into the water and turns into a sea monster, which swims out to the ocean.
  - In Geppetto, the Coachman is replaced by a Pleasure Island ringmaster (portrayed by Usher). He manages to escape retribution despite Geppetto discovering his plan.
  - The Coachman cameos in the House of Mouse episode "Mickey vs. Shelby", as an audience member sitting with Honest John and Gideon.
- In Roberto Benigni's 2002 film, the Coachman, portrayed by Luis Molteni (voiced by Erik Bergmann in the English dub), is depicted in a similar manner to Cenci's adaptation. In this version, his clients are made aware of how he provides the donkeys, themselves witnessing the transformation of the boys when they are asleep.
- In the Compagnia della Rancia's 2003 musical, the Coachman is reimagined as a school bus driver, just as the Land of Toys is reimagined as a school (called "Dunce High School"). In this version he is also the director of the circus where Pinocchio and the other children, transformed into donkeys, are made to perform.
- In the 2004 animated film Pinocchio 3000, the Coachman and Mangiafuoco are merged to form the film's main antagonist Mayor Scamboli. A rich robotics tycoon who hates noisy children and the nature they so protect, he has a playground built at the suggestion of his beloved daughter to keep them out of his way. Then inspired by a remark by Pinocchio, he modifies one of the attractions to transform children into robots, into which he also introduces Geppetto, his rival and adversary.
- In the 2007 animated film Bentornato Pinocchio, the Coachman (voiced by Vittorio Amandola) is the main antagonist and, after avoiding his punishment, hires the Cat and the Fox to take revenge on Pinocchio and kidnap Santa Claus. At the end of the film, the man is punished by the Blue Fairy: he ends up transformed into a stick of butter and eaten by the villagers.
- In the 2013 French miniseries, the Coachman, portrayed by Axel Neumann, is represented faithfully to the novel, except for his more tramp-like appearance and the magic whip that allows him to transform children into donkeys. When Pinocchio and his friends escape the circus director to whom the man is indebted, he sets out to look for them, finding Pinocchio's two friends (who have returned to normal with him) on the beach and tries to kidnap them, but Geppetto's neighbors arrive to save them, breaking his whip and consequently his curse.
- In Matteo Garrone's 2019 film, the Coachman is portrayed by Nino Scardina in a manner faithful to his book counterpart, while his English dub voice is provided by Giancarlo Magalli.
  - Luke Evans portrays the Coachman in the 2022 live-action remake of the 1940 animated film. He appears younger and shabbier than the original film, has his own song, and, similarly to the video game, pursues Pinocchio when he tries to escape, then believing him dead when he dives from a cliff.
- In Guillermo del Toro's 2022 stop-motion animated film, the Coachman's role is taken by the Podestà (voiced by Ron Perlman), Benito Mussolini's officer in Geppetto's village and Candlewick's stern father. Parallel to how the Coachman wanted to profit from the children he transformed into donkeys, the Podestà wants to turn children, especially his son and the immortal Pinocchio, into soldiers at an elite youth training camp. He is later killed when an Allied airplane bombs the camp.

== Bibliography ==
- Collodi, Le Avventure di Pinocchio 1883, Biblioteca Universale Rizzoli
