= The Terrible Dogfish =

- The Adventures of Pinocchio character
- Il Terrìbile Pesce-càne swallows Pinocchio, as drawn by Enrico Mazzanti.
- First appearance: The Adventures of Pinocchio
- Created by: Carlo Collodi

In-universe information
- Species: Giant Dogfish

The Terrible Dogfish (Italian: il Terribile Pesce-cane) is a shark-like sea-monster, which appears in Carlo Collodi's 1883 book The Adventures of Pinocchio (Le avventure di Pinocchio) as the final antagonist. It can also mean “The Terrible Shark,” since pesce-cane translates to both shark and dogfish. It is described as being larger than a five-story building, a kilometer long (not including its tail) and sporting three rows of teeth in a mouth that can easily accommodate a train. So fearsome is its reputation, that in Chapter XXXIV, it is revealed that the Dogfish is nicknamed "The Attila of fish and fishermen" (L'Attila dei pesci e dei pescatori).

== In the novel ==
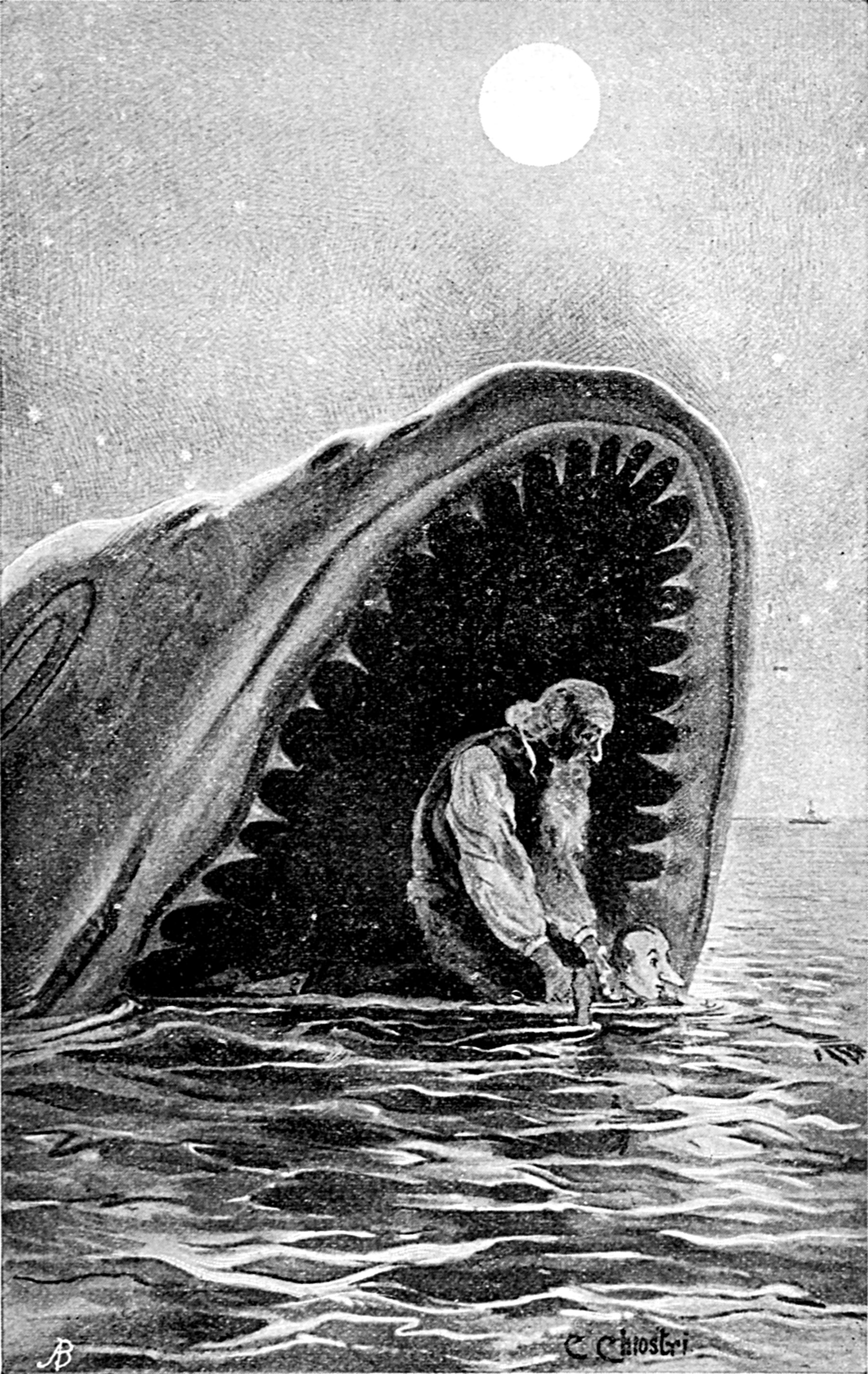
Pinocchio carries Geppetto on his back and swims out of its mouth. A 1902 drawing by Carlo Chiostri.

The Dogfish is first mentioned in Chapter XXIV, when Pinocchio, searching for his creator, Geppetto, is informed by a dolphin that he has likely been swallowed by the Dogfish which "...for some days has come to wreak extermination and desolation in our waters".

The Dogfish is later mentioned in Chapter XXVI by Pinocchio's school friends on the Island of the Busy Bees (Isola delle Api Industriose), who tell him that it has been sighted on the coast, to coax him away from school.

The Dogfish makes its first appearance in Chapter XXXIV when Pinocchio, recently transformed from a donkey to his puppet form, has entered the sea to escape from his former owner. The Fairy with Turquoise Hair, in the form of a turquoise mountain goat, warns him of the Dogfish too late, and it swallows him whole, along with a tuna whom he befriends. He discovers Geppetto, who reveals that he has been trapped inside the Dogfish for two years, surviving on ship supplies swallowed by it. When the Dogfish is revealed to suffer from asthma, a condition that forces it to sleep with its head raised from the water and its mouth open, Pinocchio carries Geppetto on his back and swims out of its mouth. When Pinocchio's strength begins to fail, the tuna helps them to reach the shore.

== Disney version ==
Monstro
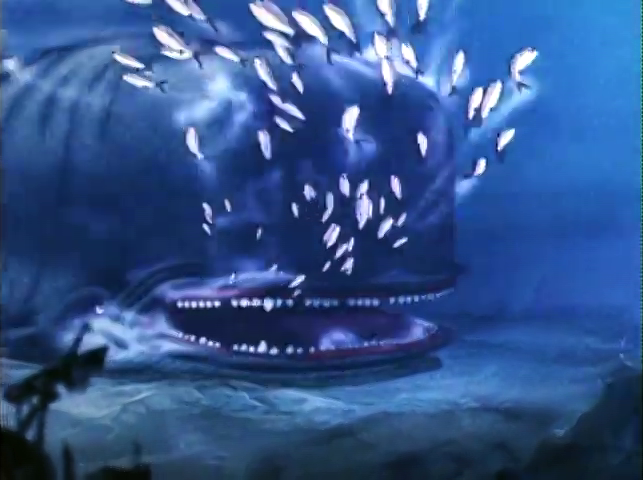
- Monstro as portrayed in Disney's Pinocchio.
- First appearance: Pinocchio (1940)
- Designed by: Joe Grant

In-universe information
- Species: Sperm whale

In the 1940 Walt Disney film Pinocchio, the character is named Monstro (which is Portuguese, Esperanto, and archaic Italian for "monster") and is portrayed as an aggressive and man-eating sperm whale, in contrast with the "gentle giants of the sea" in real life, with massive jaws, both of which have sharp teeth, and a grooved underside like a rorqual, similar to the whale in the novel Moby-Dick. He is first mentioned by Jiminy Cricket in a message from the Blue Fairy about Geppetto, who, sailing to find Pinocchio on Pleasure Island, has been swallowed by him. They search for him, but are frustrated upon mentioning his name to the sea creatures, which causes them to flee in terror. After finally discovering him asleep, he suddenly awakens upon noticing a school of tuna swimming nearby and gives chase, eventually swallowing them and Pinocchio (but not Jiminy) before closing his mouth and falling asleep again. Inside his belly, Pinocchio discovers and reunites with Geppetto before suggesting that they start a fire in order to make Monstro sneeze them out, though Geppetto worries that this plan would make Monstro mad. The smoke wakes him up, prompting him to sneeze them out of his mouth. Unfortunately, just as Geppetto feared, this serves only to infuriate him after drinking lots of water to put the fire out, and he pursues them, using surprise attacks in attempts to kill them, but fails. Eventually, when Pinocchio pulls Geppetto into a hole in a cliff, Monstro leaps into the air, aiming to re-consume them, but ends up smashing against the cliff on impact. It is unknown what exactly happened to him afterwards, but it can be presumed that he was either killed by the impact, or survived and gave up his pursuit.

Monstro was animated by Wolfgang Reitherman, the go-to man for action sequences among Disney's Nine Old Men.

=== Bonkers ===
Monstro makes a guest star appearance in a Bonkers comic story titled "Whale of a Tale", published in the December 1994 issue of Disney Adventures. In this story, he is a polite actor who played a role in Pinocchio but has not found work in the movies since then; he is duped by a gang of crooks, posing as a movie company, into breaking into banks for them to rob, and, upon finding out the truth, helps Bonkers catch the criminals.

=== Fantasmic! ===
Monstro also plays a notable role in the Disneyland version of Fantasmic!, and also has a smaller role in the Dancing Bubbles scene in the Disney's Hollywood Studios version.

=== Kingdom Hearts ===
Monstro appears in the video game Kingdom Hearts as both a supporting character and a world, where Pinocchio and Geppetto temporarily live inside him until being rescued. Riku enters Monstro's body and sends the Heartless to kidnap Pinocchio, intending to use his heart to rescue Kairi. After Kingdom Hearts is sealed, Monstro presumably returns to his world.

Monstro reappears in Kingdom Hearts: Chain of Memories as a figment of Sora and Riku's memories. In the Final Mix version of Kingdom Hearts: Birth by Sleep, Monstro appears as a boss in the Mirage Arena. In Kingdom Hearts 3D: Dream Drop Distance, Monstro appears as a boss in Prankster's Paradise.

=== Once Upon a Time ===
In ABC's Once Upon a Time, Monstro makes a brief appearance in the episode "The Stranger", in which his Disney role is reiterated. His design has many similarities to the Devil Whale found in various other tales.

=== Pinocchio (2022) ===
In the 2022 live-action remake adaptation of Walt Disney Pictures Pinocchio, Monstro plays a similar role. This version is a chimeric creature with characteristics of whales, sharks and cephalopods.

== Portrayals in other media ==
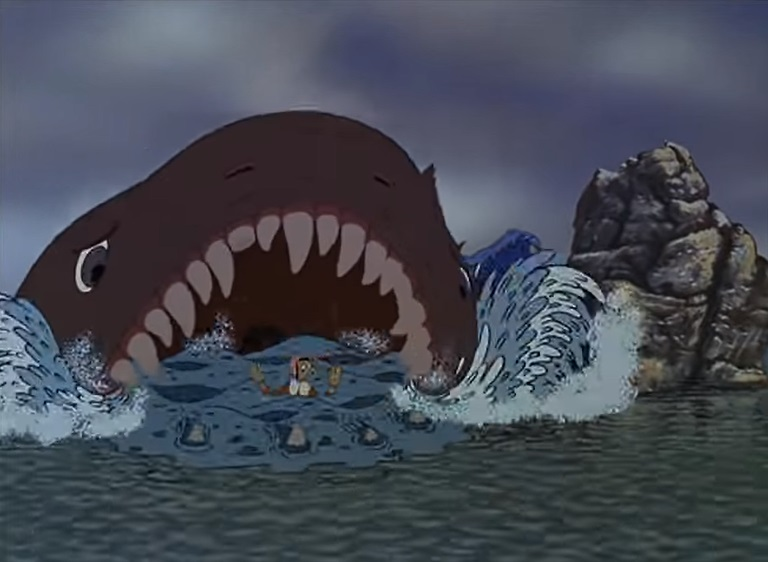
In The Adventures of Pinocchio.

- In The Adventures of Pinocchio (1911), directed by Giulio Antamoro, the Dogfish is depicted as a sperm whale.
- In Giuliano Cenci's 1972 animated film The Adventures of Pinocchio, the Dogfish is portrayed similarly to that of the book, but not mentioned before its initial appearance.
- The Dogfish makes its traditional appearance in Pinocchio (1976 TV program).
- In the 1984 episode of Faerie Tale Theatre, the Dogfish is represented as a gigantic orca.
- In Steve Barron's 1996 New Line Cinema live action film The Adventures of Pinocchio, the Dogfish (identified as the "sea monster") is combined with The Coachman and Mangiafuoco into the villainous Lorenzini (played by Udo Kier), who is transformed into a humongous sea monster being an exact mixture of the novel's Dogfish and Disney's Monstro after being submerged in the cursed water which turned boys into donkeys.
- In Disney's 2000 live action television musical film Geppetto (film), the Dogfish is a sperm whale like Monstro in its 1940 animated original.
- In the 2002 Italian film Pinocchio, the Dogfish is depicted as a colossal great white shark.
- In the anime manga series MÄR, Pinocchio's Guardian ARM Fastico Galleon is an enormous whale-like creature based on Monstro of the Disney film.
- The Dogfish appears in the 2012 Pinocchio film adaptation portrayed as a gigantic piranha.
- In the 2019 live-action film adaptation of Pinocchio, the Dogfish is portrayed in a more faithful appearance to that of the book with more features to fit that of a sea-monster.
- In the 2022 stop motion Netflix film Pinocchio that was produced, written and directed by Guillermo del Toro, the Dogfish is depicted like a Cryptid with grotesque features such as fins belonging to anglerfish and a tail akin to kaiju.
- In Dropout's actual-play Dungeons & Dragons show Dimension 20: Neverafter, the Terrible Dogfish appears in episode 13 ("Terror on Toy Island") as an enormous, whale-like monster, covered in barnacles and the broken masts of ships.

== Bibliography ==
- Collodi, Le Avventure di Pinocchio 1883, Biblioteca Universale Rizzoli
