= The Adventures of Pinocchio (1996 film) =

1996 fantasy film

- American theatrical release poster
- Directed by: Steve Barron
- Screenplay by: Sherry Mills; Steve Barron; Tom Benedek; Barry Berman
- Based on: The Adventures of Pinocchio by Carlo Collodi
- Produced by: Heinz Bibo; Raju Patel; Jeffrey M. Sneller
- Starring: Martin Landau; Jonathan Taylor Thomas; Rob Schneider; Udo Kier; Bebe Neuwirth; David Doyle; Geneviève Bujold
- Narrated by: David Doyle
- Cinematography: Juan Ruiz Anchía
- Edited by: Sean Barton
- Music by: Rachel Portman
- Production companies: The Kushner-Locke Company; Dieter Geissler Filmproduktion; Pangaea Holdings; Twin Continental Films
- Distributed by: CineVox (through Warner Bros.; Germany) (Note: Distributed under the Warner Bros. Family Entertainment label.); Metropolitan Filmexport (France); PolyGram Filmed Entertainment (United Kingdom); New Line Cinema Savoy Pictures (United States and Canada)
- Release dates: July 26, 1996 (United States); October 3, 1996 (Germany)
- Running time: 94 minutes
- Countries: Germany; France; United Kingdom; United States
- Language: English
- Budget: $25 million
- Box office: $15 million

The Adventures of Pinocchio is a 1996 fantasy film directed by Steve Barron and based on the original 1883 novel of the same name by Carlo Collodi. Barron collaborated with Sherry Mills, Tom Benedek and Barry Berman on the screenplay. It was a German, French, British and American venture produced by The Kushner-Locke Company, Pangaea Holdings and Twin Continental Films. It stars Martin Landau and Jonathan Taylor Thomas. The film was a critical and commercial failure. A sequel, The New Adventures of Pinocchio, was released straight to video in 1999.

== Plot ==
In a forest in the late 18th century, Italian woodcarver Geppetto carves a heart into a pine tree, expressing his secret love for a woman named Leona. Years later, Geppetto finds the remains of the tree and carves a marionette out of it, naming him Pinocchio. Due to the heart's magic, Pinocchio comes to life and starts to wander the village.

Pinocchio soon meets a pair of thieves, Volpe and Felinet, who work for Lorenzini, a sinister theater director and puppet master. Lorenzini tries to purchase Pinocchio, but Geppetto refuses to sell him. Pinocchio sneaks out the window and follows a group of local boys to the school.

Once there, Pinocchio gets into a fight with the naughty Lampwick and when he lies about it, his nose grows longer and the teacher kicks him out of the class. Next, Pinocchio ends up causing damage to a local bakery, and Geppetto is arrested as a result. Pinocchio flees home, meeting a talking cricket, Pepe, who tells Pinocchio to behave and stay out of trouble to become a real boy. The next day, Pinocchio and Geppetto are put on trial at court. Lorenzini enters, offering to pay off the debt if Pinocchio is given over to him. Geppetto reluctantly agrees.

Pinocchio becomes the star of Lorenzini's productions and is given gold coins as payment. Pinocchio rescues several of Geppetto's puppets from being burnt by Lorenzini, unintentionally setting the theater on fire. Escaping to the forest, Pinocchio considers moving into the dead tree that he was carved from, until a woodpecker attacks him. He then runs to a nearby church, meeting again with Volpe and Felinet, who con him out of his pay of gold coins.

After Pinocchio receives a scolding from Pepe, he spots a stagecoach passing by, carrying Lampwick and other boys, travelling to Terra Magica, a hidden fun-fair for boys to do as they please. Drinking the water of Terra Magica turns them into donkeys. The fun-fair turns out to belong to Lorenzini, who sells the donkeys off to circuses and farms. Pinocchio, who has only swallowed enough water to grow donkey ears, has Lampwick kick Lorenzini into the cursed water, transforming him into a sea monster and forcing him to flee into the ocean. The boys and donkeys escape the fun-fair, and Pinocchio reunites with Leona at the beach before setting out to find his father at sea.

After trying and failing to find Geppetto out at sea, Pinocchio and Pepe are consumed by the sea monster. Both are reunited with Geppetto inside his stomach, which both Pepe and Geppetto describe as smelling like "rotten chili peppers". As they attempt to escape the sea monster, they find that his throat is too small to enter through. Pinocchio lies to extend his nose and make the passage in the monster's throat larger, causing his nose to break. The monster starts to choke, spitting Geppetto and Pinocchio out, before suffocating and sinking to the depths. On land, Pinocchio apologizes to Geppetto for not being a real boy, but Geppetto tells him that he is real to him.

As Pinocchio begins to cry, the tears land on the heart carving and the same magic that brought him to life transforms him into a real boy. Pinocchio tricks Volpe and Felinet, into drinking the cursed water and turns them into a real fox and real cat. Back at home, Geppetto and Leona are now married while Pinocchio goes off to play with Lampwick, who among many others has turned back into a boy after performing many good deeds.

== Cast ==
- Martin Landau as Luca Antonio Renaldo Geppetto Baldini, an impoverished Italian puppet maker who accidentally gives Pinocchio life after carving him from an enchanted log.
- Jonathan Taylor Thomas as Pinocchio, the eponymous character and main protagonist of the film. He seeks to learn about right and wrong so that one day he will become a real boy.
  - His puppet form was puppeteered by Mak Wilson, Robert Tygner, Michelan Sisti, Bruce Lanoil, William Todd-Jones, Ian Tregonning, Peter Hurst, Gillie Robic, Susan Dacre, and Phil Woodfine
- David Doyle as the voice of Pepe, a Talking Cricket who serves as Pinocchio's conscience.
- Geneviève Bujold as Leona, a friend of Geppetto with whom he is secretly in love.
- Udo Kier as Lorenzini, a villainous puppeteer who takes custody of Pinocchio and later transforms into a sea monster. He is based on Mangiafuoco, the Coachman, and the Terrible Dogfish from the original novel.
- Bebe Neuwirth as Felinet, a scheming con artist always looking for the next profit. She is based on the Cat from the original novel.
- Rob Schneider as Volpe, Felinet's dim-witted partner and sidekick. His name means "fox" in Italian and he is based on the Fox from the original novel.
- Corey Carrier as Lampwick, Pinocchio's troublemaking friend.
- Marcello Magni as the Baker, an unnamed baker who works inside a bakery in the village.
- Dawn French as the Baker's Wife, an unnamed baker who works inside a bakery in the village.
- Richard Claxton as Saleo, Lampwick's companion and sidekick who kicks Pinocchio in class at school.
- John Sessions as the Professor, an irritable teacher who Pinocchio inadvertently annoys while attending one of his classes.
- Jean-Claude Drouot as the Magistrate, a court official who threatens to send Geppetto to a debtors' prison for Pinocchio's irresponsible behavior.
- Jean-Claude Dreyfus as the Foreman.
- Michael Gregory as Capone, Lorenzini's henchman at Terra Magica.
- Jerry Hadley as the voice of the Supreme Judge in "Il Colosso".
- Gary Martin (uncredited) as the voice of the Giant in "Il Colosso".
- Sissel as the voice of the Princess in "Il Colosso".

== Reception ==
Critically, The Adventures of Pinocchio received a 35% rating on Rotten Tomatoes from 26 reviews with the consensus: "The Adventures of Pinocchio is an admirably faithful adaptation of the source material, but it may be too frightening for younger viewers – and too dull for older ones."

On the television review series Siskel & Ebert, Roger Ebert expressed disappointment with the film, while Gene Siskel praised the special effects, and remarked that he believed the film to be a faithful adaptation of the book, as opposed to Disney's interpretation, which strayed significantly from it. Ebert gave the film two out of four stars and said, "The story is told with visual grace, but lacks excitement. Even Pinocchio's little cricket friend seems more like a philosopher than a ringmaster. Smaller children may be caught up by the wonder of it all, but older children may find the movie slow and old-fashioned." Joe Leydon of Variety gave the film a mostly positive review, writing "The Adventures of Pinocchio is a well-crafted and gently charming version of the classic 1883 novel by Carlo Collodi. Unfortunately, this live-action, non-musical adaptation must compete with vivid (and, in many cases, video-enhanced) memories of Disney's beloved 1940 animated feature."

In her seminar "The Persistent Puppet: Pinocchio's Heirs in Contemporary Fiction and Film", Rebecca West found The Adventures of Pinocchio to be relatively faithful to the original novel, although she noted major differences, such as the replacement of the Blue Fairy by the character of Leona. Lawrence Van Gelder of The New York Times, gave the film a negative review, writing "Despite the interesting differences between the latest Pinocchio, which mixes animated and live characters, and the wholly animated Disney version, the new film simply doesn't generate much magical enchantment."

== Soundtrack ==
No.	Title	Writer(s)	Performer(s)	Length
1.	"II Colosso"	Brian May, Lee Holdridge	Jerry Hadley, Sissel Kyrkjebø, Brian May, (from Queen) Just William	7:36
2.	"Luigi's Welcome"	Spencer Proffer, David Goldsmith (lyricist), Holdridge	Hadley	2:33
3.	"All for One"	Craig Taubman	The Morling School Ensemble with Jonathan Shell	2:27
4.	"Kiss Lonely Good-Bye (with orchestra)"	Stevie Wonder	Stevie Wonder	4:39
5.	"Hold On to Your Dream (with orchestra)"	Wonder	Wonder	4:21
6.	"Theme from Pinocchio"	Rachel Portman		7:17
7.	"Lorenzini"	Portman		3:22
8.	"Terra Magica"	Portman		3:56
9.	"Pinocchio Becomes a Real Boy"	Portman		5:10
10.	"Kiss Lonely Good-Bye (Harmonica with orchestra)"	Wonder	Wonder	4:39
11.	"Pinocchio's Evolution"	Wonder	Geppetto's Workshop	3:46
12.	"What Are We Made Of"	May	May, Sissel	3:41
13.	"Hold On to Your Dream"	Wonder	Wonder	6:00
14.	"Kiss Lonely Good-Bye"	Wonder	Wonder	5:02
Total length:				64:38

== Sequel ==
A sequel was released in 1999 called The New Adventures of Pinocchio. Landau reprised his role as Geppetto, while Kier was recast as Lorenzini's wife, Madame Flambeau. Gabriel Thomson played the title role, replacing Jonathan Taylor Thomas. It was shot in Luxembourg City, Luxembourg.

=== Home media ===
A PAL transfer of The New Adventures of Pinocchio was released on DVD in Australia by Flashback Entertainment, Cat. No. 15631.
