= Land of Toys =

Fictional location

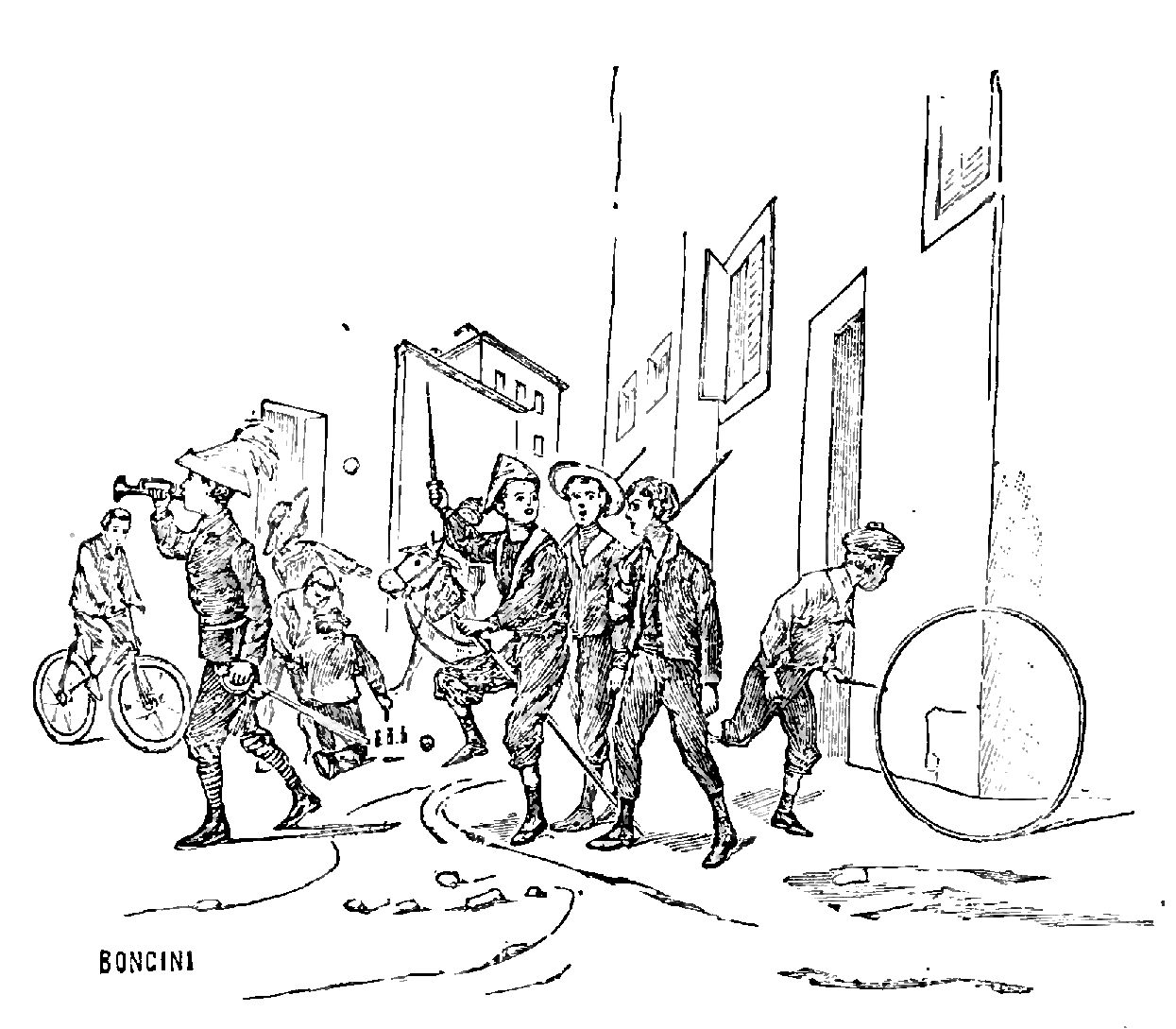
- Illustration from the book of some boys that play in the Land of Toys
- First appearance: The Adventures of Pinocchio (1883)
- Created by: Carlo Collodi
- Genre: Fantasy

In-universe information
- Other name: Pleasure Island; Land Where Dreams Come True; Playland; Terra Magica; Fun Forever Land; Magic Land; Toyland; Funland

The Land of Toys (Italian: il paese dei balocchi) is a fictional location in the Italian novel The Adventures of Pinocchio (1883) that is disguised as a haven of freedom and anarchy for children, but is eventually discovered to be far more sinister.

To its unsuspecting visitors (like Pinocchio and Candlewick), the Land of Toys appears to be a fantastic haven for wayward children to do whatever they want with no consequences or law; to act as they please without fear of punishment. However, the truer and more sinister purpose of the Land of Toys is eventually revealed: by means of a disease called "donkey fever" that affects children who never study or work, the children turn physically into donkeys (in Italian culture, the donkey is symbolic of ignorance, stupidity, goofiness and labor). Subsequently, they get sold by The Coachman to different places.

Described as a "land of Cocagne", the novel implies that it is at least as large as a township, although the size and nature of the location is unclear, as in Italian paese can mean 'country' or 'land', but also 'town' or 'village'.

Along with Land of Toys, other names for the land include: Playland, Funland, Toyland, Pleasure Island (Disney film adaptation, 1940, Geppetto, 2000, and Disney live-action remake, 2022) in which it is depicted as a large amusement park on an island; Land Where Dreams Come True (Pinocchio and the Emperor of the Night, 1987),Terra Magica (The Adventures of Pinocchio, 1996), Fun Forever Land (Pinocchio, 2002), Fantastic Island (Happily Ever After: Fairy Tales for Every Child, 1997), and Luilekkerland.

== The Land of Toys in the original novel ==
The original representation of the Land of Toys mixes the aspects of a morality tale with those of social critique.

Children (depending upon the translation of the original Italian, the novel has included both boys and girls or only boys) are lured there by the Coachman with the promise of never having to go to school or work again and being able to spend their whole time having fun, and the graffiti on all the walls is proof of that.

Described as a scene of pandemonium, the children there were described as playing with nuts, playing with battledores, playing with balls, riding velocipedes, riding wooden horses, playing hide and seek and chasing each other. Some were dressed in straw while eating lighted tow, doing some reciting, singing, walking on their hands, trundling hoops, dressing as generals commanding others dressed as soldiers, laughing, shouting, calling out, clapping their hands, whistling, or clucking as if they were pretending to be hens laying eggs.

There were also canvas theaters erected which was crowded by children from morning to evening. The walls of some house had messages on them that said, "Long live playthings! We will have no more schools! Down with arithmetic!" There was also fine sentiments in bad spelling.

Finally, after months of reckless abandonment, the true purpose of the land is revealed. As a result of their immodest behavior and ignorance, and what is treated almost as a natural consequence, they become donkeys (in Italian culture, the donkey is symbolic of ignorance, stupidity, goofiness and labor). Pinocchio learned of the "donkey fever" from a marmot.

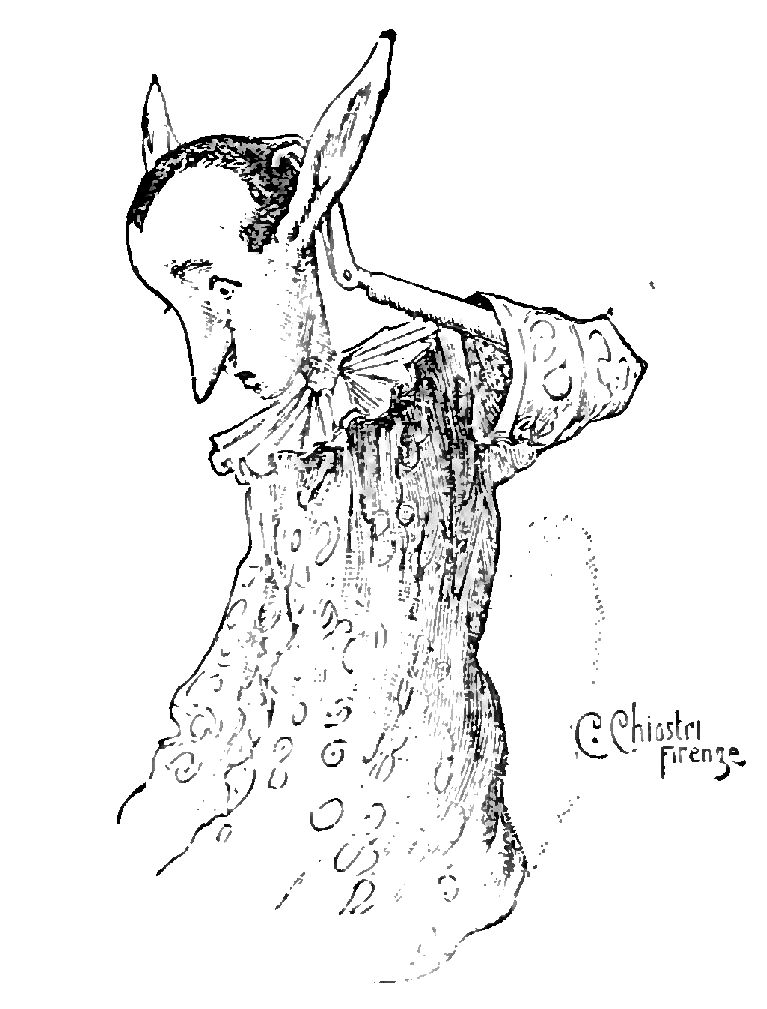
The first sign of the transformation.

The transformation is not instantaneous, but usually happens in the span of a single day:

- First the children's ears sprout out into those of a donkey. This first change seems to be an early symptom, for it is always several hours before the complete change begins.
- Then in a process which the book seems to describe as painful, the children are forced to the ground in a quadrupedal stance, unable to stand upright any longer. It is at this point of animalistic behavior that the children's minds seem to transform into that of unthinking beasts; they begin to lose speech and run around chaotically, braying, kicking, and violently rolling until fully transformed, usually in such a violent manner as to seem crazed. However, a piece of their human minds seems to remain in the fact that they are aware that they are being humiliated.
- Then, as they lash out in asinine instincts, children's hands and feet become hooves, their faces transform into equine muzzles, and they grow hair all over their bodies.
- The last thing that happens to them is the growth of donkey tails; this is considered the most humiliating segment of the transformation in the fact that it signals their absolute and irreversible transformation into donkeys.

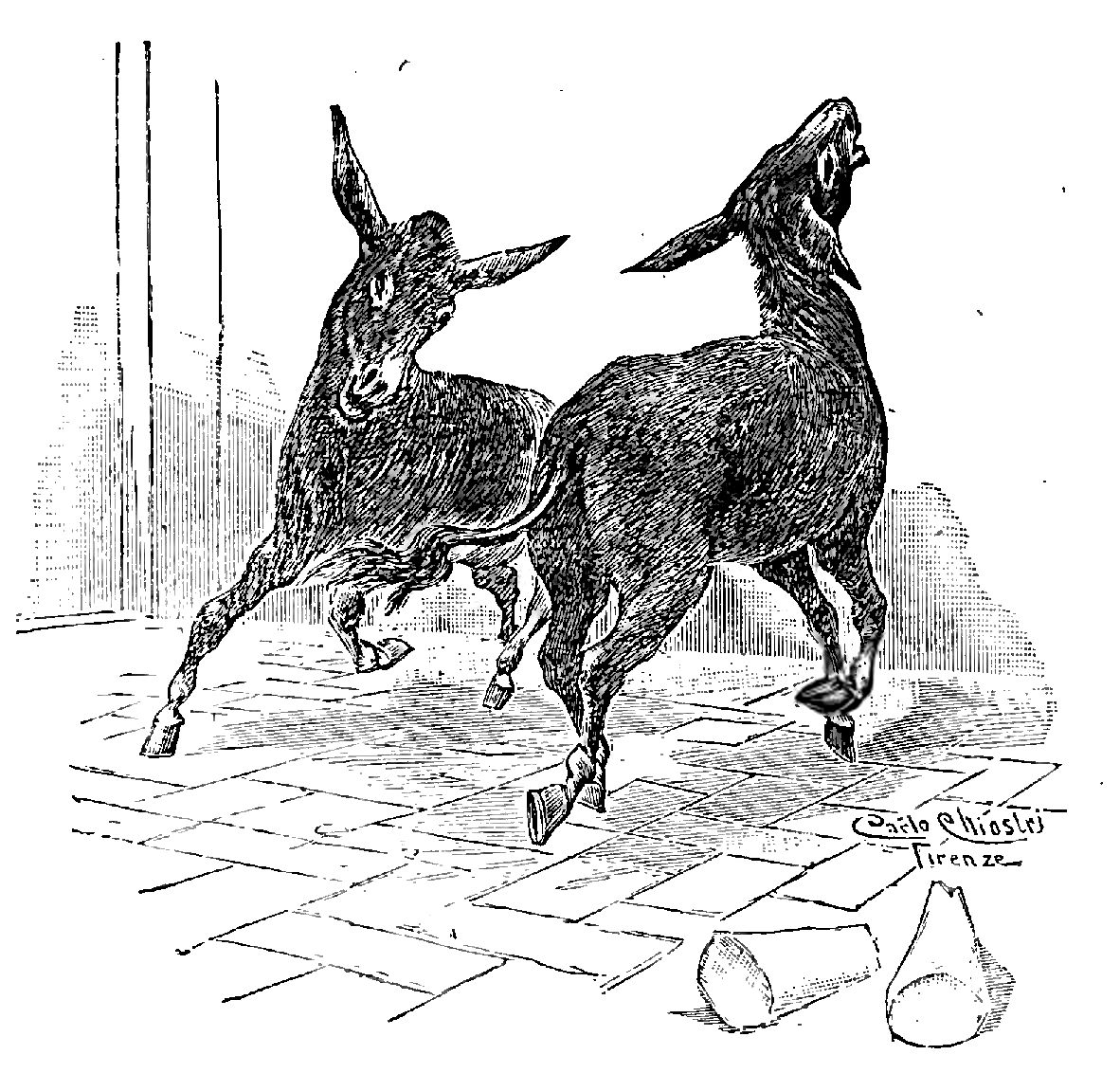
Their laughter soon turns to animal brayings and the two transform into a pair of donkeys.

When the children become donkeys, the Coachman and his minions would sell these donkeys to farms, salt mines, circuses, and markets. The Coachman sells Pinocchio to a circus and sells Candlewick to a farmer whose donkey just died.

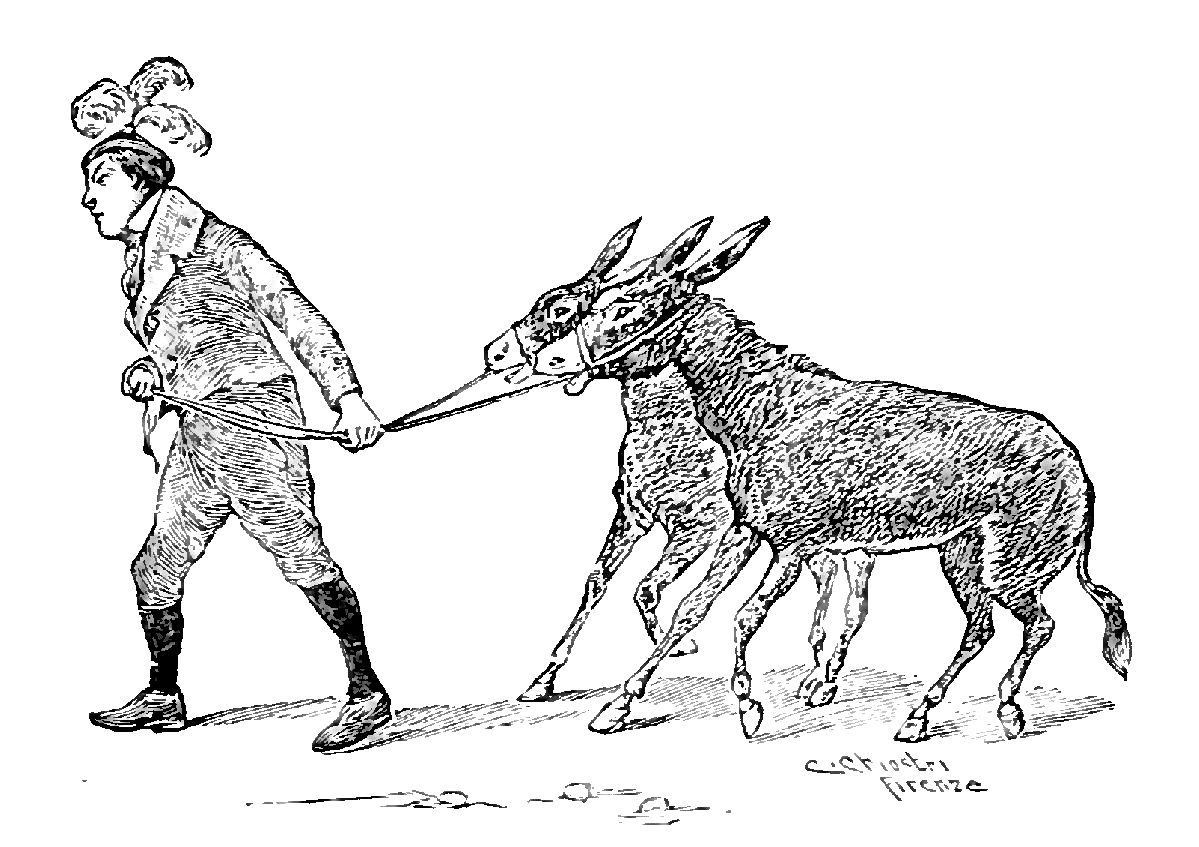

Some commentators have said that the sudden, yet completely clean (no graphic, obscene, or overtly scary descriptions are used) transformation can seem terrifying to younger children. Adaptations of the scene have been hailed as too frightening for certain age groups.

When framed in the context of the late 19th century, the chapters set in the Land of Toys also serve as social commentary: abandoning school means securing oneself a future with no other way to make a living but through hard back-breaking labor, and there are plenty of people (like the ruthless Coachman) who will always try to take advantage of that. Alternatively, it could be taken to mean that those who avoid education and responsibility and lead irresponsible lives end up making metaphorical and colloquial "jackasses" of themselves.

== Adaptations ==
In some film versions of the story, Pinocchio is not fully transformed into a donkey. In the 1940 Disney version, for example, the transformation is arrested by his escape from the island after he's grown donkey ears and a tail. In The Adventures of Pinocchio (1996), Pinocchio is not affected by the Terra Magica's cursed water as it leaks out holes in his (wooden) chest, due to a scuffle between Lampwick and an unidentified boy over a gun earlier at the funfair game. He grows donkey ears after riding the roller coaster. In Geppetto (2000), the roller coaster is again the cause of Pinocchio's transformation and the puppet does fully take on donkey form. However, he turns back into human form when he later jumps overboard in an attempt to save Geppetto from being swallowed by the whale.

=== Pleasure Island ===
==== Pinocchio (1940) ====
In Disney's animated film Pinocchio (1940), the Land of Toys is renamed Pleasure Island, though the Italian dub keeps the name "paese dei balocchi" from the novel. In the film, the boys visit Pleasure Island voluntarily, with the promise of unlimited fun, freedom, and privilege, all free of cost. It is clear, however, that Pleasure Island has a terrible reputation despite its name as Honest John and Gideon react in horror at the name when they meet the Coachman at the Red Lobster Inn as "the law" has declared Pleasure Island illegal and worries about what will become of them if they were to get caught. There, the boys ride on the carnival rides and are encouraged to do naughty deeds like making meals of cake, pies, dill pickles, and ice cream, breaking stuff at a Model Home that is opened for destruction, fighting in the Rough House, drinking, smoking, and gambling. Food and tobacco was made freely available. In short, the park was designed for boys to "make jackasses of themselves." The nature of the Coachman and of Pleasure Island itself are shown as preternatural and inherently evil. While the boys are enjoying themselves, the Coachman orders his henchmen, shown as terrifying silhouettes with ape-like arms and no distinguishing features, to close and lock the entrance before ordering them to get below and get the crates ready as the Coachman chuckles "Give a bad boy enough rope and he'll soon make a jackass of himself!"

The transformation into a donkey is not instantaneous. When the boys arrive on the island, they remain human for some time, even days, as their "jackass" deportment must build up sufficiently for the curse to activate. Since Jiminy Cricket does not engage in such acts at all while looking for Pinocchio, he remains completely unaffected the entire time (or maybe it is simply because he is a bug). The first indication of the transformation is when the boy's laughter is replaced with a donkey's braying (in Lampwick's case, he discovers this upon gaining the ears, tail and head), followed by the growth of donkey ears and a tail. The head, torso, and extremities come next, after which the boy is then forced into a quadrupedal stance. The final change is losing the ability of human speech and, as seen with the particular case of Lampwick, the total loss of humanity.

Once the boys are transformed, the Coachman and his minions bundle them off to be sold into slave labor, either working in salt mines or performing in circuses. Before the donkeys leave Pleasure Island, the Coachman asks their names to make sure they have lost their ability to speak, which signifies they are fully transformed. It is clear however that the speechless donkeys still retain human minds and intelligence as they are apparently able to understand the Coachman's commands. The donkeys that are fully transformed and can no longer speak (as in Lampwick's case) are stripped of their clothes, hurled into wooden crates, and then sold off. The ones that can still talk (as in the case of one named Alexander) are locked in a pen until the transformation finishes or to make sure they don't gain the attention of the outside world. The talking donkeys now realize what has happened and want the Coachman to let them go home, but the Coachman silences them with his whip and then snarls "Quiet! You boys have had your fun! Now pay for it!" This alerts Jiminy, who had been watching all this, that Pinocchio is in danger. Some donkeys are not sold. Instead, they are used to pull the Coachman's carriage.

After Lampwick transformed, Pinocchio and Jiminy escape from Pleasure Island and dive into the ocean before the Coachman or his minions can see them.

Unlike in the original text where the transformation would automatically complete itself once started, the curse in the film occurs gradually. It can also be slowed down or completely stopped by reduced misbehavior. This was seen when Lampwick, one of the worst-behaved boys, completely changed into a donkey and lost all humanity within two minutes of beginning his transformation. Conversely, Pinocchio decides not to drink beer or smoke any longer (thinking that indulging in the drink and cigars were causing Lampwick's transformation, or more likely that they were causing Pinocchio to hallucinate). It can also be stopped by leaving the island; Pinocchio escaped with only a pair of donkey ears and tail and does not transform any further for the rest of the film. This was also a shortcut on the filmmaker's part, in that it allowed them to skip over some chapters of the original novel. It should also be noted that when the Blue Fairy turned Pinocchio into a real boy, his donkey ears and tail disappear, showing that the Blue Fairy's magic is one possible way of reversing the transformation.

Another difference from the original story is that while Collodi's Land of Toys or Toyland is a mysterious, if not even legendary, though real, place on land not present on any maps, Disney's Pleasure Island is in fact an island and a well-known and even illegalized place with a notorious and infamous reputation.

At some point, Geppetto finds out that Pinocchio is on Pleasure Island and ventures out to sea to rescue him, but is swallowed by Monstro which sets up the climax of the film.

This version of Pleasure Island, or at least a location inspired by it, appears in Kingdom Hearts 3D: Dream Drop Distance in Pinocchio's world, Prankster's Paradise. The Coachman, his henchmen, Lampwick, and the other boys do not appear while Pinocchio, Jiminy Cricket, and the Blue Fairy do. However, the curse is still included.

==== Geppetto (2000) ====
Pleasure Island is shown once more in the 2000 TV musical Geppetto. After Pinocchio escapes from Stromboli's puppet show, even though Stromboli kept him under a contract he signed, he boards a stagecoach full of boys to Pleasure Island. While Stromboli failed to get into Pleasure Island to pursue Pinocchio since he's an adult as adults are not allowed there, Geppetto managed to sneak in. There, young boys destroy property, pig out on sweets, play in the mud, run wild, steal toys, and play pool. In this version, a roller coaster turns the boys into donkeys much like in the 1996 film The Adventures of Pinocchio where they turn into donkeys the moment they pass through its doors.

==== Once Upon a Time (2017) ====
Pleasure Island appears in the twelfth episode of the sixth season of the fantasy drama Once Upon a Time. There is no mentioning of the donkey spell in this show. According to Captain Hook, Pleasure Island has dealings with Neverland. At the time when King George was training Prince James to become a knight, Prince James fled from his training and ended up on Pleasure Island. With help from Rumplestiltskin, James' biological father Robert tracked him there. Upon being led to James by Pinocchio, Robert chased after James through Pleasure Island where they ran into King George and his men who had Robert arrested as both of them are removed from Pleasure Island.

==== Pinocchio (2022) ====
Pleasure Island appears in the 2022 Pinocchio film. The film shows that young girls have also been picked up by the Coachman to go there. There, the kids overeat and have food fights at "Sky's the Limit," steal objects from "Shop 'N Lift", wreck "De Grade School", play with fireworks, hold up insulting signs while saying what's written on them at "Contempt Corner" which gets projected onto four screens, and break clocks in "Clock Stoppers," bothering Pinocchio. The rides include "Give Me a Break" where a roller coaster car jumps over a missing track and "Sugar Mountain" which is made of candy that anyone can slide down. The Coachman is assisted by the Vapor Monsters who catch the transformed children, remove the clothes from their donkey forms, and place them in crates with the shipment in question being bound for the salt mines. Geppetto learned of Pinocchio being on Pleasure Island by Sofia the Seagull who gives him an advertisement about it. He is shown to be familiar with it as he considers Pinocchio being there a "big crisis". After Lampwick transforms into a donkey, Pinocchio and Jiminy evade the Coachman and his Vapor Monsters by diving into the ocean.

==== Walt Disney World Resort ====
There was a shopping district, with many night clubs and bars, in Disney Springs at Walt Disney World Resort under the title of Pleasure Island. Though it is never explicitly stated that the name came from Pinocchio, due to Disney's animated film it is quite plausible that this is the case. The shopping district's backstory was entirely unrelated to Pinocchio, establishing it as the reclaimed headquarters of an eccentric industrialist and explorer named Merriweather Adam Pleasure that disappeared in the 1940s.

=== Pinocchio and the Emperor of the Night ===
In the 1987 Filmation animated movie Pinocchio and the Emperor of the Night, there is a similar realm called The Land Where Dreams Come True, which is part of the larger 'Empire of the Night', home of the titular villain. Rather than a physically tangible place like the Land of Toys or Pleasure Island, it is a surreal, extra-dimensional location housed within, what seems from the outside, a decadent steam ship. The moral sentiment focuses less on the idea of the consequences of stupidity as the concept of being careful not to throw away one's freedom in pursuit of pleasures. The realm is one of illusion and surrealism, apparently able to morph itself into representations of a person's fears or wishes; in the case of Pinocchio, this is seemingly to be a famous entertainer. Similarly, children are able to drink alcohol, play with many fabulous toys, and indulge in their dearest wishes. It is revealed that the price is to be turned into a lifeless, wooden puppet and an eternal prisoner of The Emperor afterwards. Pinocchio initially surrenders his freedom via a paper contract, but, realizing the power of his choice, defies The Emperor and escapes. The Emperor and his realms are implied to be destroyed by this.

=== The Adventures of Pinocchio ===
The Land of Toys is featured in The Adventures of Pinocchio (1996) by the name "Terra Magica" (Italian for 'Magic Land'). After Pinocchio's initial adventures, he ends up wandering in the woods where he encounters the human thieves Volpe and Felinet who trick him out of his money. After this betrayal, he is then lured onto a carriage driven by a sinister-looking coachman who takes him to Terra Magica with a load of other boys (including Pinocchio's friend Lampwick). Terra Magica is actually owned by the evil Lorenzini, who is luring the boys to the place with promises of fun and then turning them into donkeys through drinking the park's cursed water while riding on a roller coaster.

The transformation of boys into donkeys takes place in the span of a few minutes as the roller coaster still roars down the track, giving the sequence an ominous and foreboding atmosphere. The roller coaster is built in such a way that the boys' screams of joy and delight are timed perfectly by a loop in the track to force the cursed water into their mouths. Pinocchio, who had received holes in his wooden body earlier in the film, is spared. It was revealed earlier in the film that the cursed water transforms its drinker into an animal symbolic of his or her behavior. Therefore, the boys' "jackass" behavior causes them to actually physically transform into jackasses. The first revelation of this fate happens when, instead of screams of thrills and joy, Lampwick brays like an ass. After Lampwick's strange bray, the other boys in the car point out a donkey's tail growing out of Lampwick's pants and flapping in the wind. Then the other boys in the car begin to bray uncontrollably as their ears become like those of a donkey. Next, Lampwick's head morphs into a half-donkey-half-human face as he lets out an extremely realistic bray (compared to the previous human-sounding one). Suddenly, the boys begin to grope awkwardly with their hands as they become hooves. Finally with one more screaming bray (this time completely animalistic), Lampwick becomes a complete donkey. It seems that the transformation is somehow timed perfectly to coincide with the end of the roller coaster. This could either be a way to somehow stimulate the transformation into fruition faster, or just to keep them inside and hidden while they transform in order to keep it from the other children in Terra Magica. Whatever the reason, the transformation always seems to completely finish by the end of the ride. Therefore, the new boys have absolutely transformed into donkeys (somehow their clothes also seem to disappear without explanation) by the time they enter the donkey holding cave at the end of the ride. The roller coaster cars seem built not only with the boys in mind but also to fit standing donkeys as well. The donkeys simply walk out of the car at the end of the ride, seemingly unaware of what had happened to them.

Lorenzini's evil schemes are thwarted when Pinocchio reveals his plans to the other boys in the park and encourages Lampwick (turned into a donkey) to knock Lorenzini into the Park's cursed water, transforming him into a humongous sea monster. Around the end of the movie, Volpe and Felinet are tricked into drinking the water by the human Pinocchio. He tells them that if they drink the water while holding a rock, it will transform it into pure gold. As a result, the two thieves are turned into a real fox and a real cat (though this scene happens offscreen). It said that the boys who were turned into donkeys were turned back to boys after doing hard and honest work.

==== PC game ====
The PC/DVD-ROM game based on the film has a scene that takes place in Terra Magica as the main characters, a boy named Candlewick and a girl named Lumina, look for Pinocchio. In the game, Lumina and Candlewick are tricked into boarding the roller coaster and therefore are subjected to only a fraction of the curse since they had not fully engaged in "jackass" behavior or drunk all of their water. Both Candlewick and Lumina lied and were extremely naughty, but only Lumina engaged in the full "jackass" activities; however, it may not have had a full effect on Lumina because she was a girl, though this is never confirmed. Perhaps one must drink a certain amount of the water to be fully affected, but this is also never confirmed. Whatever the reason, Lumina and Candlewick are only transformed halfway into donkeys and still retain human, as evidenced by Lumina saying that she understands Lorenzini's trick by looking at the half-transformed Candlewick and stating, "Lorenzini's trick is that he gets you to act like Jackasses, so that you turn into Jackasses." She is also the only one of the two to bray like an ass, which seems to confirm her more jackass-like behavior.

=== Italian films ===
In both films, the place plays the same role as the novel version.

==== Pinocchio (2002) ====
In the 2002 Italian film Pinocchio, the Land of Toys is referred to as Fun Forever Land in the English dubbed version and Playland in the English subtitled version.

==== Pinocchio (2019) ====
In the English version of the 2019 Italian film Pinocchio, it is referred to as Land of Toys.

=== Guillermo del Toro's Pinocchio (2022) ===
The Land of Toys is reimagined as an Italian fascist military youth camp in Guillermo del Toro's Pinocchio The film depicts Pinocchio being forced to train for war as the Podestà (the film's version of the Coachman) believes that Pinocchio will be the perfect soldier because he cannot die. The boys are figuratively transformed rather than literally. Pinocchio befriends the Podestà's son Candlewick who is scared of disappointing his father. After a training game between two teams led by Pinocchio and Candlewick ends in a tie, the Podestà orders Candlewick to shoot Pinocchio. Candlewick refuses and finally stands up to his father. The boot camp is then bombed by Allied aircraft, killing the Podestà, while Candlewick and the other boys flee. Their fate is left unknown as Pinocchio loses contact with them.

=== In other media ===
- The Pleasure Island theme was taken up again by science fiction author Cory Doctorow in his short story "Return to Pleasure Island", where it is told from the perspective of cotton-candy-vending Golems.
- The 1990 film Teenage Mutant Ninja Turtles appears to pay tribute to Pleasure Island by showing an abandoned warehouse run by the antagonistic Foot Clan, being a place of underage drinking, smoking, gambling, blasting offensive music, playing violent video games, learning martial arts, and how to steal.
- In the Happily Ever After: Fairy Tales for Every Child adaptation of Pinocchio, the Land of Toys is replaced with Fantastic Island where uninterrupted sleep turns the children that are taken there into donkeys.
- In the 1965 novel Dunno on the Moon by Nikolay Nosov, any vagrants on the Moon are sent to the so-called Fools' Island, where a combination of primitive entertainment and bad air eventually turns them into sheep.
