= Stephen Messer =

Stephen Messer may refer to:

- Stephen Messer (author)
- Stephen Messer (entrepreneur)
