= Frankenstein (soundtrack) =

2025 soundtrack by Alexandre Desplat

Frankenstein (Soundtrack from the Netflix Film)

Film score by Alexandre Desplat
- Released: November 7, 2025
- Recorded: 2025
- Studios: Abbey Road Studios, London
- Genre: Film score
- Length: 1:44:50
- Label: Netflix Music
- Producer: Alexandre Desplat

Alexandre Desplat chronology
Jurassic World Rebirth (2025)	Frankenstein (2025)	The Social Reckoning (2026)

Frankenstein (Soundtrack from the Netflix Film) is the soundtrack album to the 2025 film Frankenstein directed by Guillermo del Toro and starring Oscar Isaac, Jacob Elordi and Mia Goth. The film score is composed by Alexandre Desplat and released through Netflix Music on November 7, 2025.

== Development ==
"There's always this thing I like to say: A good score balances function and fiction. Some scores are more function than fiction. This one needed fiction to be showing something else."

— Alexandre Desplat at the Deadline Hollywood Sound & Screen event

In January 2025, it was announced that Alexandre Desplat who previously worked with del Toro on The Shape of Water (2017) and Pinocchio (2022), would compose the musical score for Frankenstein. At the Cannes promotional event in May 2025, Desplat noted that del Toro's cinema will be lyrical so as the music, which meant that he would write an emotional score over horror music. He considered this adaptation as the "third movement of the triptych" calling it a "long adagio with a poco a poco crescendo".

Though del Toro wanted to show the creature having more deadly violence with much physical power, he insisted Desplat to look for the fragility and his suffering musically, calling him a "delicate" creature despite the brutality and monstrous ability, due to his sensitive nature. Desplat further admitted that audience would like this creature. Hence, he wanted to use violin as the primary instrument for the creature, so that it would provide the desired vulnerability for that character. Norwegian player Eldbjørg Hemsing played the violin portions. With the creation of the creature, del Toro depicted Victor as an artist through his dressing and body language. Hence, Desplat created his theme which he incorporated with other themes through his music. He further uses ensemble orchestra and choir to compose the melodic themes and had written around 100 minutes of music for the film.

Desplat admitted del Toro pushed him to go boundaries to be bold with the music, where he wanted to go "restrained and very French" but del Toro wanted a "more Mexican" sound to connect with the creature. He consistently worked with del Toro to figure out the overall aesthetic of the score and how the complex dramatic arc would be unraveled in its music and discussed on whether the aesthetic should be Baroque, Romantic or modern Electronica but none of them matched their vision for the sonical palette that led Desplat to create a "morphed object" that fuses modern and classical elements. He considered the score as a window to the soul of each character, and moments where the music stands in stark contrast to the events happening on the scene. He noted the creation of the monster as one such moment, where the score travels into the mind of Victor's creation bringing another perspective to that scene.

== Release ==
The first track from the album "Fire" was released on October 9, 2025. Frankenstein (Soundtrack from the Netflix Film) was released through Netflix Music on November 7, 2025, the same day as the streaming premiere. A vinyl edition is scheduled to be released through Mutant.

== Track listing ==
All music is composed by Alexandre Desplat.

No.	Title	Length
1.	"Frankenstein"	1:12
2.	"Explosion"	3:31
3.	"Victor's Tale"	1:25
4.	"Burning Angel"	2:56
5.	"Mother Dies"	2:22
6.	"William and Father"	3:41
7.	"Lecture"	3:35
8.	"Meet Harlander"	3:32
9.	"Elizabeth"	3:58
10.	"The Castle"	3:36
11.	"Victor in Love"	1:21
12.	"Victor & Elizabeth"	2:52
13.	"God's Design"	1:32
14.	"Symmetry"	0:59
15.	"Body Building"	4:19
16.	"The Tower"	7:02
17.	"Awakening"	1:27
18.	"Everything Is New"	3:33
19.	"Elizabeth Meets the Creature"	1:48
20.	"Floating Leaf"	2:28
21.	"Harlander's Body"	0:55
22.	"Fire"	3:15
23.	"Creature's Tale"	3:23
24.	"Hunters"	2:04
25.	"Family Life"	4:11
26.	"Wolves"	1:42
27.	"A Friend"	4:40
28.	"Recollection"	1:28
29.	"Return to the Tower"	3:09
30.	"A Good Man"	2:29
31.	"A Merciless Life"	1:36
32.	"Confrontation"	6:00
33.	"Laying to Rest"	2:39
34.	"Don't Delay"	1:22
35.	"Tent & Dynamite"	2:19
36.	"Forgiveness"	3:35
37.	"Eternity"	2:54
Total length:		1:44:50

== Reception ==
Peter Debruge of Variety wrote "Alexandre Desplat's baroque score, on the other hand, makes up for it in grandeur." Glenn Kenny of RogerEbert.com wrote "Alexander Desplat's score is appropriately insistent." Amy Nicholson of Los Angeles Times called it a "swirling orchestral score". Stephanie Zacharek of Time wrote "Alexandre Desplat's score, swelling at the precise moments when we might like to be left alone with our feelings, often feels intrusive." Robbie Collin of The Daily Telegraph wrote "Alexandre Desplat's score grows unnervingly chirpy".

David Rooney of The Hollywood Reporter wrote "the ears are massaged by a muscular orchestral score that's among Alexandre Desplat's most ravishing work." Steve Pond of TheWrap wrote "Alexandre Desplat's music is stately and elegant enough that we don't mind that it's accompanying scenes of the doctor sawing off limbs and dissecting bodies." Lindsey Bahr of Associated Press and Pete Hammond of Deadline Hollywood called it an "appropriately epic" and "exceptional and very large score". Dana Stevens of Slate wrote "Alexandre Desplat's richly orchestrated symphonic score, make for one of the movie's most satisfying stretches."

Bilge Ebiri of Vulture noted that the film is "accompanied by a seemingly never-ending Alexandre Desplat score". Tim Grierson of Screen International wrote "composer Alexandre Desplat drapes the proceedings in a soaring orchestral score that heightens the story's horror and tragedy, proving particularly affecting in the film's later stretches as Victor and the creature, despite being locked in a life-or-death battle, begin to grasp their shared, cursed destiny." Chris Bumbray of JoBlo.com called that Desplat's "memorable score" elevates the film. Matthew Turner of NME wrote "the film is further heightened by a terrific score from Alexandre Desplat".

== Additional music ==
The film features the following pieces of music:

- Jonathan Scott – "Rondeau (Abedelazer)'' (written by Henry Purcell)
- Johann Sebastian Bach – "The Well-Tempered Clavier, Book 1: Prelude And Fugue No. 17 in A Flat Major''
- Wolfgang Amadeus Mozart – "String Quartet No. 4 in C Major: Allegro''

== Charts ==
Chart performance for Frankenstein (Soundtrack from the Netflix Film)
Chart (2026)	Peak position
US Top Classical Albums (Billboard)	4
US Top Classical Crossover Albums (Billboard)	4
US Top Current Album Sales (Billboard)	47

== Release history ==
Release history and formats for Frankenstein (Soundtrack from the Netflix Film)
Region	Date	Format(s)	Label(s)	Ref.
Various	November 7, 2025	Digital download; streaming	Netflix Music	
Various	January 9, 2026	LP	Mutant	
Various	February 13, 2026 (deluxe edition)	LP	Mutant	

== Accolades ==
Award	Date of ceremony	Category	Recipient(s)	Result	Ref.
Hollywood Music in Media Awards	November 19, 2025	Score – Feature Film	Alexandre Desplat	Nominated	
Academy Awards	March 15, 2026	Original Score	Alexandre Desplat	Nominated	
