= Guillermo del Toro's Pinocchio =

2022 film by Guillermo del Toro and Mark Gustafson

- Release poster
- Directed by: Guillermo del Toro; Mark Gustafson
- Screenplay by: Guillermo del Toro; Patrick McHale
- Story by: Guillermo del Toro; Matthew Robbins
- Based on: Pinocchio by Carlo Collodi (Note: The film takes inspiration from an illustrated edition featuring art by Gris Grimly, who serves as a character designer for the adaptation.)
- Produced by: Guillermo del Toro; Lisa Henson; Gary Ungar; Alex Bulkley; Corey Campodonico
- Starring: Ewan McGregor; David Bradley; Gregory Mann; Burn Gorman; Ron Perlman; John Turturro; Finn Wolfhard; Cate Blanchett; Tim Blake Nelson; Christoph Waltz; Tilda Swinton
- Cinematography: Frank Passingham
- Edited by: Ken Schretzmann; Holly Klein
- Music by: Alexandre Desplat
- Production companies: Netflix Animation Studios; Double Dare You!; ShadowMachine; The Jim Henson Company; Taller del Chucho
- Distributed by: Netflix
- Release dates: October 15, 2022 (BFI); November 9, 2022 (United States); December 9, 2022 (Netflix)
- Running time: 117 minutes
- Countries: United States; Mexico
- Language: English
- Budget: $35 million
- Box office: $109,846

Guillermo del Toro's Pinocchio (or simply Pinocchio) is a 2022 animated musical dark fantasy film directed by Guillermo del Toro and Mark Gustafson, from a screenplay by del Toro and Patrick McHale, and a story by del Toro and Matthew Robbins. It is loosely based on Carlo Collodi's 1883 Italian novel The Adventures of Pinocchio, with the title character's design strongly influenced by illustrator Gris Grimly's work. Set in Fascist Italy during the interwar period, the story follows Pinocchio, a wooden puppet who comes to life as the son of his carver, Geppetto. The film stars the voice of Gregory Mann as Pinocchio and David Bradley as Geppetto, alongside Ewan McGregor, Burn Gorman, Ron Perlman, John Turturro, Finn Wolfhard, Cate Blanchett, Tim Blake Nelson, Christoph Waltz, and Tilda Swinton. Pinocchio was the final film credited to Gustafson before his death in 2024.

A longtime passion project for del Toro, who considers that no other character ever "had as deep of a personal connection to [him]" as Pinocchio, the film is dedicated to the memories of his parents. It was originally announced in 2008 with a release in 2013 or 2014. However, it went into development hell. In January 2017, McHale was announced to co-write the screenplay, but production was suspended in November 2017 as no studios were willing to provide financing. It was revived the following year after being acquired by Netflix.

Pinocchio premiered at the BFI London Film Festival on October 15, 2022. It was released in select theaters on November 9, and began streaming on Netflix on December 9. The film received widespread critical acclaim for its direction, writing, voice performances, animation, production design, musical numbers, and faithfulness in retaining the darkness of the source material. Among its numerous accolades, Pinocchio won Best Animated Feature category at the Academy Awards, BAFTA Awards, Golden Globe Awards, Critic's Choice Awards and PGA Awards.

== Plot ==
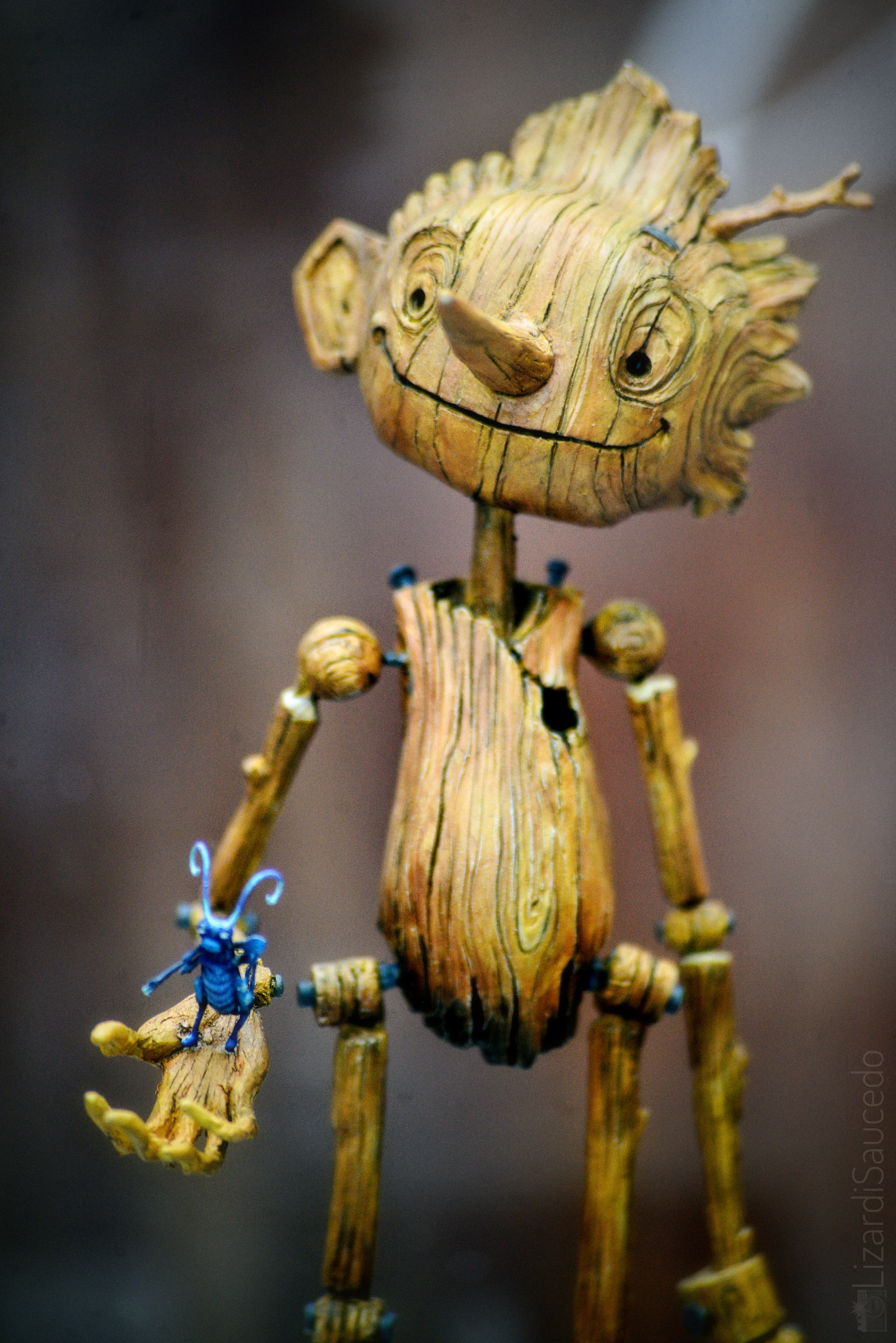
Resin sculpture of Pinocchio and Sebastian used in the film, exhibited at the Cineteca Nacional de México

In Italy, woodcarver Geppetto loses his son Carlo to an aerial bombardment by Austro-Hungarian forces during World War I. Twenty years later, he uses the pine wood planted in Carlo's grave to create a puppet in drunken despair. The Wood Sprite appears in the middle of the night and brings it to life, christening him Pinocchio due to the puppet being made of pine, and assigns Sebastian J. Cricket, who formerly lived inside the pine wood, to guide him morally, promising him a wish in exchange. Geppetto wakes up and is frightened by Pinocchio exploring and destroying his home. He becomes fed up with Pinocchio's antics due to his newborn lack of self-control, and he is told by the town that he must send the boy to school to teach him discipline. He gifts Pinocchio a schoolbook that used to belong to Carlo.

On his way, Pinocchio is intercepted by showman Count Volpe and his monkey Spazzatura, who bring Pinocchio to their circus to perform. Geppetto arrives to take him back, resulting in a confrontation that causes them to fight over him and ends with Pinocchio being fatally hit by the Podestà's truck. In the afterlife, he meets the Wood Sprite's sister, Death, who explains that he is immortal and revives when an hourglass empties, cautioning that each time he dies, he will spend longer in the afterlife before returning to life.

After Pinocchio comes back to life, an army officer hears about him and meets up with Geppetto. The officer tells Geppetto that Pinocchio may be a distraction by others and should be sent to military youth camp by law. Geppetto is conflicted over sending Pinocchio to youth camp or sending him to perform in the circus. Seeing Geppetto upset, Pinocchio decides to earn money for him by performing in the circus, and to avoid being conscripted into the Army by the Podestà, who thinks his immortality makes him the ideal soldier. A jealous Spazzatura, the former star, reveals to Pinocchio that Volpe has been lying to him about sending half their profits to Geppetto. Hearing this, Volpe viciously beats Spazzatura as a result, upsetting Pinocchio, who performs a song ridiculing Benito Mussolini while he is in attendance. Mussolini has Pinocchio executed and the circus burned down.

Once revived, Pinocchio is taken by the Podestà to military recruit training, where other boys are trained for war. He befriends the Podestà's mistreated son, Candlewick. At a training game, Pinocchio and Candlewick win in a tie; the Podestà orders Candlewick to shoot Pinocchio, but he refuses and finally stands up to his father. The training camp is then bombed by Allied aircraft, killing the Podestà, while the boys flee. Pinocchio is captured by Volpe, who tries to burn him to death as revenge for ruining his career. Spazzatura saves Pinocchio and attacks Volpe, resulting in all three falling off a seaside cliff, which kills Volpe.

Lost at sea, Pinocchio and Spazzatura are swallowed by the Terrible Dogfish. Inside its belly, Pinocchio and Spazzatura find Geppetto and Sebastian, who were also swallowed during their search for Pinocchio. Sebastian realizes they can escape the dogfish by climbing out of its blowhole. Pinocchio lies to make his nose grow into a large branch, forming a bridge leading out of the monster's blowhole. As the dogfish attempts to eat them again, Pinocchio sacrifices himself by detonating a naval mine inside the dogfish, killing them both. Upon meeting Death again, Pinocchio demands to be sent back early to save Geppetto from drowning. Aware that it will make him mortal, Pinocchio breaks the hourglass to return and dies saving his father. The Wood Sprite reappears to a mourning Geppetto and Sebastian, who uses his wish to make her revive Pinocchio.

Pinocchio, Geppetto, Sebastian, and Spazzatura return home to live together as a family. After outliving all of them, Pinocchio decides to travel the world and find his own place in life.

== Voice cast ==
- Gregory Mann as:
  - Pinocchio, an exuberant and rowdy living wooden puppet.
  - Carlo, Geppetto's deceased son who was killed in a bombing raid. He is named after Carlo Collodi, author of the original book. Alfie Tempest is also credited as portraying Carlo.
- Ewan McGregor as Sebastian J. Cricket, a traveling cricket and the narrator of the story, who lives inside Pinocchio as his guide and conscience.
- David Bradley as Geppetto, Pinocchio's father, a heartbroken Italian woodcarver grieving his deceased son Carlo.
- Christoph Waltz as Count Volpe, a conniving, evil and cruel former aristocrat-turned-puppet master, con artist, and ringmaster living in destitution. His name means "fox" in Italian and he is a composite character of the Fox, Mangiafuoco, and the Ringmaster from the original Pinocchio story.
- Tilda Swinton as:
  - The Wood Sprite (referred to as "The Blue Fairy" in the soundtrack), a wise magical spirit who gives Pinocchio life. Her appearance is a humanoid with two main pairs of wings that have eyes on them (as well as three additional smaller pairs of wings that covers her face and breast), a feathered snake-like tail, and a human-like face that resembles a mask; her appearance is reminiscent of the biblical angels called seraphim.
  - Death (referred to as "The Sphinx" in the soundtrack), the Wood Sprite's sister who oversees the afterlife. Her appearance is similar to that of a Chimera, with a human-like face that resembles a mask, the horns of a cape buffalo with eyes on them, the lower horns of a Jacob sheep, the body of a lion, the wings of an eagle with eyes on them, and a two-headed snake-like tail.
- Cate Blanchett as Spazzatura, Count Volpe's mistreated monkey assistant. His name means "trash" or "garbage" in Italian, and he is the film's counterpart of the Cat from the original Pinocchio story. Spazzatura can only speak through the puppets he operates.
- Ron Perlman as the Podestà, a strict fascist government official who wants to turn Pinocchio into a soldier after seeing his revival. He is the film's counterpart of the Coachman from the original story.
- Finn Wolfhard as Candlewick, the Podestà's son who bullies Pinocchio before befriending him.
- Burn Gorman as the Priest, a Roman Catholic priest at Geppetto's village who's also his former client.
- John Turturro as the Dottore, a doctor at Geppetto's village who examines Pinocchio after his first death.
- Tim Blake Nelson as the Black Rabbits, a flock of black rabbits with skeletal bodies who work for Death. They are based on the Undertaker Rabbits from the original story.
- Tom Kenny as:
  - Benito Mussolini, the leader of Fascist Italy.
  - Benito Mussolini's right-hand man
  - A sea captain with a hook for a hand and a peg leg who explains to Geppetto and Sebastian about the Dogfish.

== Production ==
=== Development ===
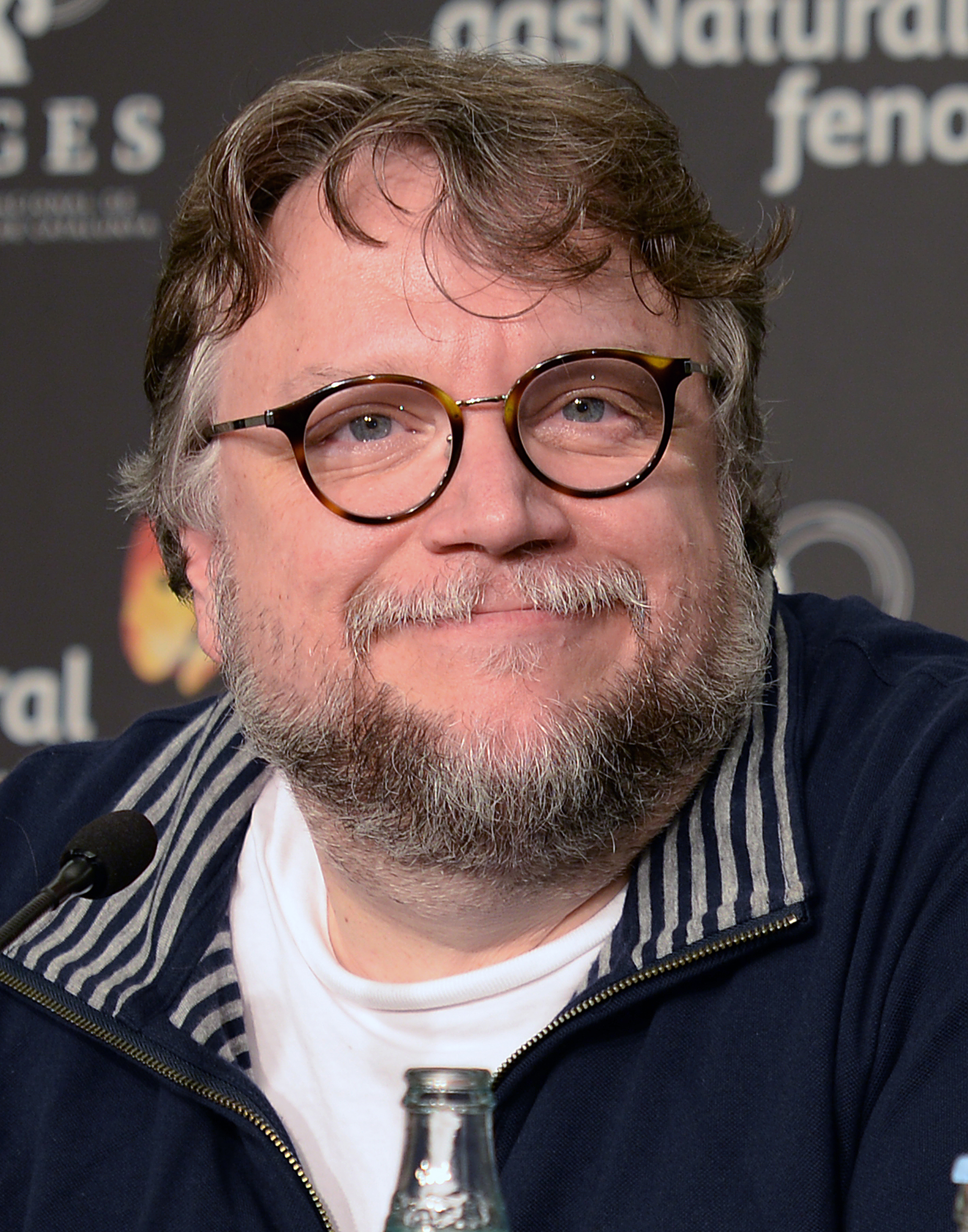
Guillermo del Toro conceived initial ideas for his own Pinocchio adaptation in 2003 and had been working on the film since 2008.

In 2008, Guillermo del Toro announced that his next project, a darker adaptation of the Italian novel The Adventures of Pinocchio (1883), was in development. He has called Pinocchio his "passion project", stating: "No art form has influenced my life and my work more than animation, and no single character in history has had as deep of a personal connection to me as Pinocchio", and "I've wanted to make this movie for as long as I can remember". When he was a child, del Toro saw and liked Walt Disney's 1940 animated film adaptation in Guadalajara, Mexico, partially because he felt it was like a "horror movie" in its own way due to a few intense moments it included. Since his teen years, he had longed to make his own version of the story. In 2003, del Toro discovered Gris Grimly's illustrations for the 2002 edition of Carlo Collodi's book, portraying Pinocchio as a puppet with a long, pointed nose and spindly limbs, with gestures that del Toro felt captured the energy of an unruly but otherwise goodhearted puppet. He concluded that Grimly's illustrations reflected the setting he had in mind for his own, more somber version of Collodi's tale. When del Toro asked Grimly why Pinocchio looked the way he did, Grimly said it was because Geppetto was drunk when he made him. This thought evolved into an important part of Geppetto's backstory.

On February 17, 2011, it was announced that Grimly and Mark Gustafson would co-direct a stop-motion animated Pinocchio film written by del Toro and his long-time collaborator Matthew Robbins, and that it would be visually based on Grimly's designs. Del Toro would produce the film along with The Jim Henson Company and Pathé. Grimly devised Pinocchio's look for the film, depicting him as unfinished wood. Though Grimly was initially set to direct the film and del Toro was set to produce it, on May 17, 2012, del Toro took over as director. He then teamed up with Gustafson, a stop-motion veteran who had experience in similar stop-motion features like Fantastic Mr. Fox (2009), to assist him in achieving his ambitious vision for the project. In February 2012, del Toro released some concept art of Pinocchio, Geppetto, the Talking Cricket, Mangiafuoco and the Fox and the Cat. On July 30, 2012, it was announced that the film would be produced and animated by ShadowMachine. It was originally scheduled to be released in 2013 or 2014, but went into development hell, with no further information forthcoming about it for years.

On January 23, 2017, Patrick McHale was announced to co-write the script with del Toro. On August 31, 2017, del Toro told IndieWire at the 74th Venice International Film Festival that the film would need a budget increase of $35 million or it would be cancelled. On November 8, 2017, he reported that the project was not happening because no studios were willing to finance it. At one point, Matthew Robbins considered making a 2D-animated version of the film with French artist Joann Sfar to bring the costs down, but del Toro decided that it had to be stop-motion, even if the higher budget made it harder to get it greenlit. On October 22, 2018, it was announced that the film had been revived, with Netflix acquiring it, and Pathé no longer involved.

Almost all the years of development were spent by del Toro and Gustafson defining the designs for the principal characters, basing them on either Grimly's designs or letting del Toro's frequent collaborator Guy Davis, who joined the project as co-production designer with art director Curt Enderle, to design them. They then gave the animation models to England's Mackinnon & Saunders stop-motion puppet firm, which is considered by del Toro to be the "best in the world", and they fabricated the designs of Pinocchio, Geppetto, Sebastian J. Cricket, Count Volpe, and Spazzatura the Monkey. Most of the key characters have mechanical heads to create facial expressions, but for Pinocchio, a metal 3-D printed puppet, 3000 replacement faces were used.

The antagonist Count Volpe is a combination of Mangiafuoco and the Fox from the original story. Mangiafuoco was originally supposed to appear in the movie as an antagonist, but he was removed halfway through production as del Toro disliked the character and thought he was a cliché; as a character model had already been made for Mangiafuoco, to not waste the model, Mangiafuoco's original design was used as a background character for Volpe's circus as a strongman. The Cat, who was shown in a concept art, was replaced by Spazzatura, while the Land of Toys was replaced with an Italian kids training camp. At first, the fairy with blue hair was a dead girl from the same cemetery where Carlo was buried. This was changed into two angel-like beings, which ended up as the two sisters of life and death, and Carlo was no longer buried in a cemetery; their design as supernatural winged beings with multiple eyes harkens back to the biblical seraphim as well as to the Angel of Death from Hellboy II: The Golden Army (2008).

=== Writing ===
To me, it's essential to counter the idea that you have to change into a flesh-and-blood child to be a real human. All you need to be human is to really behave like one, you know? I have never believed that transformation [should] be demanded to gain love.

— Guillermo del Toro's thoughts on the film's core idea

Guillermo del Toro was intrigued by similarities between Collodi's The Adventures of Pinocchio and Mary Shelley's novel Frankenstein; or, The Modern Prometheus (1818). Both tell of a childlike figure, brought to life and thrown into the world by a father figure who expects him to discover, on his own, the qualities that make us human, such as love and the capacity to distinguish between right and wrong. These themes reminded del Toro of his childhood. Frankenstein partly inspired del Toro to give his Pinocchio a gothic direction, but the film was still crafted to be family friendly. He sought to make connections across generations, and convey compassion, a value del Toro feels is essential for children faced with the tremendous complexity of today's world.

In del Toro's Pinocchio, the wood used to construct the puppet is carved from a tree that grows over the grave of Carlo, Geppetto's son. Pinocchio's arrival provides his grief-blinded father another opportunity for fatherhood. However, Pinocchio is rowdy, exuberant, and wild, in contrast to the well-behaved and docile Carlo. The characterization of Sebastian J. Cricket, the talking cricket, is also changed. Sebastian somewhat ponderously takes on the role of Pinocchio's conscience. His self-importance annoys Pinocchio, causing him to escape Sebastian's supervision. The cricket comes to see that Pinocchio must discover certain things for himself, such as love, humility, and how to behave. As in the original book, Sebastian is "killed" a number of times over the duration of the film, but always comes back in order to fulfill his character arc. Del Toro did not wish to overly rely upon magical creatures in the film. Desiring more realism, he reworked the Fox into a human, naming him Count Volpe and having him replace Mangiafuoco as an homage to and amalgamation of both characters. The Cat was omitted and the Land of Toys was transformed into an Italian children's training camp. In the donkey subplot, the Coachman is replaced by the Podestà, a fascist official who, realizing that Pinocchio cannot be killed, strives to recruit him into Italy's military. Candlewick is changed into a bully who eventually redeems himself.

Most versions of the story take place in a fairy tale environment. Del Toro's film resituates the story in Fascist Italy between World War I and World War II, during the rise of Benito Mussolini. Pinocchio thus awakens in a society of people who behave like obedient puppets. By contrast, Pinocchio is independent and irrepressible. He cannot bring himself to abide by the rules or submit to authority figures, even when he encounters Mussolini himself, and then the spirit of Death, in limbo. Gustafson was drawn to this characterization of Pinocchio, newly born, arriving in the world fresh and unaware of consequences. Over the course of the narrative, Pinocchio awakens to his latent humanity, and in the end chooses to become mortal in order to save the life of Geppetto. Del Toro chose to move away the original book's apparent agenda, which can be interpreted as a moral tale that seeks to repress the spirits of children, encouraging blind obedience to parents and other authority figures. Del Toro, however, saw the development of Pinocchio's autonomy as a virtue. Del Toro's film is oriented around self discovery and moral agency. Del Toro's sought to explore aspects of father-son relationships, such as Geppetto's initial inability to accept Pinocchio as his own being, more than just Carlo's replacement. Geppetto struggles with guilt about the disruptiveness of the "freakish monster" that the town rejects initially. Some themes of this work may seen in previous works such as The Devil's Backbone (2001), Pan's Labyrinth (2006) and The Shape of Water (2017). These three films also explore the humanity of those, like Pinocchio, who are perceived as different.

Most previous renditions of this story feature the necessity of physical transmutation from wooden puppet to flesh and blood. Del Toro explicitly rejects this concept, that Pinocchio must physically change in order to be loved by his father and find happiness. The film asserts that the essence of humanity lies in the feelings of interiority and the expressions of exteriority, especially as behavior. Pinocchio is therefore unconcerned with whether or not he turns into a "real boy". The basis of the transformation is instead Geppetto's journey to accepting and loving Pinocchio for who he is. In the end, he loves him as fiercely as he did Carlo. This reminded del Toro of his relationship with his father Federico.

=== Casting ===
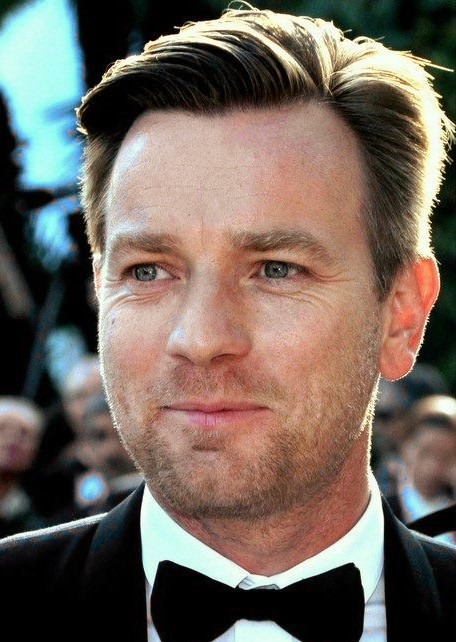
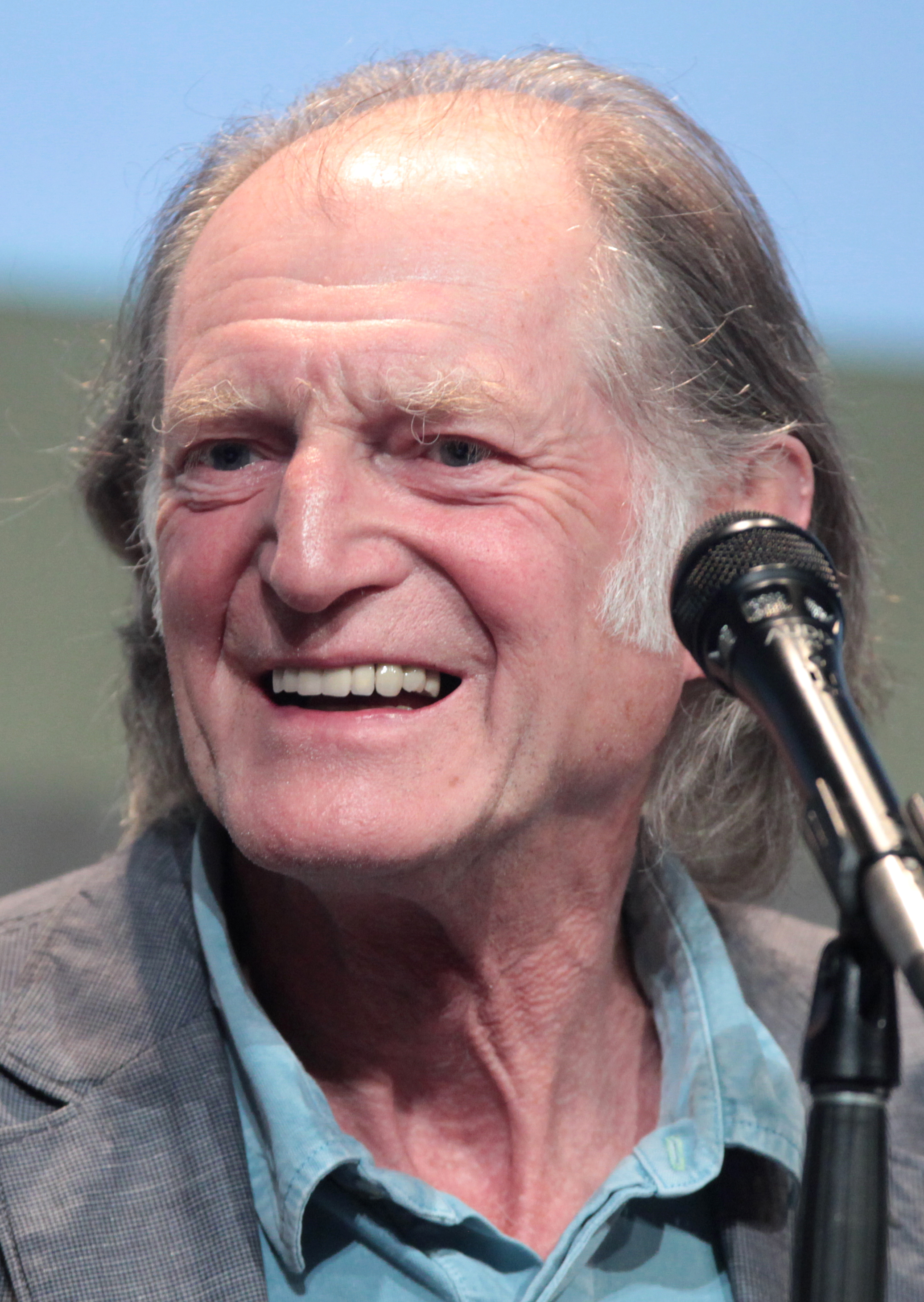
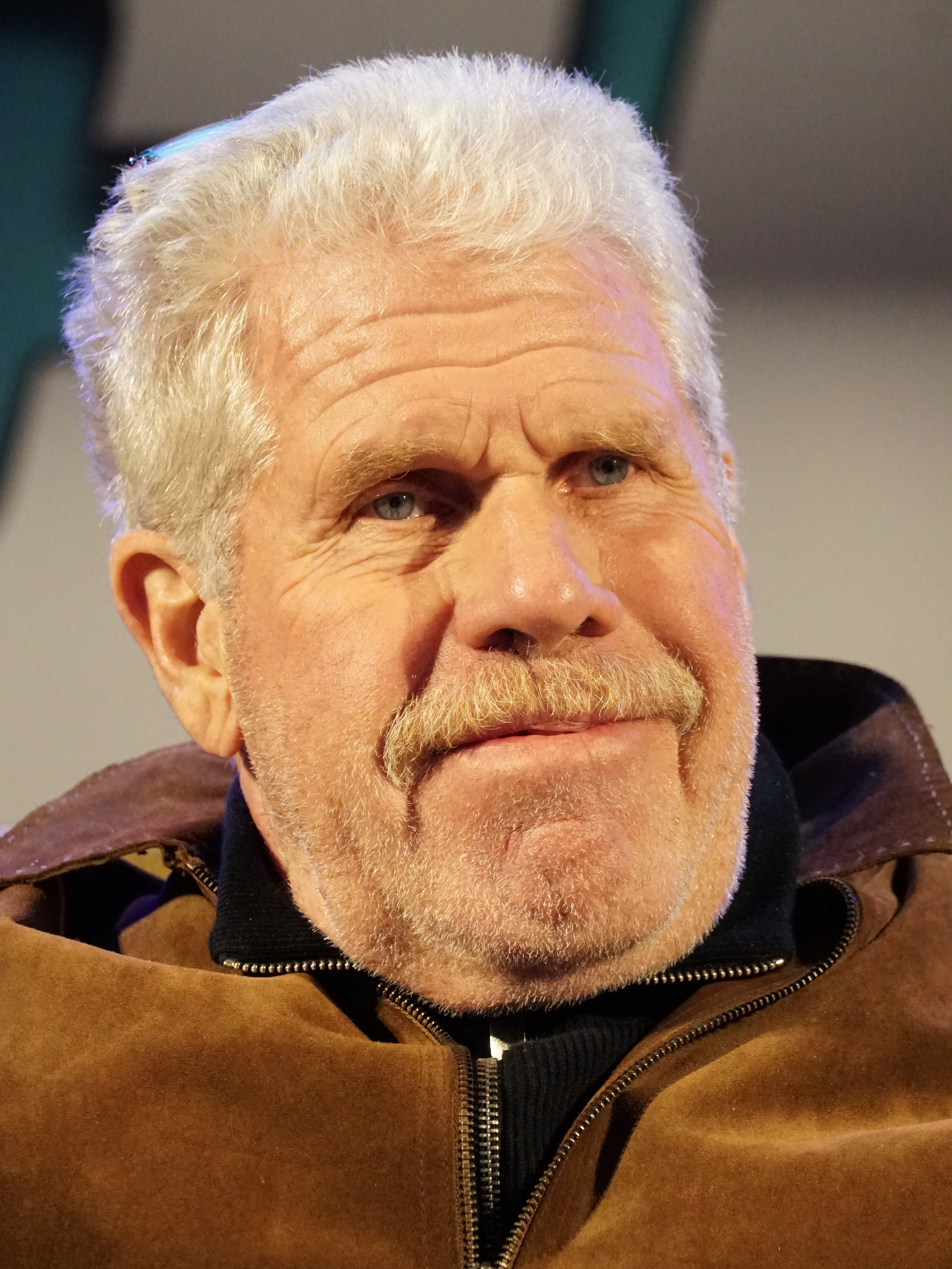
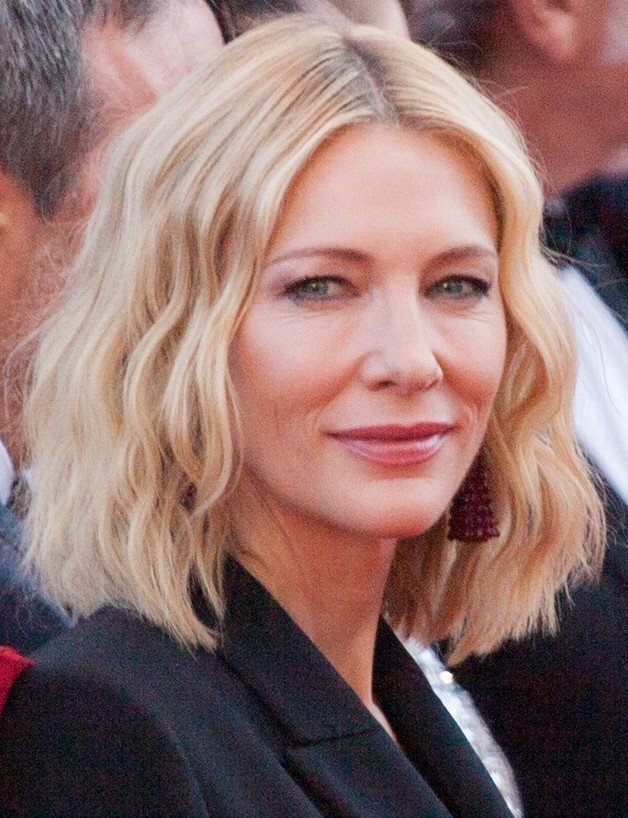
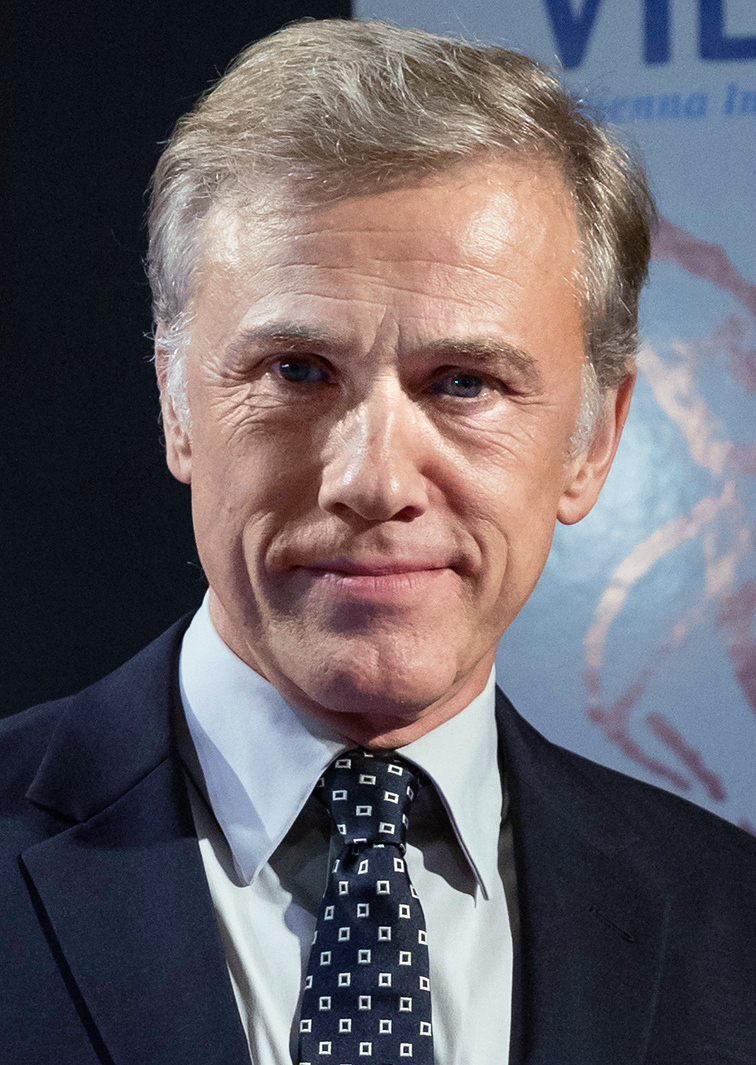
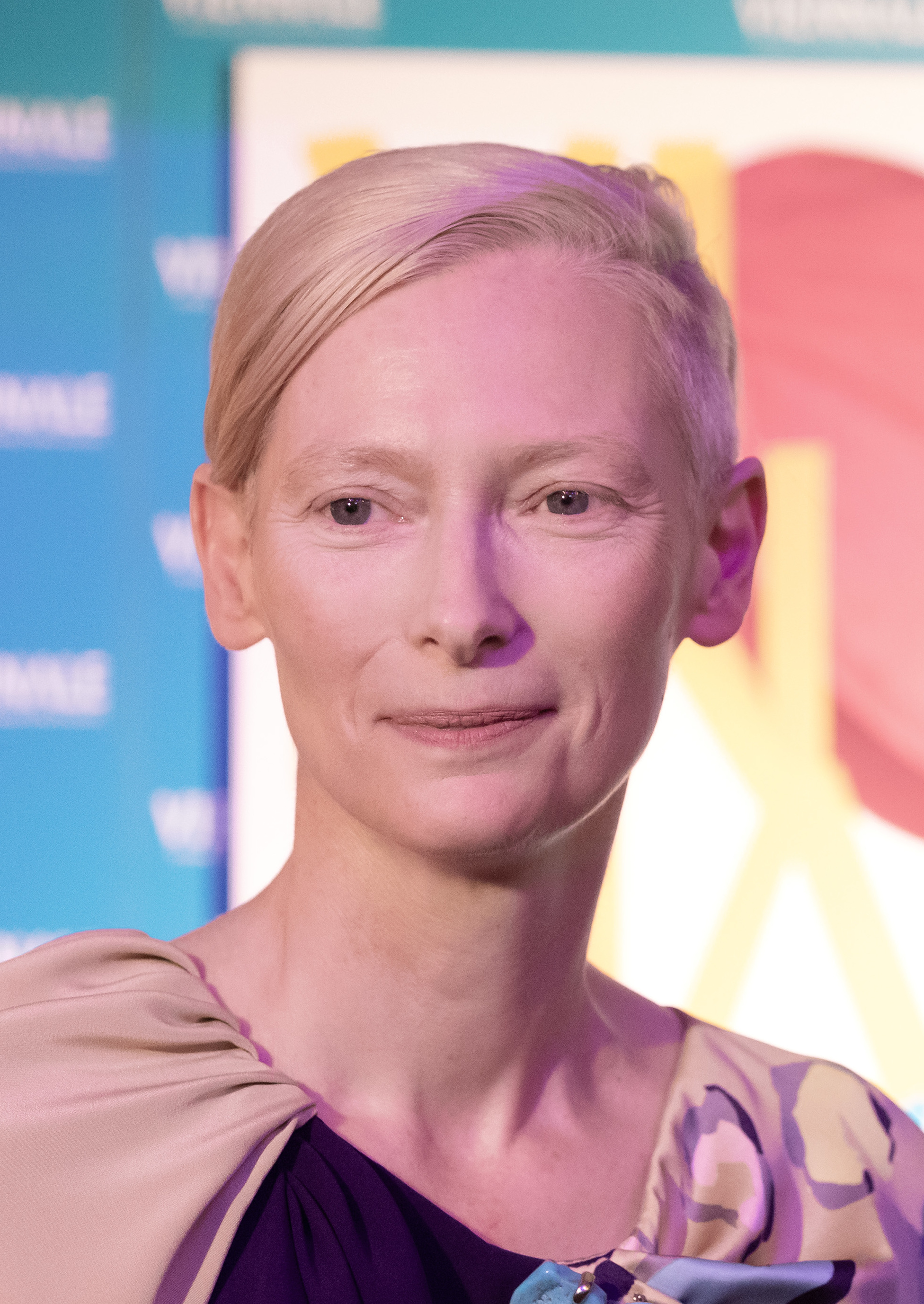
Several of the actors, such as Ewan McGregor, David Bradley, Ron Perlman, Cate Blanchett, Christoph Waltz and Tilda Swinton, were cast in diverse roles, either as characters from the original story such as the Talking Cricket and Geppetto or new characters such as the Podestà, Spazzatura and Count Volpe.

In assembling the film's voice cast, del Toro and Gustafson selected multiple Academy Award winners and gifted performers with past creative ties with the former. Daniel Radcliffe, Tom Waits and Christopher Walken were originally considered to star in the film. Waits was reportedly considered to voice Geppetto and del Toro was reported by /Film to be floating up casting Walken as the Fox, though he was also considering Donald Sutherland for that part. Radcliffe would later instead remain as executive producer of the film. Early on during the film's development, del Toro first approached John Hurt, with whom he had worked on Hellboy (2004) and Hellboy II: The Golden Army, to voice Geppetto, but Hurt eventually died in 2017 long before any recordings for the film could begin.

On January 31, 2020, it was announced Ron Perlman, Tilda Swinton, Ewan McGregor, Christoph Waltz and David Bradley had joined the cast of the film. Bradley was chiefly cast due to his previous collaborations with del Toro on the television series The Strain and Trollhunters: Tales of Arcadia. He considered his role as Geppetto to be a "real emotion rollercoaster" of a part, feeling it to resemble more King Lear than the Pinocchio story he had heard as a child. Perlman was originally cast to voice Mangiafuoco, but once del Toro decided to remove the character in favor of Count Volpe, Perlman was recast as the Podestà while Waltz was cast as Volpe, who del Toro regards as the film's closest character to the Devil, a more over-the-top character than the Fox and the Cat and a comically evil man who seems like taken out from the cartoonish and fantastical tone of the original book.

On August 19, 2020, Gregory Mann, Cate Blanchett, Tim Blake Nelson, Finn Wolfhard, John Turturro and Burn Gorman were added to the cast. For Pinocchio, del Toro sought a child actor who sounded like an ordinary boy instead of a cute one, which led him to cast Mann for his phenomenal vocal range that made him sound like a natural child, yet one absolutely emotional. Mann's vocal performance provided a "silly and sunny" personality for the titular character who longs to learn about the world and meet everyone, but given how he was created with the wood of the tree next to Carlo's grave, his roots are somewhat sad. Wolfhard, who is not particularly fond of voice acting due to feeling himself not as proficient as professional voice actors, was nevertheless relaxed enough to record some of his lines as Candlewick together with Mann, as he felt that he performs voice-over better with people around instead of alone in a recording booth, crediting del Toro and Gustafson for allowing him that. Blanchett approached del Toro about joining the film as they worked together on Nightmare Alley (2021); he told her that all roles had already been cast minus that of Spazzatura the Monkey, which Blanchett gladly accepted as long as she could work with del Toro again. She also suggested that the monkey was her spirit animal as del Toro prepared to commence production of Pinocchio to ensure her casting. Blanchett recorded her voice-over shot-by-shot instead of making different emotion sounds to be edited later on like it is usually done in other productions.

=== Filming ===
Filming commenced at the Portland, Oregon offices of ShadowMachine by January 31, 2020. Production continued through early summer 2022, with some select sequences being handled by del Toro's own Centro Internacional de Animación (CIA) local studio, settled on Guadalajara, Mexico since 2019 to foster local talent from Mexico. All sets, props and character costumes were crafted to the same historical and realistic standards del Toro's live-action work has often contained, hence the production's decision to not overly stylize buildings through methods like stylizing them in a curvy, stretched and leaning way, leading to a mix of stop-motion and live-action styles that support the film's themes. Animators were also encouraged to achieve naturalistic performances from the puppets by making them "commit mistakes" like itching, sneezing or looking away if embarrassed or scared in order to shoot the characters thinking and listening, traits not usually shot in animation. For Count Volpe's carnival, Davis and Enderle drew from the reference material library collected for del Toro's previous film Nightmare Alley, which prominently starred a 1930s carnival and in which Davis had previously worked as a concept artist, even though that film's carnival was one settled in the American Midwest rather than in Europe, so despite the great overlap between American and European carnivals, the filmmakers developed looks for both carnivals that were similarly downtrodden and threadbare. Some Nightmare Alley early shots featuring Bradley Cooper's Stanton Carlisle arriving at the carnival inspired the sequence that establishes Volpe's carnival. The afterlife sequences and the end credits scene were animated by studio El Taller de Chucho in Guadalajara, Mexico.

=== Visual effects ===
The film's production quality was formed through the ornate detail of the sets and characters with their own textures in order to reinterpret Collodi's work in a way that differed from the Disney animated version. Del Toro told Vanity Fair: "I have been very vocal about my admiration and my great, great love for Disney all my life, but that is an impulse that actually makes me move away from that version. I think it is a pinnacle of Disney animation. It's done in the most beautiful, hand-drawn 2D animation". He saw as "beautiful" the idea of using puppets to create a movie about a puppet, while pushing the boundaries of stop-motion as much as possible to create a "heartfelt" movie any audience could watch. Moving Picture Company worked on the visual effects, with Bot VFX and Mist VFX. Digital effects, like rain, snow, fire, explosions and water, were made to look like practical effects instead of real, to make them fit with the rest of the stop motion-world. The shelves with hourglasses that is seen in the background when Pinocchio meets Death, were meant to be physical models made of acrylic. But because of COVID, there was a shortage of acrylic materials, and so it had to be done digitally instead.

=== Music ===
On January 8, 2020, Alexandre Desplat started composing the film's score and original songs. It is Desplat's and del Toro's second collaboration, after The Shape of Water. Roeban Katz was the lyricist. On August 23, 2012, Nick Cave was attached to compose the score, but he was replaced by Desplat eight years later.

== Release ==
In November 2018, Netflix set the film's release date for 2021. In January 2021, Netflix CEO Ted Sarandos revealed that the release could be moved to 2022 or later, with Netflix's notion of releasing six animated films a year. In December 2021, del Toro stated it will be released in the last quarter of 2022. In January and July 2022, with the release of the film's first teaser, it was announced for a December release. Over its first seven days of digital release, the film logged over 10.91 million hours viewed worldwide.

Pinocchio had its world premiere at the 66th BFI London Film Festival on October 15, 2022. It debuted in the United States at the 2022 AFI Fest on November 5, 2022. It was released in select cinemas on November 9, 2022, and began streaming on Netflix on December 9, 2022. One of the theatres scheduled to show the film on November 11, 2022, was the TIFF Bell Lightbox in Toronto, Ontario.

In Mexico, the director's country, the Cinemex movie theater chain – one of the largest exhibitors – suspended the screenings that were scheduled, causing protests by del Toro, who wanted most of the people in his country to see the film. In response, on November 25, the filmmaker made a call on his Twitter account to show the film in independent theaters throughout the country. Some thirty independent theaters and clubs joined the call to show the film, including the country's Cineteca Nacional, where an exhibition of the figures used in the film was also set up in its central courtyard. On December 18, it was announced that, on December 30, a massive screening would be held in Mexico City's main square, the Zócalo. The event was attended by 1,400 people.

From December 4, 2022, through January 4, 2023, the film played at the Museum of Modern Art in New York City in the Debra and Leon Black Family Film Center. This coincided with a multi-floor exhibition at the MoMa called "Guillermo Del Toro: Crafting Pinocchio", which ran through April 15, 2023 and showcased various aspects of the film's inspiration and production.

The Criterion Collection released the film on Ultra HD Blu-ray, Blu-ray, and DVD on December 12, 2023.

== Reception ==
=== Critical response ===
On the review aggregator website Rotten Tomatoes, 96% of 290 critics' reviews are positive, with an average rating of 8.3/10. The website's consensus reads: "Guillermo del Toro's Pinocchio delivers fully on its title – which is to say it's a visually stunning adaptation that embraces its source material's darkness." Metacritic, which uses a weighted average, assigned the film a score of 79 out of 100, based on 49 critics, indicating "generally favorable" reviews.

The Hindu's Gautam Sunder wrote, "Having more in common with del Toro's own Pan's Labyrinth than any Pinocchio adaptation before this, the modern-day Mexican auteur reimagines the children's tale into something much more sinister, serious and politically inclined." The BBC's Caryn James said, "You've probably never seen a Pinocchio who dances for Mussolini, but Guillermo del Toro's dark, stirring, yet life-affirming take on the classic tale of the puppet who becomes a real boy has more in common with Pan's Labyrinth and The Shape of Water... than with the familiar Disney version." Peter Bradshaw of The Guardian gave the film 3/5 stars, saying it "certainly has its moments of poignancy and sadness and McGregor's droll tones as the longsuffering cricket provide some grace notes of fun."

Brian Lowry of CNN was more critical, writing, "beyond answering the streaming giant's wish for another marquee attraction carved from a beloved property, any praise comes with a few strings attached, depriving it of the consistent sense of wonder that would qualify as a dream come true." The New York Times's Manohla Dargis wrote, "As weird as the story is, it's been made all the stranger by the decision to turn it into a metaphor about fascism, a conceit that is as politically incoherent as it is unfortunately timed."

In December 2024, Collider ranked the film at number 5 on its list of the "10 Best Fantasy Movies of the 2020s," with Robert Lee III calling it "a story all its own while still adhering to the same magic and strengths of the original novel, creating what can easily be considered one of the best adaptations of the fairy tale. The stop-motion animation is a breathtaking sight to behold, with exceptional character design and charm exuding from each setting and facial expression."

=== Accolades ===
Pinocchio was the first animated film from a streaming service to win the Academy Award for Best Animated Feature. The animation studio Netflix Animation previously competed with three previous nominations for the same category. It was the seventh non-Disney/Pixar film to win and the first non-Disney/Pixar film since Spider-Man: Into the Spider-Verse, the second stop-motion animated film after Aardman's Wallace & Gromit: The Curse of the Were-Rabbit, and The Adventures of Pinocchio's second adaptation to win any category from the Academy Awards after Disney's animated Pinocchio.
