= The Social Reckoning (soundtrack) =

2026 film soundtrack album

The Social Reckoning (Original Motion Picture Soundtrack)

Film score by Alexandre Desplat
- Released: October 9, 2026
- Studios: John Williams Scoring Stage, Sony Pictures Studios, Culver City, California
- Genre: Film score
- Length: 45:49
- Label: Sony Classical
- Producer: Alexandre Desplat

Alexandre Desplat chronology
Frankenstein (2025)	The Social Reckoning (2026)

The Social Reckoning (Original Motion Picture Soundtrack) is the film score to the 2026 The Social Reckoning directed by Aaron Sorkin which served as the follow-up to The Social Network (2010), starring Mikey Madison, Jeremy Allen White, Jeremy Strong, Bill Burr, Wunmi Mosaku, Betty Gilpin, and Billy Magnussen. The film score is composed by Alexandre Desplat and released through Sony Classical Records on October 9, 2026.

== Development ==
By March 2026, Alexandre Desplat was announced to score music for The Social Reckoning, replacing Trent Reznor and Atticus Ross who composed the Academy Award-winning score for The Social Network. Desplat also replaced Daniel Pemberton, who had collaborated with Sorkin on his previous works. Regarding his involvement, Sorkin wanted the score to be "symphonic" and reminiscent of moments that felt like a Hollywood film.

Desplat noted that when he read Sorkin's script, he was "taken aback by the sophistication of his writing" adding that the dialogues were integral to the film, and language being more important to the score than other music he had written. Sorkin considered that since the film was not a sequel, though Facebook being the centre of the story, he was instructed to not mention and quote Reznor and Ross' score, prompting him to approach with a fresh perspective.

One of the major challenges were finding the rhythm between the voices and performances, and to find the right moment for music to join the actors in the scene. Desplat's score explores the competing forces that drive the film's narrative: courage and uncertainty, conviction and doubt, personal sacrifice and public responsibility. The central point of the score is mostly a musical portrait of Frances Haugen and her journey from an employee to whistleblower formed the emotional core and that served as a character study before her ultimate act on her conscience.

Desplat completed the score prior to the summer of 2026. It was recorded at the John Williams Scoring Stage and Sony Picture Studios, and utilized a rich symphonic palette which seamlessly moved between character moments and dramatic sequences.

== Reception ==
James Southall of Movie Wave wrote "The Social Reckoning is a decent little score – there are good ideas in it and I admire its architecture – I doubt it's one that I will return to as often as this composer's best, but there's always something of interest happening in it." Guy Lodge of Variety wrote "Alexandre Desplat's score [...] toggles awkwardly between a pale imitation of Trent Reznor and Atticus Ross' melancholic lo-fi electronica in the previous film, and the ennobling orchestral themes that mark the filmmaker's happier place." Hannah Strong of Little White Lies wrote "Alexandre Desplat's score [is] trying very hard to not rip off Reznor and Ross".

Nikki Baughan of Screen International wrote "Alexandre Desplat's soaring, achingly traditional score [is] a world away from the edgy punk of Trent Reznor and Atticus Ross's Social Network." Amy Nicholson of Los Angeles Times stated that Desplat "scores to an overbearing military dirge". David Rooney of The Hollywood Reporter wrote that "Alexandre Desplat's elegant score feed[s] the tension without working too hard at it." Jim Vejvoda of IGN called it "melodramatic score".

Chris Evangelista of /Film wrote "Alexandre Desplat's underwhelming, barely-there score certainly doesn't help matters, and while I said at the top that I didn't want to spend too much time comparing The Social Reckoning to The Social Network, having Desplat's forgettable music take the place of Reznor and Ross' electric score from the previous film feels particularly egregious. Maybe if Reznor and Ross had returned the film would have some much-needed energy." Barry Hertz of The Globe and Mail wrote "composer Alexandre Desplat's score fully tips over into self-parody, a dispiriting follow-up to Trent Reznor and Atticus Ross's piercing work on Fincher's film".

== Track listing ==
No.	Title	Length
1.	"The Social Reckoning"	3:17
2.	"Tomorrow's Headlines"	1:40
3.	"F***"	4:04
4.	"Jeff"	1:02
5.	"Online"	1:03
6.	"Unplug"	3:55
7.	"MSI"	2:12
8.	"Celiac"	1:43
9.	"Published"	2:19
10.	"Frances Goes Home"	2:23
11.	"Psych Damage"	2:00
12.	"Likes"	2:07
13.	"Sleepless"	1:56
14.	"Chaos"	3:56
15.	"Waiting Room"	4:31
16.	"The Lament" (Alexandre Desplat & Renee Fleming)	3:46
17.	"72 Hours"	3:55
Total length:		45:49
