= Gris Grimly =

American illustrator and author

- Born: Nebraska, United States
- Occupations: Illustrator, author

Steven Soenksen, better known under his pen name Gris Grimly, is an American illustrator and author who mostly writes darkly whimsical children's books. Originally from Nebraska, he spent many years living and working in the Los Angeles area.

== Biography ==
Born in Nebraska, Grimly was drawn to the exciting and scary world of monsters and goblins. He was heavily inspired by classic horror films, comics, fine art, and writers such as Edgar Allan Poe, Edward Gorey, and H. P. Lovecraft. Grimly credits Jon J Muth as the sole reason he took up watercolor. "When I was young, I saw a copy of Moonshadow and wanted to do art like that. My work looks nothing like it, but that is why I went in that direction." After graduating from Concordia University Nebraska, where he studied art under Reinhold Marxhausen, Grimly moved to Los Angeles to broaden his experiences and opportunities. A couple of major studios had hired him to do concept work, and during his spare time he created a series of original miniature books which had the look and appeal of children's books, but the dark and twisted style only he could create. Although his intent was to work in the comic industry, this series of books landed him his first job illustrating children's books. Monster Museum and the ones that followed, defined a different style of children's books illustration which is entertaining enough for children to desire to read, yet adult enough for parents to enjoy as well. The success of these books garnered Grimly respect within the industry and led to his illustrations being seen in over a dozen books in only eight years. His ability has been used to recreate classics such as Edgar Allan Poe, Pinocchio, and The Legend of Sleepy Hollow, as well as to invent characters in his Wicked Nursery Rhymes trilogy and Little Jordan Ray's Muddy Spud.

In 2005, he wrote, directed, and produced his first short film, Cannibal Flesh Riot! This film started as a joint endeavor by Grimly and Peter Sandorff, guitarist for Nekromantix, Schwartzwald Library, and Mad Sin. Originally intended to be a comic which would have a score to accompany it, the story turned into a 35-minute short film consisting mostly of live action with segments of stop motion animation. Also, Sandorff created a band, Hola Ghost, in order to score the film and write its title track. The film was released and received high praise at film festivals and conventions worldwide.

In the summer of 2008, Grimly produced and directed a music video for the Texas-based band Ghoultown. This video, although produced on a shoestring budget, was filmed partially at the legendary Magic Castle in Hollywood, and it starred Cassandra Peterson as her cult persona, Elvira.

In May 2012, Grimly held the Baby Tattoo Books reading of the Spectrum Fantastic Art in Kansas City. Later that month, it was announced that Guillermo del Toro and Mark Gustafson would co-direct a stop-motion animated adaptation of Grimly's Pinocchio, with Grimly serving as an executive producer.

In 2013, HarperCollins released Grimly's graphic adaptation of Mary Shelley's Frankenstein. On NPR, in October 2013, Grimly discussed his personal connection with characters in the story, particularly Frankenstein's monster. In the interview he revealed that, at the age of five, he was seriously burned on his back and 80 percent of his skin. He recounted that he "grew up feeling kind of like a monster" and that attracted him to the Frankenstein story.

After years in development hell, Pinocchio premiered on October 15, 2022, at the 2022 BFI London Film Festival, before being released by Netflix on December 9, 2022. The film won the Oscar, Annie, BAFTA, Critics' Choice, Golden Globe, and PGA awards for Best Animated Feature, among numerous other accolades.

== Books ==
As author and illustrator

- Where Madness Reigns: The Art of Gris Grimly (Baby Tattoo, 2009)
- Gris Grimly's Wicked Nursery Rhymes trilogy (Baby Tattoo)
  - Wicked Nursery Rhymes III (2017)
  - Wicked Nursery Rhymes II (2006)
  - Wicked Nursery Rhymes (2003)
- Little Jordan Ray's Muddy Spud (Baby Tattoo, 2005)

As illustrator only

- Hocus Pocus by A.W. Jantha (Disney Press, 2022)
- Tales from the Brothers Grimm by the Brothers Grimm (Balzer + Bray, 2016)
- The Halloween Tree by Ray Bradbury (Knopf Books for Young Readers, 2015)
- Guys Read: Terrifying Tales (Walden Pond Press, 2015)
- A Study in Scarlet by Arthur Conan Doyle (Balzer + Bray, 2015)
- Frankenstein by Mary Shelley (Balzer + Bray, 2011)
- The Death of Yorik Mortwell by Stephen Messer (Random House, 2011)
- Edgar Allan Poe's Tales of Death and Dementia (Simon & Schuster, 2009)
- Sipping Spiders Through a Straw: Campfire Songs for Monsters by Kelly Dipucchio (Scholastic Press, 2008)
- The Dangerous Alphabet by Neil Gaiman (HarperCollins, 2008)
- The Legend of Sleepy Hollow by Washington Irving (Simon & Schuster, 2007)
- Santa Claws by Laura Leuck (Chronicle, 2006)
- Grimericks by Susan Pearson (Marshall Cavendish, 2005)
- Boris and Bella by Carolyn Crimi (Harcourt, 2004)
- Edgar Allan Poe's Tales of Mystery and Madness (Simon & Schuster, 2004)
- Creature Carnival by Marilyn Singer (Hyperion, 2004)
- Pinocchio by Carlo Collodi (Tor Books, 2002)
- The Cockatrice Boys by Joan Aiken (Tor Books, 2002)
- Monster Museum by Marilyn Singer (Hyperion Press, 2001)

== Filmography ==
- Cannibal Flesh Riot! (2006)
- The Craving (2007)
- Zeppo: El Exorcismo (2008)
- Wounded Embark of the Lovesick Mind (2009)
- Guillermo del Toro's Pinocchio (2022)

== Videography ==
- "Cannibal Flesh Riot!" performed by Hola Ghost (2006)
- "Mistress of the Dark" performed by Ghoultown (2008)

== See also ==
- Tim Burton
- Charles Addams
- Edward Gorey
- Ronald Searle
