= List of accolades received by Guillermo del Toro's Pinocchio =

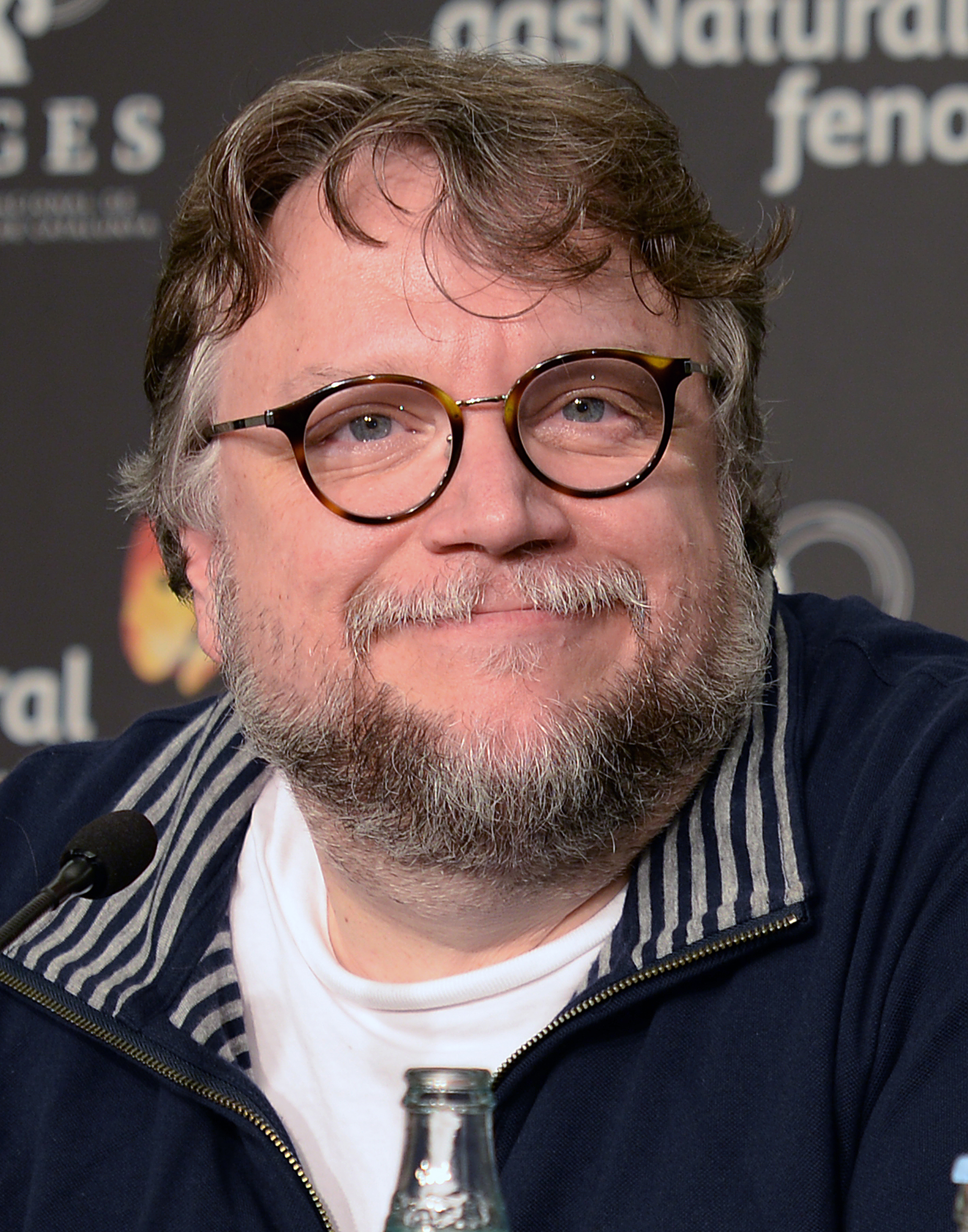
- Guillermo del Toro received acclaim for his screenplay, direction and animation
Accolades
Award	Wins	Nominations
Academy Awards	1	1
Alliance of Women Film Journalists	1	1
American Cinema Editors Awards	1	1
Annie Awards	5	9
Art Directors Guild Awards	1	1
Austin Film Critics Association	0	3
British Academy Film Awards	1	3
Chicago Film Critics Association Awards	1	3
Cinema Audio Society Awards	1	1
Critics' Choice Movie Awards	1	3
Dallas–Fort Worth Film Critics Association	2	3
Florida Film Critics Circle	0	2
Georgia Film Critics Association	1	4
Golden Globe Awards	1	3
Golden Reel Awards	1	2
Hollywood Critics Association Awards	1	3
Hollywood Critics Association Creative Arts Awards	0	2
Hollywood Music in Media Awards	2	3
Houston Film Critics Society	2	4
International Film Music Critics Association Awards	1	1
Los Angeles Film Critics Association Awards	1	1
Minnesota Film Critics Alliance	0	1
Online Film Critics Society	1	2
Producers Guild of America Awards	1	1
San Diego Film Critics Society	1	3
San Francisco Bay Area Film Critics Circle	1	2
Satellite Awards	0	1
Seattle Film Critics Society	0	1
St. Louis Film Critics Association Awards	0	2
Toronto Film Critics Association	0	1
USC Scripter Awards	0	1
Utah Film Critics Association	0	1
Visual Effects Society Awards	3	5
Washington D.C. Area Film Critics Association Awards	1	5

Totals (Note: Certain award groups do not simply award one winner. They acknowledge several different recipients, have runners-up, and have third place. Since this is a specific recognition and is different from losing an award, runner-up mentions are considered wins in this award tally. For simplification and to avoid errors, each award in this list has been presumed to have had a prior nomination.)
- Wins: 35
- Nominations: 80

Guillermo del Toro's Pinocchio (or simply Pinocchio) is a 2022 stop-motion animated musical dark fantasy film directed by Guillermo del Toro and Mark Gustafson, with a screenplay by del Toro and Patrick McHale. The story was written by Matthew Robbins and del Toro, who modified the script drawing from the 1883 Italian novel The Adventures of Pinocchio by Carlo Collodi, and also influenced Gris Grimly's illustrations for a 2002 edition of the book. As per the novel, the film reimagines the adventures of Pinocchio, a wooden puppet who comes to life as the son of his carver Geppetto. The film stars the voices of Gregory Mann as Pinocchio and David Bradley as Geppetto, alongside Ewan McGregor, Burn Gorman, Ron Perlman, John Turturro, Finn Wolfhard, Cate Blanchett, Tim Blake Nelson, Christoph Waltz, and Tilda Swinton.

Pinocchio premiered at the BFI London Film Festival on October 15, 2022. It was released in select theaters on November 9, 2022, and began streaming on Netflix on December 9. The film received critical acclaim for its animation, visuals, music, story, emotional weight and voice acting. Rotten Tomatoes, a review aggregator, surveyed 274 reviews and judged 97% to be positive.

The film received several awards and nominations, including the Academy Award for Best Animated Feature, thus becoming the first animated film from a streaming service, the first non-Disney/Pixar film since Spider-Man: Into the Spider-Verse (2018), the second stop-motion animated film after Aardman's Wallace & Gromit: The Curse of the Were-Rabbit (2005) and the Adventures of Pinocchio's second adaptation to win any category from Academy Awards after Disney's Pinocchio. It received three nominations at the 80th Golden Globe Awards and 76th British Academy Film Awards, winning Best Animated Feature Film and Best Animated Film, respectively, and nine Annie Award nominations, winning five, including Best Animated Feature.

== Accolades ==
Award	Date of ceremony	Category	Recipient(s)	Result	Ref.
Hollywood Music in Media Awards	November 16, 2022	Best Original Score in an Animated Film	Alexandre Desplat	Won	
Hollywood Music in Media Awards	November 16, 2022	Best Original Song in an Animated Film	Alexandre Desplat, Roeben Katz, and Guillermo del Toro ("Ciao Papa")	Won	
Hollywood Music in Media Awards	November 16, 2022	Music Themed Film, Biopic or Musical	Pinocchio	Nominated	
Los Angeles Film Critics Association Awards	December 11, 2022	Best Animated Film	Pinocchio	Won	
Washington D.C. Area Film Critics Association Awards	December 12, 2022	Best Animated Feature	Pinocchio	Won	
Washington D.C. Area Film Critics Association Awards	December 12, 2022	Best Adapted Screenplay	Patrick McHale and Guillermo del Toro	Nominated	
Washington D.C. Area Film Critics Association Awards	December 12, 2022	Best Original Score	Alexandre Desplat	Nominated	
Washington D.C. Area Film Critics Association Awards	December 12, 2022	Best Voice Performance	Gregory Mann	Nominated	
Washington D.C. Area Film Critics Association Awards	December 12, 2022	Best Voice Performance	Ewan McGregor	Nominated	
Chicago Film Critics Association Awards	December 14, 2022	Best Adapted Screenplay	Guillermo del Toro and Patrick McHale	Nominated	
Chicago Film Critics Association Awards	December 14, 2022	Best Animated Film	Pinocchio	Won	
Chicago Film Critics Association Awards	December 14, 2022	Best Original Score	Alexandre Desplat	Nominated	
Utah Film Critics Association	December 17, 2022	Best Animated Feature	Pinocchio	Runner-up	
St. Louis Film Critics Association Awards	December 18, 2022	Best Adapted Screenplay	Patrick McHale, Guillermo del Toro and Matthew Robbins	Nominated	
St. Louis Film Critics Association Awards	December 18, 2022	Best Animated Feature	Pinocchio	Nominated	
Dallas–Fort Worth Film Critics Association	December 19, 2022	Best Picture	Pinocchio	8th place	
Dallas–Fort Worth Film Critics Association	December 19, 2022	Best Animated Film	Pinocchio	Won	
Dallas–Fort Worth Film Critics Association	December 19, 2022	Best Musical Score	Alexandre Desplat	Won	
Florida Film Critics Circle	December 22, 2022	Best Animated Film	Pinocchio	Nominated	
Florida Film Critics Circle	December 22, 2022	Best Adapted Screenplay	Guillermo del Toro, Matthew Robbins, Gris Grimly, Patrick McHale	Nominated	
Alliance of Women Film Journalists	January 5, 2023	Best Animated Film	Pinocchio	Won	
San Diego Film Critics Society	January 6, 2023	Best Adapted Screenplay	Guillermo del Toro, Matthew Robbins, Gris Grimly, Patrick McHale	Runner-up	
San Diego Film Critics Society	January 6, 2023	Best Animated Film	Pinocchio	Won	
San Diego Film Critics Society	January 6, 2023	Best Visual Effects	Pinocchio	Nominated	
Toronto Film Critics Association	January 8, 2023	Best Animated Film	Pinocchio	Runner-up	
San Francisco Bay Area Film Critics Circle	January 9, 2023	Best Animated Feature	Pinocchio	Won	
San Francisco Bay Area Film Critics Circle	January 9, 2023	Best Original Score	Alexandre Desplat	Nominated	
Austin Film Critics Association	January 10, 2023	Best Animated Film	Pinocchio	Nominated	
Austin Film Critics Association	January 10, 2023	Best Adapted Screenplay	Guillermo del Toro and Patrick McHale	Nominated	
Austin Film Critics Association	January 10, 2023	Best Voice Acting/Animated/Digital Performance	Ewan McGregor	Nominated	
Golden Globe Awards	January 10, 2023	Best Animated Feature Film	Pinocchio	Won	
Golden Globe Awards	January 10, 2023	Best Original Score	Alexandre Desplat	Nominated	
Golden Globe Awards	January 10, 2023	Best Original Song	Alexandre Desplat, Roeben Katz, and Guillermo del Toro ("Ciao Papa")	Nominated	
Georgia Film Critics Association	January 13, 2023	Best Adapted Screenplay	Guillermo del Toro, Matthew Robbins, Gris Grimly, Patrick McHale	Nominated	
Georgia Film Critics Association	January 13, 2023	Best Original Score	Alexandre Desplat	Nominated	
Georgia Film Critics Association	January 13, 2023	Best Original Song	Alexandre Desplat, Roeban Katz, Guillermo del Toro ("Ciao Papa")	Nominated	
Georgia Film Critics Association	January 13, 2023	Best Animated Film	Pinocchio	Won	
Critics' Choice Movie Awards	January 15, 2023	Best Animated Feature	Pinocchio	Won	
Critics' Choice Movie Awards	January 15, 2023	Best Score	Alexandre Desplat	Nominated	
Critics' Choice Movie Awards	January 15, 2023	Best Song	"Ciao Papa"	Nominated	
Seattle Film Critics Society	January 17, 2023	Best Animated Feature	Pinocchio	Nominated	
Online Film Critics Society	January 23, 2023	Best Animated Feature	Pinocchio	Won	
Online Film Critics Society	January 23, 2023	Best Adapted Screenplay	Guillermo del Toro, Patrick McHale, Matthew Robbins	Nominated	
Visual Effects Society Awards	February 15, 2023	Outstanding Visual Effects in an Animated Feature	Aaron Weintraub, Jeffrey Schaper, Cameron Carson, Emma Gorbey	Won	
Visual Effects Society Awards	February 15, 2023	Outstanding Animated Character in an Animated Feature	Charles Greenfield, Peter Saunders, Shani Lang-Rinderspacher, Noel Estevez-Baker (Geppetto)	Nominated	
Visual Effects Society Awards	February 15, 2023	Outstanding Animated Character in an Animated Feature	Oliver Beale, Richard Pickersgill, Brian Leif Hansen, Kim Slate (Pinocchio)	Won	
Visual Effects Society Awards	February 15, 2023	Outstanding Created Environment in an Animated Feature	Warren Lawtey, Anjum Sakharkar, Javier Gonzalez Alonso, Quinn Carvalho (In the Stomach of a Sea Monster)	Won	
Visual Effects Society Awards	February 15, 2023	Emerging Technology Award	Richard Pickersgill, Glen Southern, Peter Saunders, Brian Leif Hansen (3D Printed Metal Armature)	Nominated	
Society of Composers & Lyricists Awards	February 15, 2023	Outstanding Original Song for a Comedy or Musical Visual Media Production	"Ciao Papa"	Won	
Houston Film Critics Society	February 18, 2023	Best Picture	Pinocchio	Nominated	
Houston Film Critics Society	February 18, 2023	Best Animated Feature	Pinocchio	Won	
Houston Film Critics Society	February 18, 2023	Best Original Score	Alexandre Desplat	Won	
Houston Film Critics Society	February 18, 2023	Best Original Song	"Ciao Papa"	Nominated	
Art Directors Guild Awards	February 18, 2023	Excellence in Production Design for an Animated Film	Guy Davis, Curt Enderle	Won	
British Academy Film Awards	February 19, 2023	Best Animated Film	Guillermo del Toro, Mark Gustafson, Gary Ungar, Alex Bulkley	Won	
British Academy Film Awards	February 19, 2023	Best Original Score	Alexandre Desplat	Nominated	
British Academy Film Awards	February 19, 2023	Best Production Design	Curt Enderle, Guy Davis	Nominated	
International Film Music Critics Association Awards	February 23, 2023	Best Original Score for an Animated Film	Alexandre Desplat	Won	
Hollywood Critics Association Awards	February 24, 2023	Best Animated Film	Pinocchio	Won	
Hollywood Critics Association Awards	February 24, 2023	Best Adapted Screenplay	Guillermo del Toro and Patrick McHale	Nominated	
Hollywood Critics Association Awards	February 24, 2023	Best Voice or Motion-Capture Performance	Ewan McGregor	Nominated	
Hollywood Critics Association Creative Arts Awards	February 24, 2023	Best Score	Alexandre Desplat	Nominated	
Hollywood Critics Association Creative Arts Awards	February 24, 2023	Best Visual Effects	Aaron Weintraub, Brian Leif Hansen, Georgina Hayns, and Ian Mackinnon	Nominated	
Minnesota Film Critics Alliance	February 25, 2023	Best Animated Feature	Pinocchio	Runner-up	
Producers Guild of America Awards	February 25, 2023	Outstanding Producer of Animated Theatrical Motion Pictures	Guillermo Del Toro, Gary Ungar, and Alex Bulkley	Won	
Annie Awards	February 25, 2023	Best Animated Feature	Pinocchio	Won	
Annie Awards	February 25, 2023	Outstanding Achievement for Animated Effects in an Animated Production	Aaron Weintraub, Warren Lawtey, Alireza Malmiri, Baptiste Malbranque, Mikhail Donchenko	Nominated	
Annie Awards	February 25, 2023	Outstanding Achievement for Character Animation in an Animated Feature Production	Tucker Barrie	Won	
Annie Awards	February 25, 2023	Outstanding Achievement for Directing in an Animated Feature Production	Guillermo del Toro, Mark Gustafson	Won	
Annie Awards	February 25, 2023	Outstanding Achievement for Editorial in an Animated Feature Production	Ken Schretzmann, Holly Klein, Emily Chiu, Hamilton Barrett	Nominated	
Annie Awards	February 25, 2023	Outstanding Achievement for Music in an Animated Feature Production	Alexandre Desplat, Roeban Katz, Guillermo del Toro, Patrick McHale	Won	
Annie Awards	February 25, 2023	Outstanding Achievement for Production Design in an Animated Feature Production	Curt Enderle, Guy Davis	Won	
Annie Awards	February 25, 2023	Outstanding Achievement for Voice Acting in an Animated Feature Production	Gregory Mann	Nominated	
Annie Awards	February 25, 2023	Outstanding Achievement for Voice Acting in an Animated Feature Production	David Bradley	Nominated	
Golden Reel Awards	February 26, 2023	Outstanding Achievement in Sound Editing – Feature Animation	Scott Martin Gershin, Masanobu "Tomi" Tomita, Andrew Vernon, Dan Gamache, Dan O'Connell, John Cucci	Won	
Golden Reel Awards	February 26, 2023	Outstanding Achievement in Music Editing – Feature Motion Picture	Lewis Morison, Eric Caudieux, Chris Barret	Nominated	
Satellite Awards	March 3, 2023	Best Motion Picture – Animated or Mixed Media	Pinocchio	Nominated	
Cinema Audio Society Awards	March 4, 2023	Outstanding Achievement in Sound Mixing for a Motion Picture – Animated	Jon Taylor, Frank Montaño, Peter Cobbin, Tavish Grade	Won	
USC Scripter Awards	March 4, 2023	Best Adapted Screenplay – Film	Guillermo del Toro, Patrick McHale, and Matthew Robbins	Nominated	
American Cinema Editors Awards	March 5, 2023	Best Edited Animated Feature Film	Ken Schretzmann, Holly Klein	Won	
Academy Awards	March 12, 2023	Best Animated Feature Film	Guillermo del Toro, Mark Gustafson, Gary Ungar and Alex Bulkley	Won	
Golden Trailer Awards	June 29, 2023	Best Animation / Family TV Spot (for a Feature Film)	"Dear Son" (REBEL)	Won	
Golden Trailer Awards	June 29, 2023	Best BTS/EPK for a Feature Film (Under 2 minutes)	"Tudum" (REBEL)	Nominated	
Saturn Awards	February 26, 2024	Best Animated Television Series	Guillermo del Toro's Pinocchio	Nominated	
