= Guillermo del Toro's Pinocchio (soundtrack) =

Guillermo del Toro's Pinocchio (Soundtrack from the Netflix Film)

Soundtrack album by Alexandre Desplat
- Released: December 9, 2022
- Recorded: 2021–2022
- Genre: Film soundtrack
- Length: 84:31
- Label: Columbia
- Producer: Alexandre Desplat

Alexandre Desplat chronology
The Lost King (2022)	Pinocchio (2022)	Father & Soldier (2023)

Singles from Pinocchio (Soundtrack from the Netflix Film)
- 1. "Ciao Papa" Released: November 18, 2022

Guillermo del Toro's Pinocchio (Soundtrack from the Netflix Film) is the soundtrack album to the 2022 stop-motion animated musical dark fantasy film of the same name. Based on the 1883 Italian novel The Adventures of Pinocchio by Carlo Collodi, and Gris Grimly's design from his 2002 edition of the novel, the film, directed by Guillermo del Toro and Mark Gustafson, stars Ewan McGregor, David Bradley, Gregory Mann, Burn Gorman, John Turturro, Ron Perlman, Finn Wolfhard, Cate Blanchett, Tim Blake Nelson, Christoph Waltz, and Tilda Swinton. The score is composed by Alexandre Desplat in his second collaboration with del Toro after The Shape of Water (2017). The album featuring the original score and songs were set for release digitally on December 9, 2022 and in physical formats on December 16 by Columbia Records.

== Background ==
On August 23, 2012, Australian musician Nick Cave was reported to be involved in the project, but could not do so and the film went into development hell, until Netflix brought the film rights and revived the project in October 2018. On January 8, 2020, Alexandre Desplat was reported to compose the film score, thereby collaborating with del Toro, for the second time after The Shape of Water (2017). While discussing the film's music in Deadline Hollywood's Sound & Screen interview, Desplat said, "Like in The Shape of Water, there are so many emotions. In both of these films, there are strong social and political content. In Pinocchio, it's fascism with the movie being set in 1930s Italy. All of this together creates tension that the music can convey."

"I think the real key to it was always the emotion, trying to keep the vibrant heart of Pinocchio beating, and make sure that we always feel this innocence that he has. He doesn't know anything about anything. But he believes in everything. He's so open-minded. That's the beautiful thing about Pinocchio."

— Desplat, on the music of Guillermo del Toro's Pinocchio.

As with most of the projects, Desplat began scoring for the film after seeing the film's rough cut since he likes to see the images to see how the actors move and interact with one another. The score for Pinocchio was created mostly using wooden instruments since Desplat likes "to find an ensemble of instruments that reflect the film or soul of the film" and the "softness" of the sound of wood. The sounds were implemented using assortment of woodwind, wooden percussions, strings, piano, harp, mandolin and guitar, and also an accordion made of wood.

Del Toro and Desplat made their maiden attempt in songwriting and composition, while Desplat's longtime friend and lyricist Roeban Katz had also contributed to the original songs. Desplat feels that working on original songs is "like a Lego game, as there is a big castle to build because there is this history of incredible songwriters before us for cinema and for animation — from the Sherman Brothers, Richard Rodgers to so many great songwriters. So you're trying to have a conversation with the past, and at the same time, you try to play with this Lego castle that you have in front of you and build the most beautiful object that you can." He compared the musical style of Pinocchio to that of Cole Porter and George Gershwin. The songs were interwoven into the film score, with new melodies being created. He added that "all the songs come back as instrumental motif through this score. They come back in many, many forms, different forms, shapes, tones, [tempo], and I think it gives the whole film continuity that would have been different if we would not have used the melody of the songs". The original songs were performed by the film's cast members, and all of them were recorded at various places. He added the songs are not lengthy, and it will not impact the film's storytelling.

== Composition ==
Del Toro wrote the original song "Ciao Papa," which he described as "the most moving song in the film, and the most important song. It talks about longing, it talks about the loss of a father, the loss of a son. It talks about the sort of wistful energy that, for me, is at the core of the tale of Pinocchio." Desplat added that the song was not interwoven into the score, hence it stands apart from the other musical numbers; he wanted it to be a unique moment focusing on the relationship between Pinocchio and Geppetto, and added "The combination of these two words — 'Ciao,' which is Italian, and 'Papa,' which works in any language — I felt that if the melody was as simple as these two words, it would be very easy to remember and to catch for anyone."

On "The Pine Cone" melody, Desplat wanted to capture Geppetto's grief in a pivotal moment, as he loses his child. Desplat set the theme "to be dramatic, and at the same time, extremely moving without being over the top or too romantic", adding that it is "difficult to find the music of grief". Desplat felt that Geppetto's son Carlo is the center of the film, in spite of his limited screen time, and that Pinocchio is the reincarnation of Carlo, adding, "It takes the whole film for Geppetto to admit that Pinocchio is his son replacing Carlo. That's what Geppetto wants — he wants to find his little son again that he lost during the First World War." Hence for "Carlo's theme", he wanted to make the melody as similar to both characters, saying "It's not only Carlo's theme. It's the theme of the little boy, of the lost soul — and of the hope that you have on your children to become one day, another person. As Pinocchio becomes Geppetto's son, the theme takes over and becomes Pinocchio's theme."

== Promotion and release ==
The track "Ciao Papa" was released as the single from the album on November 18. The original soundtrack was announced by Columbia Records on the same date and is set for release digitally on December 9, followed by a physical release on December 16.

== Live performances ==
Desplat conducted the film's score at Netflix Playlist, a showcase of music from film and television on November 7, 2022. Besides conducting the film's music, he also brought a young girl to perform "Ciao Papa" on stage. Steven Gizicki, the music supervisor of the film, had opined it as "one of Desplat's best scores". He also appeared at the Deadline Hollywood's Sound & Screen conference and conducted the 60-piece orchestra at the live performance of the film score.

== Track listing ==
All music is composed by Alexandre Desplat.

No.	Title	Lyrics	Performer(s)	Length
1.	"Better Tomorrows"	Roeban Katz	Ewan McGregor	4:16
2.	"Carlo's Theme"		(score)	2:10
3.	"My Son"	Guillermo del Toro	David Bradley	2:48
4.	"Going to Town"		(score)	3:11
5.	"The Pine Cone"		(score)	2:07
6.	"Sebastian J Cricket"		(score)	3:38
7.	"Geppetto's Creature"		(score)	4:48
8.	"Everything Is New to Me"	Katz, del Toro	Gregory Mann; Bradley	2:19
9.	"The Circus"		(score)	2:23
10.	"Pinocchio"		(score)	1:42
11.	"We Were a King Once"	Katz, del Toro	Christoph Waltz	2:34
12.	"Spazzatura"		(score)	2:56
13.	"A Wooden Boy"		(score)	2:21
14.	"Memory of Carlo"		(score)	1:57
15.	"Friendship With Candlewick"		(score)	1:25
16.	"Ciao Papa"	Katz, del Toro	Mann	2:48
17.	"Resurrection"		(score)	1:41
18.	"Pinocchio Has Left"		(score)	1:57
19.	"Small Lies"		(score)	0:49
20.	"Fatherland March"	Katz, del Toro, Patrick McHale	Mann	1:36
21.	"In the Army"		(score)	0:49
22.	"Pinocchio Soldier"		(score)	2:17
23.	"Volpe's Charm"		(score)	1:37
24.	"To Catania"		(score)	1:41
25.	"The Blue Fairy"		(score)	2:31
26.	"The Late Lamented"	del Toro, McHale	Tim Blake Nelson	2:17
27.	"The Sphinx"		(score)	1:39
28.	"Capice"		(score)	1:59
29.	"Pinocchio's Solitude"		(score)	0:58
30.	"Il Duce"		(score)	1:03
31.	"My Bubblegum"	Katz, del Toro	Mann	1:44
32.	"Paint Battle"		(score)	2:37
33.	"The Dogfish"		(score)	0:46
34.	"Shoot the Puppet"		(score)	5:55
35.	"The Mine"		(score)	2:15
36.	"Papa!"		(score)	0:49
37.	"Big Lies"		(score)	2:19
38.	"Saving Geppetto"		(score)	1:14
39.	"Pinocchio's Choice"		(score)	1:37
40.	"Big Baby II Duce March"	Katz, del Toro, McHale	Mann	1:36
41.	"Farewell to Geppetto"		(score)	0:23
Total length:				84:31

== Reception ==
Mark Feeney of the Boston Globe wrote, "Alexandre Desplat's score and songs — among other things, the movie's sort of a musical — are a prime contributor to the sentimentality." Robert Abele of the Los Angeles Times said, "The songs, though, by composer Alexandre Desplat and often sporting Del Toro's own lyrics, benefit from being interludes of feeling instead of big showy numbers, particularly the nicely turned 'Ciao Papa'". Patrick Gibbs of Slug Magazine called the score as "gorgeous and lively". Fred Topel of United Press International wrote, "The all new songs by Alexandre Desplat sound like a child making up a song as he goes along, rather than Disney songwriters."

== Release history ==
Release dates and formats for Guillermo del Toro's Pinocchio (Soundtrack from the Netflix Film)
Region	Date	Format(s)	Label	Ref.
Various	December 9, 2022	Digital download; streaming	Columbia	
Various	December 16, 2022	CD	Columbia	

== Accolades ==
The song "Ciao Papa" for the film, is intended to be a potential contender for the Best Original Song category at the 95th Academy Awards, according to Billboard magazine. Los Angeles Times critic Michael Ordoña hinted at the possibility of the song being nominated in various ceremonies, including the Academy Awards. However, it wasn't nominated.

Award	Date of ceremony	Category	Recipient(s)	Result	Ref.
Hollywood Music in Media Awards	November 16, 2022	Best Original Score in an Animated Film	Alexandre Desplat	Won	
Hollywood Music in Media Awards	November 16, 2022	Best Original Song in an Animated Film	Alexandre Desplat, Roeben Katz, and Guillermo del Toro ("Ciao Papa")	Won	
Washington D.C. Area Film Critics Association Awards	December 12, 2022	Best Original Score	Alexandre Desplat	Nominated	
Chicago Film Critics Association Awards	December 14, 2022	Best Original Score	Alexandre Desplat	Nominated	
Dallas–Fort Worth Film Critics Association	December 19, 2022	Best Musical Score	Alexandre Desplat	Won	
San Francisco Bay Area Film Critics Circle	January 9, 2023	Best Original Score	Alexandre Desplat	Nominated	
Golden Globe Awards	January 10, 2023	Best Original Score	Alexandre Desplat	Nominated	
Golden Globe Awards	January 10, 2023	Best Original Song	Alexandre Desplat, Roeben Katz, and Guillermo del Toro ("Ciao Papa")	Nominated	
Georgia Film Critics Association	January 13, 2023	Best Original Score	Alexandre Desplat	Nominated	
Georgia Film Critics Association	January 13, 2023	Best Original Song	Alexandre Desplat, Roeban Katz, Guillermo del Toro ("Ciao Papa")	Nominated	
Critics' Choice Movie Awards	January 15, 2023	Best Score	Alexandre Desplat	Nominated	
Critics' Choice Movie Awards	January 15, 2023	Best Song	"Ciao Papa"	Nominated	
Houston Film Critics Society	February 18, 2023	Best Original Score	Alexandre Desplat	Won	
Houston Film Critics Society	February 18, 2023	Best Original Song	"Ciao Papa"	Nominated	
British Academy Film Awards	February 19, 2023	Best Original Score	Alexandre Desplat	Nominated	
International Film Music Critics Association Awards	February 23, 2023	Best Original Score for an Animated Film	Alexandre Desplat	Won	
Hollywood Critics Association Creative Arts Awards	February 24, 2023	Best Score	Alexandre Desplat	Nominated	
Annie Awards	February 25, 2023	Outstanding Achievement for Music in an Animated Feature Production	Alexandre Desplat, Roeban Katz, Guillermo del Toro, Patrick McHale	Won	
