= Stephen Messer (author) =

American writer

Stephen Messer, pen name Zeno Alexander, is an American author of books for young readers.

Messer was born in Skowhegan, Maine and currently lives in Durham, North Carolina.

Windblowne (Random House 2010) was named to the New York Public Library's Children's Books 2010 list. The Library of Ever (Macmillan 2019, written as Zeno Alexander) was named one of Kirkus Reviews Best Books of the Year for 2019. The sequel, Rebel in the Library of Ever (Macmillan 2020), received a starred review from Booklist.

== Published works ==
- Windblowne (Random House 2010)
- The Death of Yorik Mortwell (Random House 2011)
- The Library of Ever (Macmillan 2019)
- Rebel in the Library of Ever (Macmillan 2020)
