= Isaac Ezban =

Mexican film director

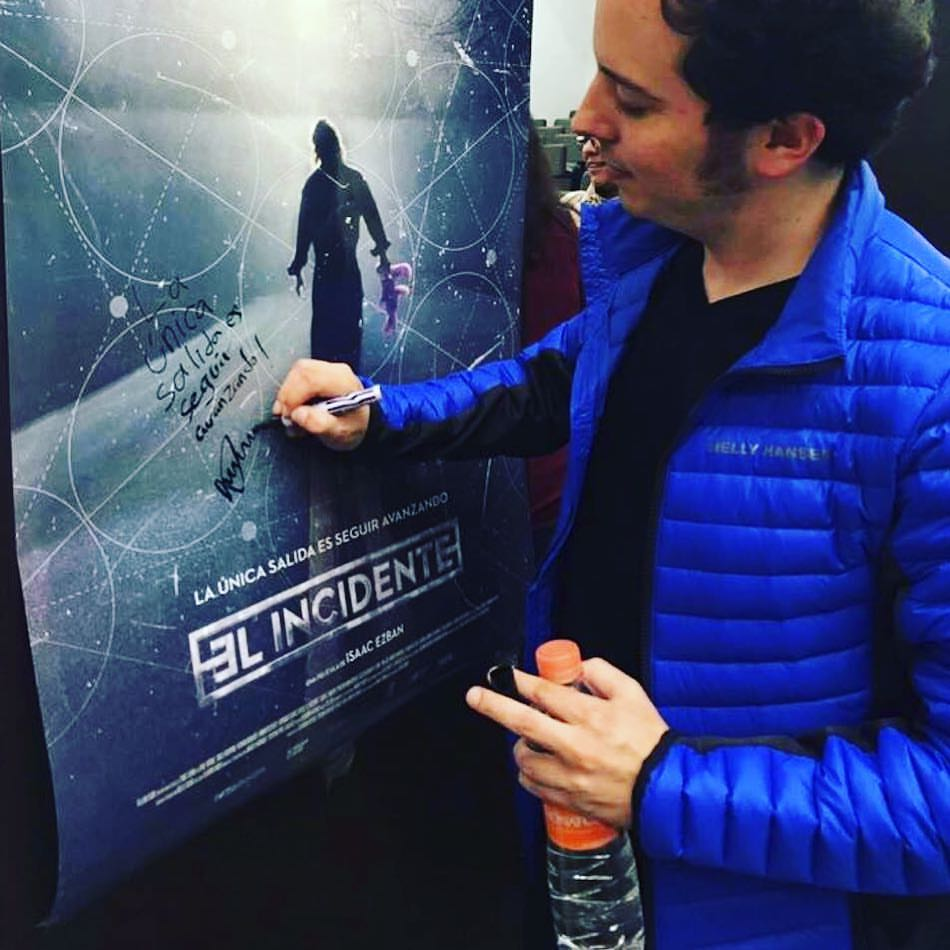
- Born: 15 April 1986 (age 40); Mexico City, Mexico
- Occupations: Director, writer and producer
- Years active: 2007–present
- Spouse: Miriam Mercado (2012–present)
- Children: 2

Isaac Ezban (born 15 April 1986) is a Mexican film director, writer and producer. He is best known for his work on the films The Incident, The Similars, Parallel and Párvulos: Children of the Apocalypse.

== Life and career ==
Ezban was born and raised in Mexico City, in a Jewish family. He studied communication with a major in film at the Universidad Iberoamericana, drama in London at The Method Studio and filmmaking in New York at the New York Film Academy. He wrote four short novels before working in the film industry.

Ezban's first feature film, The Incident, starring Raúl Méndez, Nailea Norvind, Hernan Mendoza, Humberto Busto and Fernando Alvarez Rebeil, was premiered at the Cannes Film Festival in the Blood Window Midnight Galas. It won the award for Best Original Screenplay at the Expresión en Corto International Film Festival, the Mexico Primero Award at Los Cabos International Film Festival and 16 other awards, and was praised by Guillermo del Toro. His second feature film, The Similars, starting Gustavo Sánchez Parra, was premiered at Fantastic Fest and the Sitges Film Festival. It also won the award for Best Latin American Film in Sitges and the press award in Morbido.

In 2016, Ezban was hired by Bron Studios to direct his third feature film and first English language film, Parallel, starring Aml Ameen, Martin Wallström, Georgia King, Mark O'Brien, Alyssa Diaz and Kathleen Quinlan. He is scheduled to direct an upcoming feature film based on the Dan Simmons novel, Summer Of Night for Sony Pictures.

== Filmography ==
Year	Film	Director	Writer	Producer	Notes
2007	Subway to Hell	✓	✓	✓	Short film
2008	Cookie	✓	✓	✓	Short film
2008	Kosher Spaghetti	✓	✓	✓	Short film
2009	Hambre	✓	✓	✓	Short film
2009	El judío que todos llevamos dentro	✓	✓	✗	Short film
2009	El secreto de Martín Cordiani	✓	✓	✓	Short film
2010	Cosas feas	✓	✓	✓	Short film
2011	Ocean Blues	✗	✗	✓	Feature film
2012	Mute	✗	✗	✓	Short film
2013	Heaven & Hell	✗	✗	✓	Short film
2013	In Search of Dylan	✗	✗	✓	Documentary
2014	Barbarous Mexico	✓	✓	✗	Feature film
2014	The Incident	✓	✓	✓	Feature film
2015	Presagio	✗	✗	✓	Feature film
2015	The Similars	✓	✓	✓	Feature film
2018	Parallel	✓	✗	✗	Feature film
2019	Deathcember	✓	✓	✗	Anthology film. Directed the short film “Villancicos”
2021	Mal de Ojo	✓	✓	✓	Feature film
2023	La Hora Marcada	✓	✓	✗	Miniseries. Directed 1 episode
2024	Párvulos: Children of the Apocalypse	✓	✓	✓	Feature film
