= Lo Que Me Haces Sentir =

Studio album by Zemmoa
- Released: November 18, 2021
- Genre: Electropop; Latin pop; synth-pop
- Length: 52 minutes
- Label: Zemmporio Records
- Producer: Juan Soto, Fernando Burgos, Martin Grinfeld, Imanol González, America Fendi, Zemmoa

Zemmoa chronology
Covers (2018)	Lo Que Me Haces Sentir (2021)	The Early Years (2023)

Singles from Lo Que Me Haces Sentir
- 1. "Velocidad" Released: February 24, 2021; 2. "Ya Te Vi" Released: April 7, 2021; 3. "Pendejo" Released: May 3, 2021; 4. "Mi Amor Soy Yo" Released: June 21, 2021; 5. "Los 12 Pasos" Released: July 30, 2021; 6. "El Trono" Released: September 9, 2021; 7. "Como La Primera Vez" Released: November 5, 2021; 8. "La Música Puede Llevarte" Released: November 18, 2021

Lo Que Me Haces Sentir is the fourth studio album by Mexican singer Zemmoa, released digitally and on vinyl on 2021.

== Background ==
Produced by Juan Soto, Fernando Burgos from Hello Seahorse!, Martin Grinfeld, Imanol González, America Fendi and Zemmoa.

Zemmoa presented her new singles at Chicago's National Museum of Mexican Art's Sonido 18 Fest celebrated at Harrison Park next to Girl Ultra, Mi Sobrino Memo, and Sussie 4.

On the album, Zemmoa includes "Te Quiero" and her piano-only version, "Te Quiero Mucho", which she interprets as a bolero.

Zemmoa shared that her favorite song from this album is “Nota De Voz”, inspired by the poems from Pita Amor and "Los amorosos" by Jaime Sabines.

== Singles ==
=== Velocidad ===
In 2021 she presented her song "Velocidad", which is the first single from the fourth album Lo Que Me Haces Sentir and in her video she drives around Mexico City in her red convertible car that ends up in flames.

=== Ya Te Vi ===
Her second video from this album is «Ya te vi» featuring Nomi Ruiz where they are playing cards until they find The Devil (Tarot card) symbolizing a toxic relationship.

=== Pendejo ===
In her video "Pendejo" she features some of her friend performing a lip sync of her song while protesting against transphobia, misogyny, patriarchy and machismo; Alejandra Quesada, Alexis De Anda, Luisa Almaguer, Andy Walrus Perrilla Mirreyna, Agustina Quinci, Burbiculo, Dani Tormento, Derretida, Giselle Elias Karam, Enriqueta Arias, Jessy Bulbo from Las Ultrasonicas, Juliette Kovac, Miss Loreto, Hababy LaGuapiss, Laura De Ita, Miss Mara, Dany Torres NegraConda, Noa Sainz, Marian Ruzzi, Melon Rivas, Ophelia Pastrana, Paulina Barceinas, Pambo, rRoxymore, Rohl Sánchez, Miley Sayrus, Sarah Fanelli, Tamerlane and Vanessa Zamora.

=== Mi Amor Soy Yo ===
In her song Mi Amor Soy Yo features Tessa Ía (Camila Sodi's sister) and the high-energy duet Trans-X which samples El Cóndor Pasa (song) while having at sleepover or slumber party at her parents house in Cuernavaca.

=== Los 12 Pasos ===
Her video "Los 12 pasos" references the Time Warp (song) from Rocky Horror Picture Show and an Alcoholics Anonymous meeting.

=== El Trono ===
The music video for "El Trono" has a funky rhythm similar to Grace Jones and she dances in front of a king's throne and a Mona Lisa painting with the face of Gloria Trevi.

=== Como La Primera Vez ===
In her video "Como La Primera Vez" featuring Valentina (drag queen) contestant from RuPaul's Drag Race (season 9) and the transgender DJ and Mexican producer America Fendi.

=== La Música Puede Llevarte ===
Her new song "La Música Puede Llevarte" has some dream pop influences from Jessica 6, chillout, TR/ST and Beach House.

== Track listing ==
No.	Title	Length
1.	"Intro"	0:33
2.	"Ya te Vi" (ft. Nomi Ruiz)	3:13
3.	"El Trono"	3:44
4.	"La Música Puede Llevarte"	4:46
5.	"Feliz Cumpleaños"	1:25
6.	"Te Quiero"	3:06
7.	"Pendejo"	3:24
8.	"¿Por Qué No Me Has Llamado?"	0:04
9.	"Malos Entendidos"	4:38
10.	"Los 12 Pasos"	4:13
11.	"Mi Amor Soy Yo" (featuring Tessa Ía and Trans-X)	2:56
12.	"Velocidad"	3:37
13.	"Nota De Voz"	4:20
14.	"Demonios"	3:38
15.	"Contéstame"	0:33
16.	"Como La Primera Vez" (featuring Valentina (drag queen) and America Fendi)	3:45
17.	"Outro"	0:35
18.	"Te Quiero Mucho"	2:53

== LQMHS Remixes ==
- Malos Entendidos - Tadeo Tovar Remix
- Pendejo - Zombies In Miami Club Mix
- Demonios - DJ Guapis Remix
- Ya Te Vi featuring Nomi Ruiz - MONVCO Bachata Remork
- Mi Amor Soy Yo featuring Tessa Ia and Trans-X - The MT Remix
- Como La Primera Vez featuring America Fendi and Valentina - Nico Redub
- Los 12 Pasos featuring MANCANDY - Mister Merengue Mix
- Velocidad - Paurro Remix

== Personnel ==
- Zemmoa – piano, lyrics, vocals
- Nomi Ruiz – lyrics, vocals
- Tessa Ía – vocals
- Valentina (drag queen) – vocals
- America Fendi – vocals
- Fernando Burgos – music
- Tomas Jackson – bass
- Kmaron – guitar
- Pascal Langurand Trans-X – keytar

== Appearances ==
Zemmoa at the National Museum of Mexican Art, Chicago in 2018.

To celebrate 15 years of her musical career, she announced the tour “Lo Que Tour Me Haces Sentir”, at Foro Indie Rocks with Mancandy, Manu NNa and Amelia Waldorf.
