= Mi Amor Soy Yo =

Single by Zemmoa, Tessa Ía and Trans-X

from the album Lo Que Me Haces Sentir
- Language: Spanish
- Released: June 21, 2021
- Recorded: 2020
- Genre: Electropop
- Label: Zemmporio Records
- Songwriters: Tessa Ía, Zemmoa, Trans-X
- Producer: Juan Soto

Zemmoa, Tessa Ía and Trans-X singles chronology
"Pendejo" (2021)	"Mi Amor Soy Yo" (2021)	"Los 12 Pasos" (2021)

"Mi Amor Soy Yo" is an electropop song about self-acceptance co-written by Zemmoa, Tessa Ía (Camila Sodi's sister), and the high-energy duet Trans-X, and produced by Juan Soto. The song samples "El Cóndor Pasa".

== Music video ==
The video shows Zemmoa and Tessa Ía having at sleepover or slumber party at her parents house in Cuernavaca.

== Reception ==
The song went viral on Spotify surpassing one million plays in its first year.
