= Are U Ready? =

Single by Pakito

from the album Video
- Released: March 14, 2007
- Recorded: September 2006
- Genre: Electronic
- Length: 3:27
- Label: Universal Licensing Music
- Songwriter(s): Julien Ranouil; Xavier Longuepée; David Toinet
- Producer(s): Julien Ranouil

Pakito singles chronology
"Moving on Stereo" (2006)	"Are U Ready?" (2007)

Alternative cover
- First cover

"Are U Ready?" is a dance song recorded by French DJ Pakito. It was the third and last single from his debut album Video, after the previous two European hits "Living on Video" and "Moving on Stereo", and was released in March 2007 in Finland, and two months later in the other countries. "Are U Ready?" was a top ten hit in Poland, Finland and France (where it reached its highest position #2), but achieved a moderate success in Belgium.

The music, which uses a sample from Groove Coverage's 2000 song, "Are U Ready", was remixed by Julien Ranouil (as for Pakito's previous single), Xavier Longuepée and David Toinet, and the single was published by Universal Music. The words "Are U Ready" are the only lyrics of "Are U Ready?", repeated throughout the song by a female voice.

== Formats and track listings ==
CD single

1. "Are U Ready?" (Radio Edit) (3:27)
2. "Are U Ready?" (Remix) (6:03)
3. "Are U Ready?" (Short Edit) (3:34)
4. "Are U Ready?" (Krafft Short Mix) (3:10)
5. "Are U Ready?" (Krafft Mix) (6:53)

CD maxi (April 25, 2007)

1. "Are U Ready?" (Radio Edit) (3:27)
2. "Are U Ready?" (Short Mix) (3:34)
3. "Are U Ready?" (Krafft Short Mix) (3:10)
4. "Are U Ready?" (Remix) (6:03)
5. "Are U Ready?" (Krafft Mix) (6:53)
6. "Are U Ready?" (Extended) (6:01)
7. "Are U Ready?" (Swindlers Mix) (5:50)

Digital download

1. "Are U Ready?" (Radio Edit) (3:27)

== Charts ==
Chart (2007)	Peak position
Belgian (Flanders) Singles Chart	37
Belgian (Wallonia) Singles Chart	12
Dutch Mega Top 100	11
Finnish Singles Chart	7
French SNEP Singles Chart	2

End of year chart (2007)	Position
Belgian (Wallonia) Singles Chart	81
French Singles Chart	43
