= Camino a Marte =

- Directed by: Humberto Hinojosa
- Written by: Anton Goenechea; Humberto Hinojosa
- Starring: Luis Gerardo Méndez; Camila Sodi; Tessa Ia
- Cinematography: Guillermo Garza
- Edited by: Joaquim Martí
- Production companies: Filmadora Nacional; Tigre Pictures
- Distributed by: Videocine
- Release date: December 1, 2017 (Mexico)
- Running time: 93 minutes
- Country: Mexico
- Language: Spanish

Camino a Marte is a 2017 Mexican film directed by Humberto Hinojosa. The film starred by Luis Gerardo Méndez, Camila Sodi and Tessa Ia. The film premiered on December 1, 2017 in Mexico.

== Plot ==
Emilia (Tessa Ia) is a young woman who has cancer and only a few days left to live. A news that drives her to embark on a journey with her friend Violeta (Camila Sodi) in Baja California. On the way, they meet an alien who is nicknamed Mark (Luis Gerardo Méndez).

== Cast ==
- Luis Gerardo Méndez as Mark
- Camila Sodi as Violeta
- Tessa Ía as Emilia
- Andrés Almeida as Jake
- Rodrigo Corea as Empleado en Tienda
