= C'est moi (disambiguation) =

C'est moi may refer to:

- A poem by Marceline Desbordes-Valmore
- "C'est moi" (Jérôme song), 1974
- "C'est moi" (Lerner and Loewe song), 1981
- "C'est moi" (Marie-Mai song), 2009
- C'est moi (album), 2025 album by Zemmoa
