= Sunrise (Here I Am) =

Single by Ratty
- Released: 5 February 2000
- Studio: Sheffield Underground Studios, Hamburg
- Genre: Trance
- Length: 3:17
- Label: Kontor Records
- Composers: Dave "Bass" Parker; Silvo; Ed Harris; Finn Reder
- Producer: Ratty

Ratty singles chronology
"Sunrise (Here I Am)" (2000)	"Living on Video" (2001)

"Sunrise (Here i Am)" is the debut single by trance project and Scooter alias Ratty, it was released on 5 February 2001 and was subsequently added to the A State of Trance Classics album in 2013.

== Track listings ==
=== Maxi-single ===
1. "Sunrise (Here I Am) (Radio Edit)" — 3:40
2. "Sunrise (Here I Am) (Club Mix)" — 7:30
3. "Sunrise (Here I Am) (Instrumental)" — 5:39
4. "Sunrise (Here I Am) (Dub Mix)" — 6:10

=== 12-inch ===
1. "Sunrise (Here I Am) (Club Mix)" — 7:30
2. "Sunrise (Here I Am) (Dub Mix)" — 6:10
3. "Sunrise (Here I Am) (Instrumental)" — 5:42

=== UK-maxi ===
1. "Sunrise (Here I Am) (Radio Edit)" — 2:45
2. "Sunrise (Here I Am) (Club Mix)" — 7:30
3. "Sunrise (Here I Am) (Instrumental)" — 5:39

== Chart performance ==
Chart performance for "Sunrise (Here I Am)" in 2001
Chart (2001)	Peak position
UK (Official Singles Chart)	51
UK (Official Dance Chart)	6
