= Pakito =

French musician

- Birth name: Julien Ranouil
- Also known as: Karlux, Glitch Project
- Born: 26 January 1981 (age 44); Bergerac, Aquitaine, France
- Origin: France
- Genres: Eurodance, house, electro house, trance
- Occupation(s): DJ, record producer
- Years active: 2004–present
- Labels: Electro V, Pan Music, Universal Music
- Website: www.pakito.rocks

Julien Ranouil (French pronunciation: [ʒyljɛ̃ ʁanuj]; born 26 January 1981), known by his stage name Pakito (/pæˈkɪtoʊ/), is a French electronic dance DJ and record producer. His cover of Trans-X's "Living on Video" reached number one on France's singles chart. Later hits are "Moving on Stereo" and "Are U Ready". So far his music style can be best determined as Eurodance. His name is taken from 'Paquito el Chocolatero', a famous pasodoble dance from Alicante, in the Comunidad Valenciana region of Spain.

His album Video was released on 8 November 2006 in the United States.

== Discography ==
Pakito "Funky Groove" (2006)
24 second sample from Pakito's "Funky Groove"

=== Albums ===
- 2006: Video

=== Singles ===
Year	Song	France Dance Chart	Spain Dance Chart	NL Top 40	Belgium Ultratop 50	SWE Dance Chart	FIN Dance Chart	SVK Dance Chart	Album
2006	"Living on Video"	1	1	7	12	14	9	6	Video
2006	"Moving on Stereo"	5	6	9	—	—	3	2	Video
2007	"Are U Ready?"	2	—	14	41	—	7	—	Video
2008	"You Wanna Rock"	—	—	—	—	—	—	—	
2008	"Electro Music"	—	—	—	—	—	—	2	
2009	"Harmony"	—	—	—	—	—	—	—	
2009	"Living on Video 2.9"	—	—	—	—	—	—	—	
2017	"Accordion"	—	—	—	—	—	—	—	

=== Bootlegs ===
- 2006: "Moving to the Beat" (Pakito vs. Black & White Brothers)
