= Naian Gonzalez Norvind =

Mexican actress and writer

Naian González Norvind
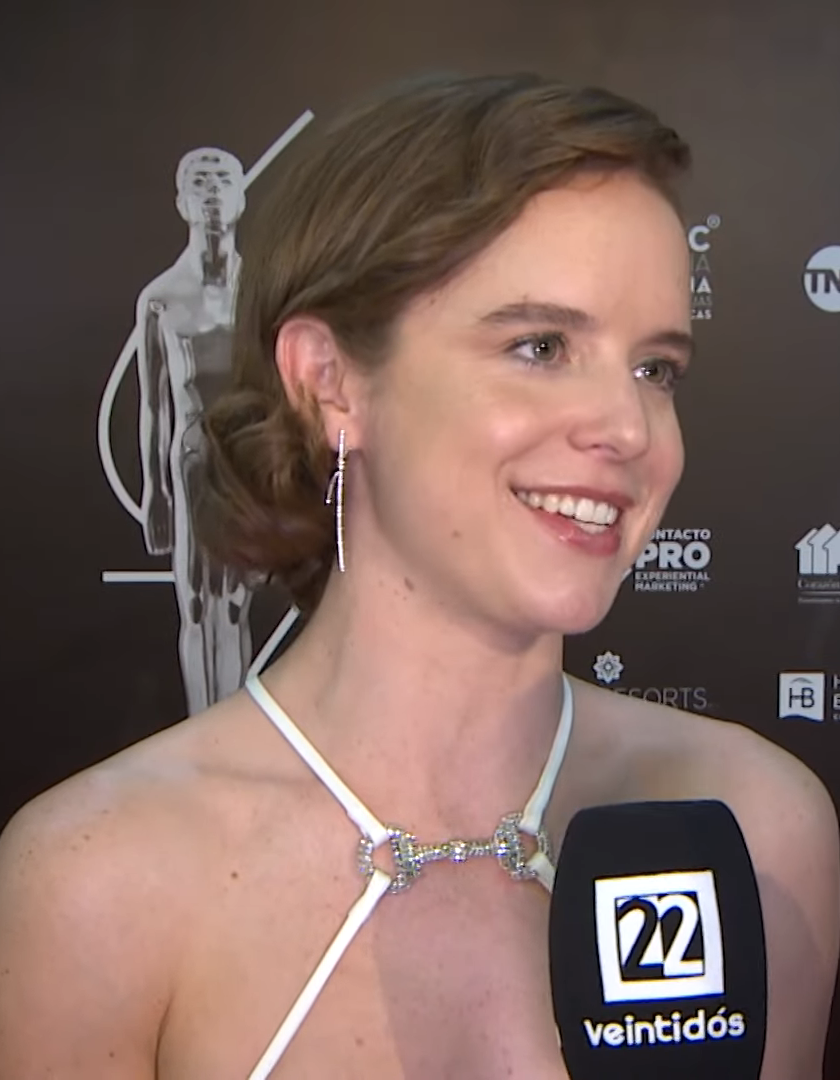
- Born: Naian González Norvind; 7 February 1992 (age 34); Mexico City, Mexico
- Education: Sorbonne University; London Academy of Music and Dramatic Art
- Occupation: Actress
- Years active: 2011–present
- Mother: Nailea Norvind
- Relatives: Tessa Ía (sister); Camila Sodi (half-sister); Eva Norvind (grandmother)

Naian González Norvind (born February 7, 1992) is a Mexican actress, and writer. She is the daughter of the Mexican actress Nailea Norvind.

== Early life ==
Norvind was born to Fernando Gonzalez Parra and actress Nailea Norvind. She is the granddaughter of Norwegian-Mexican actress Eva Norvind, and through her she is of Finnish and Russian descent.

Norvind is the younger half-sister of actress Camila Sodi and the older sister of actress Tessa Ía.

== Career ==
She has performed on stage and acted in Mexican TV series and films. In her interview to Mexican newspaper Milenio, she said that she was not afraid of shooting at Tepito (crime rate) for the Mexican show Crónica de castas.

She is cast as Mad Hatter's sister Alice Tetch, in season 3 of Gotham.

She is cast as Christie Watkins in "Backstabbers" the 6th episode of the 6th season of the CBS police procedural drama Blue Bloods on October 23, 2015. She reprised the role in "Erasing History" the 13th episode of the 8th season of the series on Friday, January 19, 2018. In 2018 she starred as the protagonist of Leona, a drama centered on Mexico City's Syrian Jewish community. In 2020 she appeared as tragic protagonist in Michel Franco's dramatic film New Order. In 2023 she played the role of Dr. Maya Castillo, a cognitive scientist, in the 2nd season of the Invasion TV series on Apple TV+.

== Filmography ==
=== Film ===
| Year | Title | Role | Notes | Refs. |
|---|---|---|---|---|
| 2011 | Lluvia de Luna | Lisa | Credited as Naián González | |
| 2011 | Sand | | Short film | |
| 2012 | Everybody's Got Somebody... Not Me | María | Credited as Naian Daeva | |
| 2012 | Los Salgado | The daughter | Short film | |
| 2012 | Entre la ficción y yo | | Short film | |
| 2016 | Sr. Pig | Mormon Susan | | |
| 2016 | Deshojando Margaritas | Iris | Credited as Naian Daeva | |
| 2016 | Sangre alba | | Short film | |
| 2017 | Rebel in the Rye | Queens Girl | | |
| 2017 | Las siete muertes | Nuria | | |
| 2018 | Leona | Ariela | Also writer and producer | |
| 2019 | South Mountain | Dara | | |
| 2019 | The Working Title Is Zorro | Laura | Short film | |
| 2019 | Cubby | Briahna | | |
| 2019 | Chemistry of Mood | Cara | Short film | |
| 2020 | Contar el amor | | | |
| 2020 | New Order | Marianne / bride | | |
| 2020 | Tapabocas | Hermana | Short film | |
| 2020 | Aztech | Girl | Segment: "Atl" | |
| 2021 | Esther in Wonderland | Esther | Short film | |
| 2022 | Sex, Shame and Tears 2 | Matilde / Carlos and Ana's daughter | | |
| 2023 | Good Savage | Maggie | | |
| 2024 | Corina | Corina | | |
| 2025 | The Follies | | Netflix film | |

=== Television ===
| Year | Title | Role | Notes | Refs. |
|---|---|---|---|---|
| 2012 | Pacientes | Corina | Recurring role, 26 episodes | |
| 2014 | Crónica de castas | Lucía | Recurring role, 7 episodes | |
| 2015 | The Devil You Know | Abigail Parris | Episode: "Pilot" | |
| 2016 | Gotham | Alice Tetch | First time credited as Naian Gonzalez Norvind, 3 episodes | |
| 2015–2018 | Blue Bloods | Chrissie Watskins | 2 episodes | |
| 2019 | Chicago Med | Lisa Bell | Episode: "The Space Between Us" | |
| 2022 | Amsterdam | Nadia | Main role | |
| 2022 | Pena Ajena | Emma | 2 episodes | |
| 2023 | Invasion | Maya Castillo | Main role, 10 episodes | |
