= Los héroes del norte =

- Genre: Comedy, music, romance
- Created by: Gustavo Loza
- Written by: Gustavo Loza, Agustín Tapia, Álvaro Curiel
- Directed by: Gustavo Loza, Chava Cartas, Álvaro Curiel, Agustín Tapia
- Starring: Miguel Rodarte, Humberto Busto, Armando Hernández, Andrés Almeida, Marius Biegai, Patricia Reyes Spíndola, María Aura, Karla Souza, Ignacio Guadalupe
- Country of origin: Mexico
- Original language: Spanish
- No. of seasons: 3
- No. of episodes: 52 ([[es:Anexo:Episodios de Los héroes del norte|list of episodes]])

Production
- Executive producers: Mariano Carrasco, Mariana Arredondo, Ana Laura Rascón
- Producer: Gustavo Loza
- Production companies: Adicta Films, Televisa

Original release
- Network: Bandamax
- Release: September 20, 2010 – December 3, 2012

Los Héroes del Norte (The Heroes of the North) is a Mexican TV comedy series about the adventures of a fictional musical group named Los Héroes del Norte. The show was created by Gustavo Loza and produced by Adicta Films for Televisa. It premiered on September 20, 2010 on the Bandamax cable television music channel.

== Cast ==
=== Band members ===
- Miguel Rodarte as Zechariah III
- Humberto Busto as Apolinar Caborca
- Armando Hernández as Faquir
- Andrés Almeida as Botarga (Motley)
- Marius Biegai as El Menona (The Mennonite)

=== Regular cast ===
- Patricia Reyes Spíndola as Doña Olegaria (band manager)
- María Aura as Margaret (Apolinar's wife)
- Karla Souza as Prisca (Menona's niece)
- Ignacio Guadalupe as Procopio (band security officer)
- Greta Cervantes as Perla (Procopio's daughter)

=== Recurring cast ===
- Joaquín Cosio as Don Hassan
- Adrián Uribe as El Junior
- Jesús Ochoa as El Comandante
- Aislinn Derbez as Natasha

=== Guest stars ===
- Katerine Ricardo as Caridad (credited as Katerina Pérez Ricardo)

== Production ==
In 2009, Adicta Films presented the pilot episode to Televisa. The pilot was filmed in Acaxiloco (Cuetzalan del Progreso), Tehuacán, Ajalpan, Altepexi, and Zapotitlán Salinas in the Mexican State of Puebla. In 2010, Televisa gave the show the green light and on August 19 of that year filming began in San Luis Potosí. Filming continued for four months and one week, the only series that Televisa produced that year. The new RED Camera was used.

For the second season, production moved to cities in other countries, including Los Angeles, California, in addition to Mexican cities like in Tijuana, Chihuahua and Mexico City. Morocco was considered but was ruled out due to the ongoing conflict and racism there.

The cast members gave concerts and shows in several cities in Mexico. Their first shows were held in the city of Oaxaca on March 15 and 16, 2012.

== Criticisms ==
- In the episode that revealed that Apolinar Caborca is Guatemalan, the band members speak derogatorily about the country, in particular towards Guatemalan singer-songwriter Ricardo Arjona, likening him as a "truck singer", and calling the inhabitants of the country beggars. This generated criticism and protests in Guatemala and led to a call to boycott all Televisa products on broadcast television and cable.
- The Attorney General's Office of Mexico City suspended the filming of the series because of changes the series made to two acronyms associated with their office. PGR (Office of the Mexican Attorney-General) was changed to "PPR" and SIEDO (Assistant Attorney General's Office for Special Investigations on Organized Crime) was changed to "SIEGO", a play on the Spanish word "ciego" (blind).

== Trivia ==
- Lo Intentamos ("We tried")—the song that propels the group to fame in the first season—enjoyed great success on radio stations in 2009 in both Mexico and the United States. The song was composed by Espinoza Paz. During the Bandamax Awards, Paz credits Zacarías—the purported songwriter on the show—as the song's composer.
- In the episode when Doña Olegaria meets the musicians her hair was real. From then on, she wears wigs.
- Both El Menona and Prisca are from a town where they practice Mennonite Anabaptism. Given her ignorance of the customs of the world outside her community Prisca constantly asks, "Is this what Catholics are like?"
- In the second season, Faquir's earring changes sides.
- Faquir was blond in the first season, in the second he dyed his hair black.
- Both Los Héroes del Norte and Las Heroinas del Sur have performed songs in homage to deceased singers.
  - "Un Puño de Tierra" by Antonio Aguilar
  - "El Sirenito" by Rigo Tovar
  - "Amor Prohibido" by Selena (performed by Las Heroinas del Sur)
  - "Vete Ya" by Valentin Elizalde
- The first two episodes of Season 3 were filmed in Havana, Cuba.

== Awards and nominations ==
TVyNovelas awards
Year	Category	Person	Result
2012	Best series	Gustavo Loza	Winner
2013	Best series	Gustavo Loza	Winner
