= Cualquier parecido =

Mexican comedy-drama television series

- Genre: Comedy drama
- Created by: Camila Sodi; Natasha Ybarra-Klor
- Showrunner: Natasha Ybarra-Klor
- Written by: Natasha Ybarra-Klor; Camila Sodi; María Ramírez; Amanda Escalate; César Tejeda; Lauri Walker
- Directed by: Karina Minujin
- Starring: Camila Sodi; Antonio Gaona; Claudette Maillé; Valeria Vera; Danny Perea; Danae Reynaud
- Country of origin: Mexico
- Original language: Spanish
- No. of seasons: 1
- No. of episodes: 7

Production
- Executive producers: Natasha Ybarra-Klor; Camila Sodi; Jaime B. Ramos; Andrea de la Torre; José "Fidji" Viggiano; Fernando Gastón; Federico Cuervo; Juan "JC" Acosta
- Producers: Epigmenio Ibarra; Verónica Velasco
- Editors: Cheryl Sánchez; Camilo Campi Vásquez
- Production companies: Paramount Television International Studios; Argos Comunicación

Original release
- Network: Vix
- Release: 25 August 2023

Cualquier parecido is a Mexican comedy drama streaming television series created by Camila Sodi and Natasha Ybarra-Klor. It stars Sodi as Carlota, an actress who, after going through a divorce, begins a journey of rediscovery. It premiered on Vix on 25 August 2023.

== Cast ==
=== Main ===
- Camila Sodi as Carlota
- Antonio Gaona
- Claudette Maillé
- Valeria Vera
- Danny Perea
- Danae Reynaud

=== Guest stars ===
- Jencarlos Canela
- Luis Ernesto Franco
- Uriel del Toro
- Roberto Manrique
- Christian Chávez

== Production ==
Production of the series began on 18 April 2022. The series is produced by Paramount Television International Studios and Argos Comunicación. On 14 August 2023, it was announced that the series would premiere on Vix on 25 August 2023.

== Episodes ==
No.	Title	Original release date
1	"Los ataques de pánico y los premios"	25 August 2023
2	"Felipe y Lizzie"	25 August 2023
3	"Rogelio y el celibato"	25 August 2023
4	"Rodrigo y el divorcio"	25 August 2023
5	"El Tuluminati y la Ayahusca"	25 August 2023
6	"Darío, las princesas no taaaan princesas y los límites"	25 August 2023
7	"Los caminos de la vida"	25 August 2023
