= Nailea Norvind =

Mexican theater, television and film actress

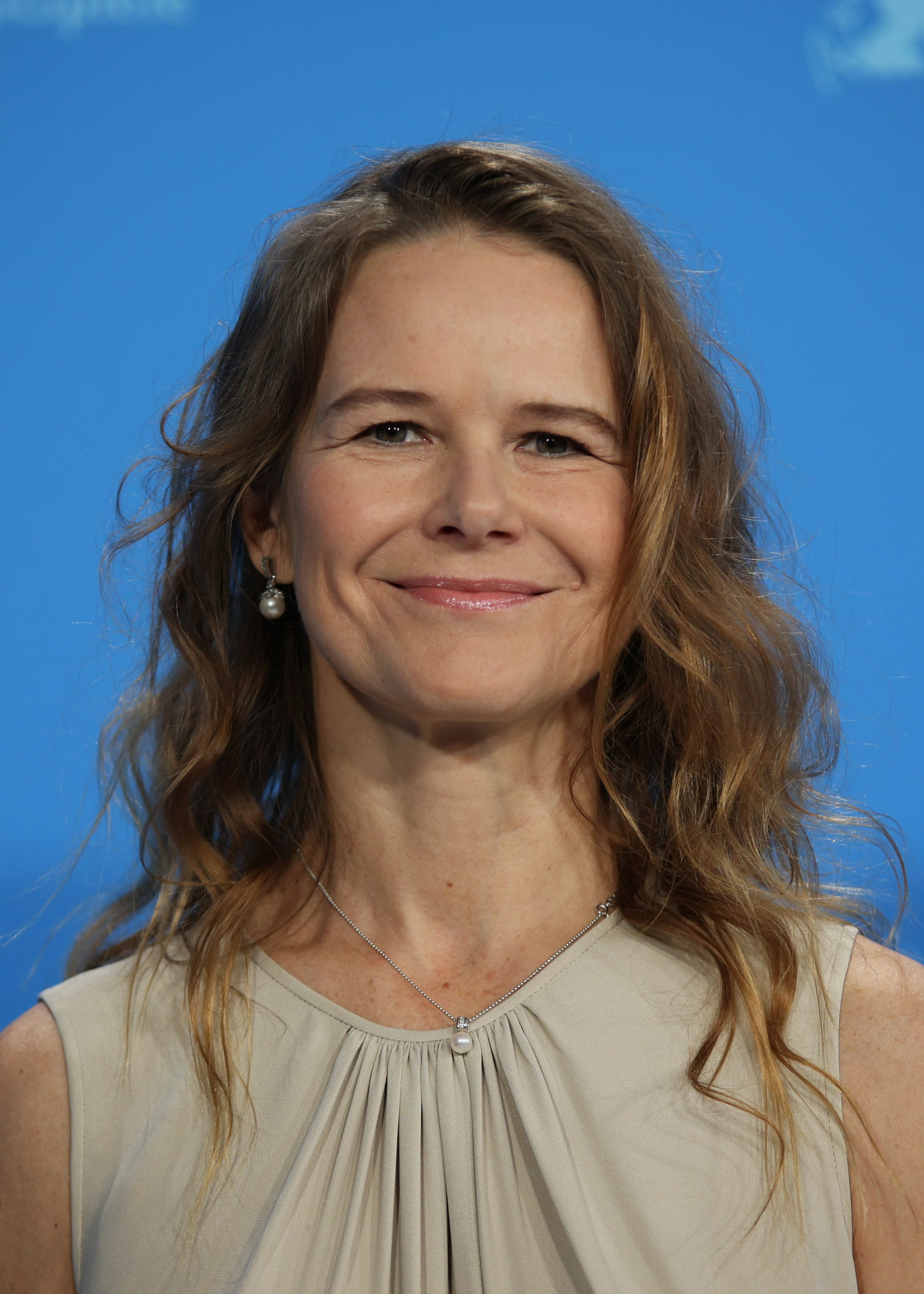
- Norvind at the 72nd Berlin International Film Festival, 2022
- Born: Nailea Norvind; 16 February 1970 (age 56); Mexico City, Mexico
- Occupation: Actress
- Years active: 1976–present
- Height: 5 ft 6 in (1.68 m)
- Spouse: Fernando González Parra (1988–1997)
- Children: Naian González Norvind; Tessa Ía
- Mother: Eva Norvind
- Relatives: Georg Kajanus (uncle)

Nailea Norvind (born 16 February 1970) is a Mexican theater, television and film actress. She is best known for her role as Leonor in the telenovela Quinceañera, as well as appeared in the critically acclaimed 1987 film Gaby: A True Story. She was nominated for the Ariel Award for Best Supporting Actress in 2012 for her role as Nina in the film La Otra Familia.

== Biography ==
Nailea Norvind is the daughter of Norwegian-born counselor, dominatrix, writer, producer, director and former actress Eva Norvind, who was in turn the daughter of a Russian prince, Paulovic Chegodayef Sakonsky, and a Finnish sculptor, Johanna Kajanus. Norvind became estranged from her mother when she was 12; they were reunited to search for her unknown Dutch father on the Dutch program Spoorloos on 2 February 2004. Norvind has two daughters of her own: Naian and Tessa Ía González Norvind, the latter appearing at 17 years of age in her first film Después de Lucía, a 2012 Mexican film by Michel Franco.

Norvind began her acting career at the age of 6 in a theatre production of Henrik Ibsen's A Doll's House, and in television on the telenovela Chispita. Norvind's break came in at the age of 17 in 1987 with the role of Leonor Gutiérrez on the El Canal de las Estrellas telenovela Quinceañera. The same year, she participated in the film Gaby: A True Story. After a few small roles in several other telenovelas, she starred in Cuando llega el amor and then took a break from television. She returned eight years later in the telenovela Preciosa. She also appeared as herself in Didn't Do It for Love, a documentary about her mother directed by Monika Treut.

In 2006, Norvind completed the film that her mother had been directing and producing at the time of her death in May of that same year, titled Born Without, a documentary about severely handicapped Mexican actor and musician Jose Flores, who was born without arms and other limbs, yet supports his large family by playing the harmonica at various venues throughout Mexico.

Norvind is openly bisexual.

== Filmography ==
=== Film ===
Year	Title	Role	Notes
1978	The Bermuda Triangle	Diabolical Doll	
1987	Gaby: A True Story	Terry	
2011	La otra familia	Nina Cabrera	Nominated - Ariel Award for Best Supporting Actress
2012	Después de Lucía	Insurance Representant	
2014	The Incident	Sandra	
2015	Chronic	Laura	
2020	El club de los idealistas	Abigail	Nominated - Ariel Award for Best Supporting Actress
2022	Robe of Gems	Isabel	

=== Television ===
Year	Title	Role	Notes
1983	Chispita	Sarita	
1984	Guadalupe	Nani	Supporting role
1985–87	Cachún cachún ra ra!	Aïda	Supporting role
1986	Pobre juventud	Gaby	Supporting role
1987	Quinceañera	Leonor	
1988	Encadenados	Mariela	Supporting role
1989	Lo blanco y lo negro	Selma Alcázar	Supporting role
1990	Cuando llega el amor	Alejandra Contreras	
1998	Derbez en cuando	Teresa "Teresita"	Episode: "Telenovela Mari"
1998	Preciosa	Valeria San Román de Santander	
1999	Amor gitano	Isa Valenti, Marquise of Astolfi	
2000–01	Abrázame muy fuerte	Déborah Falcón de Rivero	
2001	Mujer, casos de la vida real	Elena	2 episodes
2001	Amigas y rivales	Paula	Supporting role
2004	Mujer de madera	Viviana Palomares	
2004–06	Rebelde	Marina Carceres Colucci	Supporting role
2008	Mujeres asesinas	Martha	"Martha, asfixiante" (Season 1, Episode 5)
2008–09	Cuidado con el ángel	Viviana Mayer Montenegro de San Román	
2009	Hermanos y detectives		"Diez minutos antes de morir " (Season 1, Episode 8)
2010	Capadocia	Diane Brighton	Episodes "Lo que une dios", "Cordero de dios", "Aparta de mí éste cáliz"
2010–11	Para volver a amar	Valeria Andrade	
2011	Como dice el dicho	Sandra	"Dime de qué presumes" (Season 1, Episode 36)
2012	Abismo de pasión	Begoña Narvaez de Tovar	Supporting role
2013–18	Sr. Ávila	María Ávila	
2014	Crónica de Castas	Elena	Episodes "De criolla con mestizo" and "El zapoteco"
2014–15	Muchacha italiana viene a casarse	Federica Ángeles	
2016–17	La candidata	Teresa Rivera	
2019	Cuna de lobos	Ámbar Reyes	
2022	Vencer la ausencia	Flavia Vilchis	
2025	Los hilos del pasado	Rebeca de la Cruz de Fontaine	Supporting role
2026	Top Chef VIP	Herself	Contestant (season 5)
