= Parallel (2018 film) =

2018 Canadian film

- Directed by: Isaac Ezban
- Written by: Scott Blaszak
- Produced by: Garrick Dion; Matthias Mellinghaus
- Starring: Aml Ameen; Martin Wallström; Georgia King; Mark O'Brien; Alyssa Diaz
- Cinematography: Karim Hussain
- Edited by: Ben Baudhuin
- Music by: Edy Lan
- Production company: Bron Studios
- Distributed by: Vertical Entertainment
- Release date: April 10, 2018 (Brussels)
- Running time: 104 minutes
- Country: Canada
- Language: English

Parallel is a 2018 Canadian science fiction thriller film. The film stars Aml Ameen, Martin Wallström, Georgia King, Mark O'Brien and Alyssa Diaz.

== Plot ==
An elderly woman leaves her husband in bed to feed their dog, and is silently killed by an intruder, who removes her mask to reveal she is an exact duplicate of the wife. She "returns" to bed.

Software developer friends Devin, Noel, Leena, and Josh are given an impossible deadline by their investors to finish their app. They realise rival programmer Seth has betrayed them. Drowning their sorrows, they learn from barmaid Carmen their home is supposedly haunted, the previous occupant having mysteriously disappeared.

Back home they discover a hidden room with a mirror that acts as a portal. Josh steps through and returns seconds later saying he had been in a parallel world for 15 minutes. They use the mirror to slow down time and complete the app.

Leena finds the diaries of the missing woman, Marissa, revealing she used the mirror to reconnect with her husband, who was still alive in another universe. Devin reviews publicity about his father who died by suicide after a corruption scandal.

Josh uses the mirror to seduce women, Leena to copy works of art and sell them as her own, Noel to copy and market technology. They rapidly become successful and wealthy. After Seth insults Devin's father, Noel takes Devin through the mirror where they enter "alt" Seth's house. Noel destroys Seth's property and beats up Seth, inviting Devin to participate. Devin refuses, protesting that Seth is a real person. "Is he?" Noel responds.

Josh takes Devin to a world where Josh beds Carmen. Devin fails to hear Carmen's boyfriend returning, who shoots Josh. Devin carries Josh back to their world where he dies. In panic, the others agree with Noel to replace Josh with one kidnapped from another world.

The alternative Josh is drugged, and wakes to find his three friends packing. They convince him that he got so drunk he doesn't remember getting hired for his dream job (engineered by Noel).

Devin and Leena sleep together before Devin disappears, apparently in search of his father. Noel tells Leena it is typical Devin and he will be back in a few weeks. Leena sees Noel put Devin's phone in the trash. She recovers it and tracks Devin to a lakeside cabin. He says Noel told him to hide until a lawsuit Seth has launched is over. As he has no recollection of sleeping with Leena, she realises Noel has killed the original Devin and imported an alt. She leaves him with Devin's phone.

Alt Josh, increasingly desperate that details of the world do not match his memories, pulls a gun on Noel and badly wounds him. An alt Noel steps through the mirror and shoots Noel and Josh. He tells Leena he has always loved her, showing her evidence of the many alternate Leena he has met. He chases Leena to the attic where alt Devin shoots Noel, who jumps into the mirror. Leena tells Devin they must run, as Noel will come back. Just as Noel steps back through Leena closes the mirror, slicing Noel in half.

Devin and Leena embrace and dispose of the body. Leena smashes the mirror and they leave to start a new life. Leena is in a gas station restroom when there is a flash in the mirror. The Leena that joins Devin in the car is unaware of the music they had just been listening to.

== Cast ==
- Aml Ameen as Devin
- Martin Wallström as Noel
- Georgia King as Leena
- Mark O'Brien as Josh
- Alyssa Diaz as Carmen
- Kathleen Quinlan as Marissa
- David Harewood as Devin's father
- Shannon Chan-Kent as Jessica

== Release ==
It premiered at the 2018 Brussels International Fantastic Film Festival.

== Accolades ==
Award nominations
Award	Category	Nominee(s)	Result
2019 Leo Awards	Best Sound in a Motion Picture	Bill Mellow, Jay Cheetham, Daniel Cardona, Kelly Cole, Shane Shemko, Elaine Stef, James Wallace	Nominated
2019 Leo Awards	Best Visual Effects in a Motion Picture	Barbara Jansen, Maxime Hacquin, Adele Jones, Vladimir Sofronov, Robert Habros	Nominated
