= The Incident (2014 film) =

2014 Mexican science fiction thriller film

- Film poster
- Spanish: El Incidente
- Directed by: Isaac Ezban
- Written by: Isaac Ezban
- Produced by: Salomon Askenazi; Miriam Mercado; Isaac Ezban
- Cinematography: Rodrigo Sandoval Vega Gil
- Edited by: Salomon Askenazi
- Music by: Edy Lan
- Distributed by: Cine Canibal
- Release dates: September 2014 (Fantastic Fest); 11 September 2015 (Mexico)
- Running time: 101 minutes
- Country: Mexico
- Language: Spanish

The Incident (Spanish: El Incidente) is a 2014 Mexican science fiction thriller film written and directed by Isaac Ezban. It stars an ensemble cast including Raúl Méndez, Nailea Norvind, Hernán Mendoza, Humberto Busto, Fernando Alvarez Rebeil, Gabriel Santoyo, Paulina Montemayor, Hector Mendoza, Leonel Tinajero, and Marcos Moreno.

After tragedy strikes, two different groups of people find themselves stuck in their current location, unable to escape from an infinitely repeating road and an endless staircase, respectively. The film premiered at the Fantastic Fest and was released in Mexico on 11 September 2015.

== Plot ==
Small-time criminal Carlos comes home to find his younger brother, Oliver, agitated. Before Oliver can explain his behavior, rogue cop Marco emerges from hiding and places both brothers under arrest. Oliver explains that he has confessed under duress and begs forgiveness. Carlos demands to see a warrant. Marco admits he does not have one and attempts to take them to the police station at gunpoint.

The brothers overpower Marco and flee down their apartment complex's stairwell. While chasing them, Marco shoots Carlos in the leg but seems surprised by his own action. They are then startled by a loud explosion in the distance just before they realize that the stairs turn out to be endless, looping in on themselves. As Marco goes through the items in his wallet, he finds a miniature playing card he does not recognize. He tears the tiny card into pieces and does not pay it any further attention. Oliver applies first aid to his brother but can only watch as Carlos bleeds to death the next day.

Before he dies, Carlos urges Oliver to appreciate the present, something he could never do. As Oliver mourns Carlos' death, Marco becomes shaken when he sees that a vending machine on the stairwell has become restocked, precisely as it was 24 hours ago. Enraged by Marco's callousness, Oliver disarms him and threatens to kill him with his pistol. Marco insists that he did not consciously choose to shoot Carlos and the two argue over the metaphysics of their situation.

Elsewhere, Sandra and her two children, Daniel and Camila, prepare to visit her ex-husband. Although her new husband, Roberto, is anxious about the trip, Sandra reassures him the long drive will give him a chance to bond with her children. Daniel packs a deck of miniature playing cards, just like the one Marco found in his wallet. On the way, they stop at a gas station where Roberto carelessly offers fruit juice to Camila, who has an allergic reaction to it and slowly starts having an asthma attack. Roberto finds a piece of green bamboo in his car, which he finds puzzling. He tosses the bamboo onto the road without paying any further attention.

After Roberto accidentally destroys her inhaler—an accident he insists was fated to happen—a loud explosion sounds in the distance. Sandra asks Daniel to retrieve the backup inhaler, but he reveals that he forgot to pack it. Panicking, Sandra insists that Roberto turn around and return home. After repeatedly passing the same gas station, they realize the road endlessly repeats the same stretch.

Roberto exits the car and walks off through the brush to seek help. Without access to her inhaler, Camila dies. Believing herself stuck in a nightmare, Sandra abandons her children and drives off, vainly attempting to wake herself. Daniel picks up his sister's body and begins walking down the road in the opposite direction. They all converge to the same spot and give up hope of escape.

Thirty-five years later, both groups are still stuck in their respective locations. Each day, everyone finds a fresh copy of all their possessions. Over the decades, these items gather into towering piles as the two groups attempt to live their repetitive lives. Sandra and Roberto, now elderly, have animalistic sex while Daniel lives independently without much interaction with them. Oliver keeps fit through regular exercise in the stairwell and leads the elderly Marco in rituals worshiping Carlos' skeleton.

After Sandra dies, Roberto and Daniel hold a funeral where Roberto is struck by a moment of lucidity as he, too, nears death. He says he now understands why they are stuck. The elderly Roberto and Marco reveal to the younger Daniel and Oliver, respectively, that none of this is real, but rather an alternate dimension to their real lives. Roberto explains that when he was a 10-year-old boy, he was in another incident stuck on a raft (made of green bamboo) for thirty-five years. At the same time, the elderly Marco explains that he is really Daniel, the 10-year-old boy from the incident of the infinite road, thus explaining the cycle of incidents and new dimensions.

These alternate dimensions split off from reality and form a time loop. They are brought on by tragedy, and their inhabitants' emotions are fed back into their real-world personas. The younger person stuck in an incident fares better than the older person, so younger people in real life have more happiness and fortune than older people who experience more sadness and misfortune. We see glimpses of the characters' real lives, taking positive and negative turns.

As he dies, Roberto urges young Daniel to break the cycle of creating new dimensions by refusing to follow his fate. Similarly, the elderly Marco/Daniel urges the younger Oliver to break the cycle as well. While both Daniel and Oliver initially hesitate, they end up following their fate against the advice they received. Daniel enters a police car and becomes Marco, off to arrest Oliver and Carlos. Oliver leaves his apartment complex and becomes the Russian bellhop Karl who operates an elevator for two newlyweds. He sets in motion an accidental death for the groom, trapping himself and the bride in a new dimension for thirty-five years.

== Cast ==
- Raúl Méndez as Marco and adult Daniel
- Nailea Norvind as Sandra
- Hernán Mendoza as Roberto
- Humberto Busto as Carlos
- Fernando Alvarez Rebeil as Oliver
- Gabriel Santoyo as Daniel
- Paulina Montemayor as Camila
- Hector Mendoza as adult Oliver
- Leonel Tinajero as old Marco
- Marcos Moreno as old Roberto
- Luciana Villegas as bride
- Adrián Ladrón de Guevara as groom
- Leticia Gonzalez as old Sandra
- Magda Brugengheim as old bride
- Santiago Mendoza Cortes as young Roberto
- Erick Trinidad Camacho as Juan

== Release ==
An incomplete version of the film screened at the 2014 Cannes Film Festival. The Incident subsequently premiered at the Fantastic Fest in September 2014. Cine Canibal distributed it in Mexico, and Shoreline Entertainment picked up the film for international distribution. It was released in Mexico on 11 September 2015.

== Reception ==
Rotten Tomatoes, a review aggregator, reports that 83% of 18 surveyed critics gave the film a positive review; the average rating is 6/10. Catherine Bray of Variety wrote that the film "largely succeeds" in telling a complex story on a limited budget, primarily due to the film's production design, but the overly-explanatory ending brings down the film.

Shawn Macomber of Fangoria rated it 3/4 stars and wrote that the film encourages viewers to consider their own lives, as the characters do.

Macomber also criticized the ending, writing that the film sometimes feels a bit forced in its storytelling, but said these are "minor quibbles". Writing for Screen Anarchy, Eric Ortiz Garcia called it "a great display of how to make an intriguing film with not many elements", referring to the limited sets.

== See also ==
- List of films featuring time loops
