= NNVAV =

Studio album by Zemmoa
- Released: 23 September 2016
- Recorded: 2015
- Genre: Electropop; Latin pop
- Length: 36 minutes
- Label: Zemmporio Records
- Producer: Juan Soto, Rafa Cuevas

Zemmoa chronology
Puro Desamor (2013)	NNVAV (2016)	Covers (2018)

Singles from Zemmoa Covers
- 1. "Hombre De Hojalata" Released: June 15, 2015; 2. "Ciencia Ficción" Released: July 12, 2016; 3. "+D10" Released: September 13, 2016

NNVAV is the second studio album by Mexican singer Zemmoa, released digitally and on vinyl on 15 June 2015.

== Background ==
In 2015 Zemmoa presented her second album NNVAV (Nothing is going to beat us) produced by Yamil Rezc (Julieta Venegas, Zoé, Hello Seahorse!), Juan Soto, Renato del Real and Andrés Jaime (Wet Baes).

Because in difficult times it is always better to think that nothing is going to beat us.

== Track listing ==
No.	Title	Length
1.	"Es Para Ti"	2:22
2.	"Ciencia Ficción"	3:36
3.	"+D10"	4:36
4.	"Hombre De Hojalata"	3:31
5.	"Biografía"	4:26
6.	"Sobrevivir"	4:11
7.	"El Alacrán"	3:25
8.	"Mujeryego"	4:31
9.	"NNVAV"	5:06

== Videos ==
- Hombre De Hojalata
- Ciencia Ficción
- +D10
