= Moving on Stereo =

Single by Pakito

from the album Video
- B-side: "Remix"
- Released: August 15, 2006
- Recorded: February 2006
- Genre: Trance, house, electro house
- Length: 3:28
- Label: ULM
- Songwriter(s): Julien Ranouil
- Producer(s): Julien Ranouil

Pakito singles chronology
"Living on Video" (2006)	"Moving on Stereo" (2006)	"Are U Ready?" (2007)

"Moving on Stereo" was the second single hit by French DJ Pakito, from his debut album Video. Released in August 2006, it followed "Living on Video", a number-one hit single in France, but was unable to duplicate the same huge sales and chartings, even if it met success in Poland, Finland, the Netherlands, and France where it reached the top ten. The song was written and the music composed by Julien Ranouil. The song contains a sample of "Guitar Spell" by DJ Sylvan from 1994.

== Versions ==
CD single

1. "Moving on Stereo" (original radio edit) — 3:10
2. "Moving on Stereo" (inside radio edit) — 3:12
3. "Moving on Stereo" (original mix) — 6:02
4. "Moving on Stereo" (inside mix) — 5:32

7" maxi

A-side:

1. "Moving on Stereo" (original mix) — 6:02

B-side:

1. "Moving on Stereo" (inside mix) — 5:32

Digital download

1. "Moving on Stereo" (original radio edit) — 3:10
2. "Moving on Stereo" (inside radio edit) — 3:12
3. "Moving on Stereo" (original mix) — 6:02
4. "Moving on Stereo" (inside mix) — 5:27

== Charts ==
=== Weekly charts ===
Chart (2006–07)	Peak position
Belgium (Ultratip Bubbling Under Flanders)	16
Belgium (Ultratop 50 Wallonia)	15
CIS Airplay (TopHit)	37
Finland (Suomen virallinen lista)	3
France (SNEP)	10
Netherlands (Dutch Top 40)	15
Netherlands (Single Top 100)	9
Russia Airplay (TopHit)	24
Sweden (Sverigetopplistan)	26

=== Year-end charts ===
Chart (2006)	Position
France (SNEP)	52
Chart (2007)	Position
CIS (Tophit)	57
Russia Airplay (TopHit)	48

=== Decade-end charts ===
Decade-end chart performance for "Moving on Stereo"
Chart (2000–2009)	Position
Russia Airplay (TopHit)	194
