= Two Plus Two (2022 film) =

- Theatrical release poster
- Directed by: Alfonso Pineda Ulloa
- Written by: Héctor Octavio Valdés Barrientos; Armando Gracia Medina; Patricio Saiz
- Produced by: Loipa Calviño Carbajal; Ricardo Coeto; Francisco Cordero; Carlos A. Corona; Ricardo Escobio; Juan Pablo Polo; Ivonne Vela; Laura Veytia
- Starring: Arath de la Torre; Adriana Louvier; Luis Ernesto Franco; Tessa Ía
- Production companies: BTF Media; Star Original Productions
- Release date: March 31, 2022
- Running time: 103 minutes
- Country: Mexico
- Language: Spanish
- Box office: $369,145

Two Plus Two (Spanish: Dos más dos) is a 2022 Mexican sex comedy film directed by Alfonso Pineda Ulloa and written by Héctor Octavio Valdés Barrientos, Armando Gracia Medina & Patricio Saiz. Starring Arath de la Torre, Adriana Louvier, Luis Ernesto Franco and Tessa Ía. It is a remake of the 2012 Argentine film 2+2. It premiered on March 31, 2022, in Mexican theaters.

== Synopsis ==
The marriage between Enrique and Sara is becoming monotonous due to the lack of affection. To try to save their marriage, they decide to practice polygamy and partner exchange, without imagining that everything will get worse.

== Cast ==
The actors participating in this film are:

- Arath de la Torre as Enrique
- Adriana Louvier as Sara
- Luis Ernesto Franco as Ricardo
- Tessa Ía as Lucy
- Claudio Lafarga as Carlos
- Martha Claudia Moreno as Vanessa
- Juan Carlos Remolina as Pablo Martell
- Florencia Benitez as Francisca
- Daniel Haddad as Hugo
- Adriana Montes de Oca as Kathia
- Mairen Muñoz as Elvira
- Artús Chávez as César
- Brenda De Arrigunaga as Mónica
- Patricio Zamora as Lucas
