= El Muertho de Tijuana =

Mexican singer songwriter

- Also known as: San Balthazar, El Muertho TJ
- Born: Jesús Hernández Ramos; January 1, 1966 (age 60); Delicias, Chihuahua, Mexico
- Origin: Tijuana, Baja California, Mexico
- Genre: Mexican rock
- Occupations: Musician, singer-songwriter, street performer
- Instruments: Vocals, guitar, keyboards
- Years active: 2013–present
- Labels: Dos Tonos, Lost Causes

El Muertho de Tijuana born Jesús Hernández Ramos, is a Mexican musical artist, singer, songwriter, and street performer from Delicias, Chihuahua. His first album was produced by Alejandro Rosso from Plastilina Mosh

== Early life ==
Jesús played guitar at a christian evangelical church. Ramos played professional soccer and reached the reserve team of Tigres (Universidad Autónoma de Nuevo León), then he worked in auto body repair. Ramos was a street performer fire eater. In 2012, he was diagnosed with cancer, lost his job, bought a keyboard and asked for help.

== Career ==
El Muertho de Tijuana first attracted attention as a street musician performing original songs in public spaces, tianguis, throughout Tijuana.

He rose to fame through appearances in films and documentaries such as Ricardo Silva’s Navajazo (2014) and Carlos Reygadas’s Nuestro Tiempo.

== Discography ==
=== Studio albums ===
- Padre Santo (2015)
- Kálmathe Satanás (2019)
- Una Canción Pa'l Corazón (2023)
- El Monje Mamón (2026)

=== Selected singles ===
- "Ave de las Tempestades"
- "Crisstho Ha Regresado"
- "De Rodillas Perro (Canción Bi-Sexual)"
- "Drogadicción"
- "El Brujo del Rock"
- "El Harem de la Mujer"
- "El Muertho se te Sube"
- "Malandro"
- "Maldita Diabetes"
- "Me Suicidaré"
- "Me Voy a Chacalear"
- "Rock para Satán"
- "Satánica"
- "Tenerla Adentro"
- "Vampiro Gay"
- "Vestimenta de Buscona"
- "Viejo Decrépito"

=== Featured appearances ===
- "Halloween" featuring Xiu Xiu (2015)
- "Tiempo de Perdonar" featuring Zemmoa (2016)
- "Prolapso" featuring VPR (2021)
- "Sueños Falsos" (2022) featuring Obreros De La Musica (El Teacher Del Rock)
- "Vivo en el Panteón" (2025) featuring Voz Espectro
- "Sin Regreso" (2025) featuring Bahena
