= Querido Corazón =

Single by Zemmoa
- Language: Spanish
- Released: June 3, 2022
- Recorded: 2022
- Genre: Electropop; Latin pop
- Label: Zemmporio Records
- Songwriters: Zemmoa, Alfredo Cabello
- Producer: Alfredo Cabello

Zemmoa singles chronology
"Como La Primera Vez" (2021)	"Querido Corazón" (2022)	"Sígueme" (2022)

"Querido Corazón" is an electropop song co-written by Zemmoa and Alfredo Cabello. Produced by Alfredo Cabello Soto.

== Music video ==
The music video shows Zemmoa dancing alone in an empty discoteque.

== Appearances ==
Zemmoa presents her new Concert tour "Lo que tour me haces sentir" at Foro Indie Rocks with Noa Sainz, La Bruja de Texcoco, Manu Nna (comedy), Mancandy (singer), hosted by Amelia Waldorf (drag queen).

== Release ==
During LGBT Pride Month, she announced new single "Querido corazón" on a Proust Questionnaire.

== Credits and personnel ==
- Zemmoa and Alfredo Cabello – Songwriters
- Alfredo Cabello, Ben Daval (Los Master Plus) – record producer
- Arturo "Tibu" Santillanes – saxophone
- Leonardo Villegas – violin
- Noa Sainz and Alfredo Cabello – backing vocalists
- Oscar Amato and Noa Sainz – audio engineers
- Alberto Hernández – remix
- Cem Oral – mastering (audio)
- Juan Retallack – album cover
- Francisco Tostado – graphic design
- Lucía Anaya (aka Uchi o Derre Tidá) – talent management
- Altafonte – record distribution
- Maria Ponce – fashion designer
- Emilio Bianchic Generación Galáctica – Film director
