= The Similars =

- Los parecidos
- Directed by: Isaac Ezban
- Written by: Isaac Ezban
- Produced by: Elsa Reyes; Miriam Mercado; Isaac Ezban
- Starring: Gustavo Sánchez Parra; Cassandra Ciangherotti; Fernando Becerril; Humberto Busto; Carmen Beato; Santiago Torres; Maria Elena Olivares
- Cinematography: Isi Sarfati
- Edited by: Oscar Figueroa
- Music by: Edy Lan
- Production companies: Yellow Films; Zensky Cine
- Release date: September 2015 (Fantastic Fest)
- Running time: 90 minutes
- Country: Mexico
- Language: Spanish

The Similars (Spanish: Los parecidos) is a 2015 Mexican supernatural thriller film written and directed by Isaac Ezban. It stars Gustavo Sánchez Parra, Cassandra Ciangherotti, Fernando Becerril, Humberto Busto, Carmen Beato, Santiago Torres, and María Elena Olivares as people who are trapped by a hurricane at a bus station around the time of the Tlatelolco massacre in 1968. As the passengers wait for a bus to arrive, they are horrified to find that everyone's face is slowly transforming. The Similars premiered at Fantastic Fest in September 2015. It was released in Mexico in October 2016.

== Plot ==
Ulises becomes frustrated when he is stuck in a bus depot during a massive storm while his wife gives birth in nearby Mexico City. Intermittent broadcasts on Martin's radio report increasingly worse news, eventually revealing that the storm is suspected to be a worldwide phenomenon of unknown origin. Ulises attempts to call the hospital with the station's payphone, only to be disconnected. Ulises asks to use the phone of the elderly clerk, Martin, but Martin says he does not have an outside line.

Irene, a pregnant woman, takes shelter in the bus station. Ulises suggests she try to call for a taxi with the payphone. When she reports it is on the way, Ulises excitedly offers to share the fare. While they wait for the taxi, Irene goes to the restroom, where a cleaning woman, Rosa, insists that she stay. While Irene attempts to flee Rosa, Rosa has a seizure.

Three more people arrive at the station: Alvaro, Gertrudis, and Gertrudis's son, Ignacio. Hearing Irene's calls for help, the others assist her. Martin, his face covered in bandages, comes out of his office with a rifle and blames everything on Ulises. Confused, Ulises says he is just a miner who is worried about his wife. An older woman there, Roberta, has the same epileptic seizure as Rosa. The group disarms and ties up Martin. Alvaro, a medical student, becomes concerned when he sees Gertrudis inject Ignacio with a hypodermic needle. She insists Ignacio needs regular doses to remain calm.

Alvaro recognizes Ignacio as a famous unsolved medical case. All are stunned when Martin reveals that his face has morphed to look exactly like Ulises. Roberta, too, begins to show signs of facial hair similar to Ulises. Alvaro accuses Ulises of being a government agent. They become panicked when Irene also transforms. Alvaro attempts to leave the station, only to find the doors are locked and bulletproof.

Alvaro and Irene investigate Martin's office. They find that all the photographs, statues, and posters now have Ulises's face. Ignacio locks Gertrudis and Martin in a back room, where Rosa has transformed and committed suicide. Ignacio shows Ulises a comic book about aliens who steal humanity's individuality. Once everyone has transformed, humanity's memory is wiped, and humans once again perceive themselves as individuals, not knowing they have lost their individuality. When Gertrudis escapes, she explains that Ignacio has caused the comic book to come true.

Ignacio reveals he was preventing them from leaving. When the others confront him, Ignacio uses his ability to change reality to stop them. As Ulises dies, he claims to not recognize the others' faces. In his wallet, they find a picture of Ulises, who doesn't look like the bearded clone everyone else has transformed into; they surmise he was the first to transform. Irene dies during childbirth, and her baby has the cloned face. Ignacio collapses, and Roberta examines him. She says he made contact with the aliens and, not believing them to be real, mistakenly allowed them to control him.

The police arrive and arrest Alvaro, blaming him for the deaths. Gertrudis and Ignacio leave for Tlatelolco, Mexico City. Narration announces that with few exceptions, Ignacio is the only one to remember or know what has happened, much like the comic book.

== Cast ==
- Gustavo Sánchez Parra as Ulises
- Cassandra Ciangherotti as Irene
- Fernando Becerril as Martin
- Humberto Busto as Alvaro
- Carmen Beato as Gertrudis
- Santiago Torres as Ignacio
- Maria Elena Olivares as Roberta
- Catalina Salas as Rosa

== Production ==
Writer-director Isaac Ezban was influenced by The Twilight Zone. Like that show, he said he wanted to make a thriller that focused primarily on the characters. Ezban wrote the script in 2011, and shooting began on 7 July 2014 in Mexico City and Puebla. Ezban considered shooting in black and white but instead used desaturated colors. Besides The Twilight Zone, Ezban was inspired by The Box, which he said looks otherworldly because of its desaturated colors. The film is not overly political, but Ezban wanted to include references to the Tlatelolco massacre as a plot point to homage the socially conscious films of the 1960s while giving it a uniquely Mexican flavor.

== Release ==
The Similars premiered at Fantastic Fest in September 2015. It was released in Mexico in October 2016.

== Reception ==
Rotten Tomatoes, a review aggregator, reports that 95% of 19 surveyed critics gave the film a positive review; the average rating is 7.2/10. Dennis Harvey of Variety compared it to the 1961 Twilight Zone episode It's a Good Life, calling it "disappointingly familiar" but a "canny homage". Kim Newman of Screen Daily wrote, "Funny, suspenseful, inventive and charming, this knows when to tone down the homage and become genuinely frightening". Madeleine Koestner of Fangoria rated it 3/4 stars and wrote that the film "sells its silliness as scary, and by the end, you believe this ridiculous occurrence is really terrifying".
