= Covers (Zemmoa album) =

Studio album by Zemmoa
- Released: 15 June 2018
- Genres: Electropop; Latin pop
- Length: 56 minutes
- Label: Zemmporio Records
- Producers: Maurizio Terracina, Andrés Jaime (Wet Baes), Rafa Cuevas

Zemmoa chronology
NNVAV (2016)	Covers (2018)	Lo Que Me Haces Sentir (2021)

Singles from Zemmoa Covers
- 1. "No Pensar en Ti" Released: June 15, 2018; 2. "Ni Tú Ni Nadie" Released: July 12, 2018; 3. "Qué Hice para Merecer Esto? What Have I Done to Deserve This" Released: September 13, 2018; 4. "Obsesión" Released: February 14, 2019

Covers is the third studio album by Mexican singer Zemmoa, released digitally and on vinyl on 15 June 2018.

== Background ==
The album was produced in 2018. Zemmoa commented in an interview that the idea of the new album began by outlining the soundtrack of a film based on the Poison Ivy (song), and added: "Instead of marketing to what is going to work, I was thinking in the songs that have marked my history all my life. These are songs that describe me or that I am very much myself ". The album cover is a tribute-reinterpretation of the album Superman, by Barbra Streisand. Producers such as Maurizio Terracina (Café Tacvba, Ely Guerra, Jumbo, and Zurdok), Andrés Jaime (Wet Baes), Rafa Cuevas, among others, participated in the making of this album.

== Appearances ==
In 2018, Zemmoa presented her album Zemmoa Covers which is a tribute and thanks to various artists. The album was presented live in the Zócalo during the closing of the 40th edition of the march to celebrate Gay pride on June 23, where about 250 thousand Mexicans attended on their tour of the Paseo de la Reforma to the Zócalo. Also in the Centro Cultural de España, the festival took place in the Carpa Astros on Calzada de Tlalpan where Fey (singer), Lis Vega and Belinda were also present.

Zemmoa performed her album Covers at International Chicago Underground Queer Transcendance Symposium (ICUQTS) in collaboration with TrQpiteca in 2018.

She featured in the Noé Santillán-López album Veintañera, divorciada y fantástica with the song «Mucha mujer para ti», where she also appears as herself interpreting it.

She contributed to the album Querido tributo indie al divo, a musical tribute in honor of Juan Gabriel with the song "Para no olvidar".

In that year, "La Carrera Drag de la CDMX", a drag contest, made an episode dedicated to Zemmoa.

She inspired the Detroit gothic industrial rock band Ritual Howls, who named one of her songs "Zemmoa" on their Turkish Leather album.

At the MTV Millennial Awards, Zemmoa sent a message to celebrate sexual diversity along with "La Divaza" (Pedro Luis Joao Figueira Álvarez), Victoria Volkóva and Los Jonas Vloggers.

In that year, she also appeared in magazines such as Chilango (magazine) and Paper (magazine). She participated in the Gael García Bernal series, Here on Earth (TV series) (2018).

In 2019, Zemmoa Covers was presented at the Sor Juana Festival of the National Museum of Mexican Art and the festival of cultural diversity and social justice «Pilsen Fest» in Chicago together with Reyna Tropical.

She wrote the article Confessions of Zemmoa for the magazine Rolling Stone Mexico, in which she recounted her experience of being a trans woman in Mexico, breaking the paradigm of machismo in national rock.

Crea, cree y haz que tu trabajo hable por ti misma.

— Zemmoa y Mancandy para Amazon (company) Music México

Zemmoa appeared in Hello Seahorse! new music video "Mujer" with MJ from Pussy Riot, Ale Moreno from Ruido Rosa, Tania Reza and the grandmother of the Mexican photographer Diego Moreno.

She shoot a TV Commercial for the advertising campaign #HOMEOFCLASSICS of Adidas Mexico.

"I am an artist in constant learning. When I was little it sounded the same as today. Inner tranquility, love, I believe that life is like that. Artists, poets, musicians, painters are always against our present. We managed to transcend, question, promote non-discrimination and self-love. There has to be a little rain for a rainbow to come out. We all have to learn to dance in the rain. And surely in the process we will dirty our sneakers. Simply Zemmoa."

— Zemmoa for Adidas Originals Home of Classics

She shoot a TV Commercial #NoSudesAvanza for the deodorant Secret with Paola "Wera" Kuri.

In 2020, she also participates in the advertising campaign Studio AW20 for H&M along with Bárbara López, Camila Valero, Darian Rojas, Fer Altuzar, Joaquín Bondoni, Nayeli de Alba, Rosshana Bracho and Victoria Volkóva.

Vice Media made a short documentary about "La Hora Trans" where she appears. Was an actress in the movie The Visit from Ana Mancera, Mexico (2019).

She has a collection of personal work that includes collages, oil paintings, watercolors, panels huicholas, installation, and she donated the collage work for the feminist collective exhibition U-tópicas, Mexico City, 2019.

In 2020, She offered a concert via streaming, sponsored by the Bumble social network, for whom she also recorded the advertising campaign for "Matchingones".

Zemmoa was part of the Spotify Pride 2020 and Deezer Pride Latino 2020 campaigns along with Georgel, Niña Dioz, Francisca Valenzuela and Valentina (RuPaul's Drag Race).

She inaugurated the sexual diversity film festivals «Gender Mix» at the Esperanza Iris City Theater and the International Festival for Sexual Diversity (FIDS) at the Museo Universitario del Chopo.

In 2020, she was interviewed by Alejandra Bogue and La Diva de Mexico for the radio comedy.

In 2020, Zemmoa performed at the OutMusik Festival, a livestreaming celebration of National Coming Out Day, featuring a list of performers that includes Vanessa Zamora, Georgel, Javiera Mena, Mabiland and Christian Chávez.

In alliance with the organization Impulse Group México, they create condoms with her image to promote the album Zemmoa Covers, in favor of prevention and awareness of sexually transmitted infections.

Zemmoa, SSION, Yolandeando Con Yolanda and Barbara Durango performed at the Fiesta Queens at the Foro Indie Rocks.

== Track listing ==
No.	Title	Length
1.	"El Gato y Yo" (Amanda Miguel)	4:57
2.	"Dos Días en la Vida" (Celia Cruz)	4:23
3.	"Mucha Mujer para Ti featuring Alejandra Moreno Dulché from Ruído Rosa" (Bibi Gaytán)	3:41
4.	"Qué Hice para Merecer Esto? What Have I Done to Deserve This" (Pet Shop Boys)	3:49
5.	"No Pensar En Ti" (Raffaella Carrà)	3:55
6.	"Ahora te puedes marchar" (Luis Miguel)	4:27
7.	"Obsesión" (Miguel Mateos)	4:07
8.	"El blues del esclavo" (Mecano)	4:20
9.	"Vivir así es morir de amor" (Camilo Sesto)	3:31
10.	"Todo Lo Que Quiere Everything She Wants" (Wham!)	4:15
11.	"Canción para No Olvidar" (Juan Gabriel)	3:07
12.	"Y Qué?" (Cover de Babasónicos)	3:11
13.	"La Hiedra Venenosa featuring Rebel Cats" (Los Rebeldes del Rock)	3:24
14.	"Ni tú ni nadie" (Alaska y Dinarama)	3:19

== Videos ==
- No Pensar En Ti (Tribute to Ride a White Horse from Goldfrapp)
- Ni Tú Ni Nadie (Tribute to Life on Mars? from David Bowie)
- Qué Hice para Merecer Esto (Tribute to Rock with You from Michael Jackson)
- Obsesión (Tribute to Lo Haré Por Ti from Paulina Rubio)
