= Living on Video (1983 album) =

Studio album by Trans-X
- Released: October 20, 1983
- Recorded: March–September 1983
- Studio: Ultrasonic Studio, Montreal
- Length: 40:46
- Language: English, French
- Label: Polydor
- Producer: Daniel Bernier

Trans-X chronology
Living on Video (1983)	Living on Video (1986)

Professional ratings
Review scores
Source	Rating
Allmusic	4/5 stars

Living on Video (also known as Message on the Radio) is the first studio album by the Canadian synth-pop group Trans-X. Recorded and released in 1983 by Mantra Records, Message on the Radio was a seven-track album. Produced by Daniel Bernier, the record featured all instruments played by Pascal Languirand with Anne Brosseau on supporting vocals. The album was reissued in 1993 and contains a total of 14 tracks.

== Track listing ==
Side A
No.	Title	Writer(s)	Length
1.	"3-D Dance"	Daniel Bernier, Dominique Nicodemo, Pascal Languirand	5:52
2.	"Nitelife"	Pascal Languirand	7:09
3.	"21st Century"	Pascal Languirand	5:25

Side B
No.	Title	Writer(s)	Length
4.	"Living on Video"	Pascal Languirand	5:55
5.	"Message on the Radio"	Pascal Languirand	5:10
6.	"Josee"	Lise Gregoire, Pascal Languirand	5:45
7.	"Digital World"	Steve Wyatt, Pascal Languirand	3:30

=== 1993 CD reissue ===
No.	Title	Writer(s)	Length
1.	"Living on Video"	Pascal Languirand	5:54
2.	"Message on the Radio"	P. Languirand	5:10
3.	"Nitelife"	P. Languirand	7:10
4.	"21st Century"	P. Languirand	5:24
5.	"Josee"	Lise Grégoire, Pascal Languirand	5:42
6.	"Digital World (Pascal Languirand, S. Wyatt)"	S. Wyatt, P. Languirand	3:30
7.	"Eyes of Desire"	René Grignon, Pascal Languirand	3:32
8.	"3D-Dance"	Daniel Bernier, Dominique Nicodemo, Pascal Languirand	5:41
9.	"Monkey Dance"	F. Weber, D. Toupin, P. Languirand	5:45
10.	"Through the Eyes of the 90's"	D. Toupin, P. Morin, J. Therrien, F. Weber, S. Daviau, P. Languirand	5:05
11.	"Ich Liebe Dich (I Love You)"	D. Toupin, P. Morin, J. Therrien, F. Weber, S. Daviau, P. Languirand	5:25
12.	"Living on Video (Re-Recorded)"	Pascal Languirand	7:04
13.	"Message on the Radio (Remix)"	P. Languirand	5:27
14.	"Vivre Sur Video"	P. Languirand	6:12

== Personnel ==
Musicians

- Pascal Languirand - lead vocals, performer
- Pierre Lacoste - percussion ("Living on Video", "Message on the Radio")
- Pierre Lacoste - drums ("Josee")
- Guy Abrassart - guitar ("Message on the Radio", "Josee")
- Steve Wyatt - synthesizer ("Digital World")
- René Grignon - synthesizer ("Eyes of desire")
- Laurie Ann Gill - female voice

Additional personnel

- Daniel Bernier - producer
- Carmine Nicodemo, Dominique Nicodemo - executive producer
- Pierre Bernard - synthesizer programming
- Claude Allard - mixing, engineer
- Gaetan Desbiens - recorded by
- Christian Traut - artwork by
- Anne Brosseau, Chiffon, Ian Lebofsky, Linda Benoy, Liz Tansey - additional personnel
- Carole Arsenaul - hair
- Lisa Fizzano - makeup
- Daniel Poulin - photography

Instruments: Roland Jupiter-4 and 6, CSQ 600 and TR-808, Korg Vocoder and Polysix, Oberheim OB-8, DMX and DSX, Elka Synthex, electric guitar, Simmons and Mattel drums.
