= Zemmoa =

Mexican singer songwriter-woman and actress

Zemmoa Becerril Silva
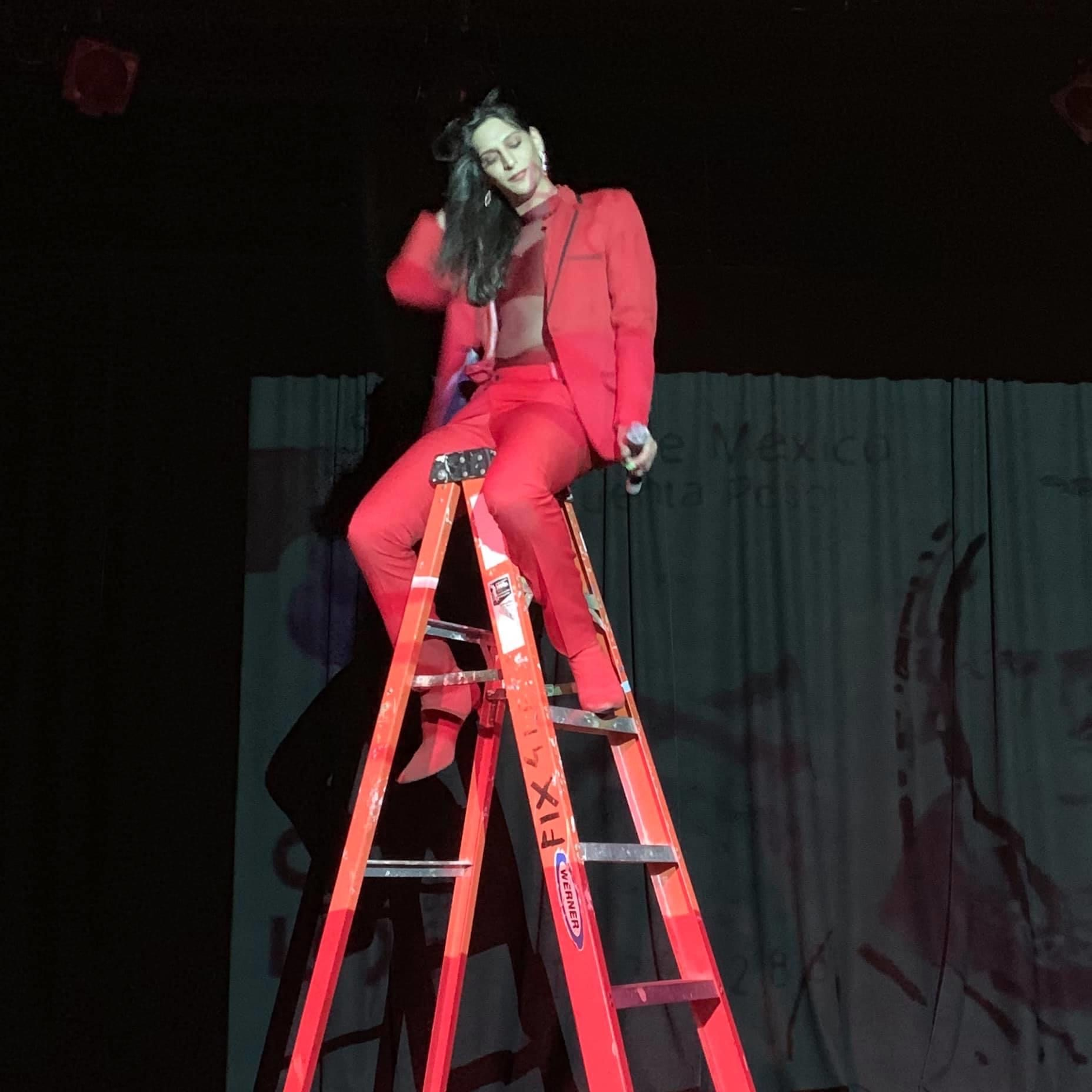
- Zemmoa at the National Museum of Mexican Art, Chicago in 2018.

Background information
- Born: October 3, 1986 (age 39); Cuernavaca, Morelos, Mexico
- Origin: Mexico City, Mexico
- Genres: Electropop; latin pop; alternative rock; glam rock; Synth-pop
- Occupations: Singer-songwriter, actress
- Instruments: Vocals; keytar; piano
- Years active: 2005–present
- Label: Universal Music Group Mexico

Zemmoa Becerril Silva is a Mexican singer-songwriter and actress. She is known for her song Mi Amor Soy Yo featuring Tessa Ía and Trans-X that went viral on Spotify in 2021.

== Life and career ==
=== 1986–2005: Early life ===
She is the daughter of Rodolfo Becerril Straffon. Her father was a Mexican politician and professor at the Polytechnic University of the State of Morelos. Zemmoa's stage name derives from the French "C'est moi" which means "it's me". She had her musical debut during Paris Hilton's first visit to Mexico City in 2005.

She grew up surrounded by classical music. Her grandmother was a piano teacher at the Conservatorio Nacional de Música (Mexico); her grandfather, Jesús Silva, was a guitarist, a colleague of maestro Andrés Segovia and with a scholarship named in her honor at Virginia Commonwealth University in the United States. Zemmoa mentioned other transgender artists such as Honey Dijon and Wendy Carlos as her influences when she started in music as a self-taught person.

=== 2006–2012: Career beginnings ===
In 2006, her song "Fashion Victims", which samples Shake Your Groove Thing, was part of the soundtrack of Así del precipicio directed by Teresa Suárez. In that year she was the opening act for Peaches (musician), Technotronic, and Erasure.

In 2008, Zemmoa hosted the Latin Grammy Awards party in New York. In 2009, she made the "Born To Tour" tour of Mexico as well as in Paris, Berlin, Barcelona, Madrid, Brussels, Vienna, New York, Chicago, Los Angeles, and Bogotá. In 2010, she released her first video with Zemmporio Records titled "Zeuz". In 2012, she made a cameo appearance in Julieta Venegas' music video "Tuve Para Dar".

She has been a model for fashion designers such as for Calvin Klein Mexico, Marvin Durán, Quetzalcóatl Rangel, ManCandy, Carlos Temores, Denis Marcheboud, and the Peruvian photographer Mario Testino.

She was also the Bouncer (doorman) of the MN Roy club, which was the home of Manabendra Nath Roy, one of the founders of the Mexican Communist Party.

In 2012, she launched the calendar Z01Z, a limited edition calendar (1,000 copies) whose photographs were taken by 15 renowned international artists of contemporary Mexican art, such as Gregory Allen, Yvonne Venegas, Napoleón Habéica, Emilio Valdés, Miguel Calderón, Mauricio Limón, among others, sponsored by Vice México and Cine Tonalá.

=== 2023: Universal Music and Warner Chappell Music ===
Zemmoa leaves her stage as an independent artist behind and signs a contract with Universal Music Mexico as her record label and Warner Chappell Music Mexico as her publisher.

== Activism ==
She participated in conferences for the Women's Weekend forum at the Mercedes-Benz Fashion Week Mexico at the St. Regis Hotels & Resorts, Mexico City.

In 2019, she was the first 100 percent Mexican advertising campaign that P&G presented at the Global Citizen Forum at the 73 General Assembly of the United Nations (UN) as an official spokesperson for the rights of the population LGBT.

In 2022, Zemmoa was interviewed by "El Once", "Sistema Público de Radiodifusión del Estado Mexicano (SPR)" and the "Instituto Nacional de las Mujeres (INMUJERES)", for their project "Yo, ellas, nosotras", a digital production in the format of Draw My Life among other transgender women: Láurel Miranda (journalist), Amelia Waldorf (drag queen), Natalia Lane (sex worker), Mickey Cundapí (content creator), Eliza Sonrisas (comedian), Samantha Flores (activist), Alejandra Bogue y Salma Luévano. During the 20-meter flag signing, at the International Transgender Day of Visibility held at the foot of the Monumento a la Revolución, Zemmoa with Kenya Cuevas and Lepaline, gathered over 20 thousand signatures from people around the world showing their solidarity with the transgender community in Mexico City.

Zemmoa participated on the music video "Mujeres Ya!" for International Women's Day along with Alba Messa, Ainoa Buitrago, Mery Granados, Angy, Ania, Lolita De Sola, Natasha Dupeyron, Soy Emilia, Violetta Arriaza and Volver.

== Awards ==
In 2021, Zemmoa was awarded with the Premio Maguey Queer icon Award in honor of her work as a Mexican singer.

== TV ==
=== Twourist ===
Zemmoa appeared on Twourist, a new show from TNT (American TV network), with the presenter Victoria Volkova.

== Film ==
=== BDAY ===
Was an actress in the movie BDAY directed by Andrew Lush in Los Angeles (2016).

=== Deep Gold ===
Was an actress in the movie Deep Gold from Julian Rosefeldt in Berlin in 2013.

== Discography ==
=== Albums ===
- 2013: Puro Desamor
- 2015: NNVAV
- 2018: Covers
- 2021: Lo Que Me Haces Sentir
- 2023: The Early Years
- 2025: C'est moi

=== Singles ===
- 2016: "Tiempo de Perdonar" featuring El Muertho de Tijuana
- 2021: "Mi Amor Soy Yo"
- 2022: "Querido Corazón"
- 2022: "Sígueme"
- 2023: "Soy Un Bombón"
- 2023: "Fashion Victims"
- 2024: "Vuela Más Alto" (Cover OV7 1998)
- 2024: "Queriéndonos Bien"
- 2024: "Sicilia" featuring Daniela Spalla
- 2025: "Esa No Soy Yo" featuring Reno Rojas
- 2025: "Wow"
- 2025: "Ya se Tu Plan"
- 2026: "Ahí No Es"
- 2026: "Pausa" featuring Ilse Hendrix

== Appearances ==
Zemmoa presented her new single "Soy Un Bombón" at the music Festival Axe Ceremonia 2023 at Bicentenario park among Rosalía, Travis Scott, Tokischa, M.I.A, Jamie XX, L'Impératrice and Julieta Venegas.

Zemmoa had a show together with María Daniela y su Sonido Lasser and Fangoria (band) at the Palacio de los Deportes in Mexico City, November 28. 2025.
