= Puro Desamor =

Studio album by Zemmoa
- Released: 22 January 2013
- Recorded: 2010
- Genre: Electropop; latin pop; alternative rock; glam rock
- Length: 48 minutes
- Label: Zemmporio Records
- Producer: Juan Soto, Alejandro Rosso, Alexis Zabe

Zemmoa chronology
| Puro Desamor (2013) | NNVAV (2013) |

Singles from Zemmoa Covers
- 1. "Zeuz" Released: August 9, 2010; 2. "Ya No Más" Released: July 12, 2011; 3. "Veneno" Released: October 2, 2011; 4. "Ay Mínimo Escribe Un Adiós" Released: August 10, 2012; 5. "Te Enterraré El Tacón" Released: September 13, 2013

Puro Desamor is the first studio album by Mexican singer Zemmoa, released digitally and on vinyl on 15 June 2013.

== Background ==
Zemmoa created Zemmporio Records after being told by a record company that they were not ready for an artist playing with gender identity. Then she raised funds for the production of her album through the collective financing campaign #YOYAYTÚ on Fondeadora Arca platform.

== Appearances ==
Her tour titled "The age of aquarius" debuted in Paris, where she presented her new album.

She collaborated with Absolut Vodka to create a cocktail inspired by her personality, "Black Berry Attraction by Zemmoa" within the Absolut Unique campaign.

She participated in the film Acapulco Sunset, directed by Lino Georg Von Saenger (2017) with the song "Un amor de verano" extracted from Puro Desamor Volumen 1, plus a special appearance in it. In Veintañera, divorciada y fantástica by Noé Santillán-López with the song «Mucha mujer para ti» where she also appears as herself interpreting it. She also collaborated on the soundtrack of the series Los Espookys of HBO with the song "Te enterraré el tacón".

== Track listing ==
| No. | Title | Length |
|---|---|---|
| 1. | "Zeuz" | 4:26 |
| 2. | "Un Amor de Verano" | 3:30 |
| 3. | "Ay Mínimo Escribe Un Adiós" | 4:11 |
| 4. | "Te Enterraré el Tacón" | 4:10 |
| 5. | "Veneno" | 3:43 |
| 6. | "Chat de Amor" | 4:35 |
| 7. | "Ya No Más" | 4:44 |
| 8. | "Ya No Más (Martín Parra As Magma Remix)" | 6:46 |
| 9. | "Veneno (Avanti Remix)" | 5:35 |
| 10. | "Ay Mínimo Escribe Un Adiós (André VII Remix)" | 6:06 |

== Videos ==
- Zeuz
- Ya No Más
- Veneno
- Ay Mínimo Escribe Un Adiós
- Te Enterraré El Tacón
