= Good Savage =

- Theatrical release poster
- Directed by: Santiago Mohar Volkow
- Written by: Santiago Mohar Volkow; Andrew Leland Rogers
- Produced by: Santiago Mohar Volkow; Sebastian Castillo
- Starring: Manuel Garcia-Rulfo; Naian González Norvid; Darío Yazbek Bernal; Andrew Leland Rogers
- Cinematography: Flavia Martinez
- Edited by: Fernando Guisa; Didac Palou
- Music by: Diego Lozano
- Production company: Edge Films
- Release dates: November 17, 2023 (PÖFF); July 17, 2025 (Mexico)
- Running time: 107 minutes
- Country: Mexico
- Languages: Spanish; English

Good Savage (Spanish: Buen salvaje) is a 2023 Mexican satirical black comedy film co-written, co-produced and directed by Santiago Mohar Volkow. Starring Manuel Garcia-Rulfo, Naian González Norvid, Darío Yazbek Bernal and Andrew Leland Rogers. It follows an American couple of artists who arrive in a forgotten town in Mexico where, in order to achieve their dreams, they will descend into madness.

== Synopsis ==
Tired of the monotony of New York, Jesse and Maggie decide to move to a small town in northern Mexico in search of artistic inspiration. In their new home, they meet Melitón, a local con man who becomes their creative muse. However, when Don Chelo appears with a strange request, the couple's fictions become dangerously intertwined with reality.

== Cast ==
- Manuel Garcia-Rulfo as Meliton
- Naian González Norvid as Maggie
- Darío Yazbek Bernal as Don Chelo
- Andrew Leland Rogers as Jesse
- Alejandro Edda as Fernando
- Aldo Escalante Ochoa as El Maguey

== Production ==
The film took two weeks to write the script and two weeks to shoot during the COVID-19 pandemic.

== Release ==
Good Savage had its world premiere on November 16, 2023, at the 27th Tallinn Black Nights Film Festival, then screened on February 10, 2024, at the 39th Santa Barbara International Film Festival, on May 11, 2024, at the 8th 24 Risas por Segundo International Film and Comedy Festival, on June 8, 2024, at the 39th Guadalajara International Film Festival, and on September 21, 2024, at the 16th Hola Mexico Film Festival.

The film was released commercially on July 17, 2025, in Mexican theaters.

== Accolades ==
Year	Award / Festival	Category	Recipient	Result	Ref.
2024	39th Guadalajara International Film Festival	Hecho en Jalisco - Best Film	Good Savage	Nominated	
2024	16th Hola Mexico Film Festival	Mexico Today - Best Full Feature Films	Good Savage	Nominated	

== Future ==
In July 2025, during an interview with El Capitalino, director Santiago Mohar Volkow confirmed that he has plans for a sequel: "We want to continue exploring this world... so Good Savage 2 is coming. At least they'll have all the same actors."
