= The Early Years (Zemmoa album) =

Studio album by Zemmoa
- Released: 2 June 2023
- Recorded: 2023
- Genre: Electropop; Latin pop
- Length: 36 minutes
- Label: Universal Music Group Mexico
- Producer: Zemmoa, Rafa Cuevas

Zemmoa chronology
Lo Que Me Haces Sentir (2021)	The Early Years (2023)	C'est moi (2025)

Singles from The Early Years
- 1. "Soy Un Bombón" Released: March 17, 2023; 2. "Fashion Victims" Released: April 27, 2023; 3. "Súper Heroína" Released: June 22, 2023

The Early Years is the fifth studio album by Mexican singer Zemmoa, released digitally in June 2023. She signed with Universal Music Mexico as her record label and recorded again the songs that she wrote at the beginning of her career as an independent artist.

== Background ==
Her song "Fashion Victims" was originally recorded in 2006 and describes a party with Kate Moss and Carmen Campuzano. The song sampled Shake Your Groove Thing, and was part of the soundtrack of Así del precipicio directed by Teresa Suárez.

== Appearances ==
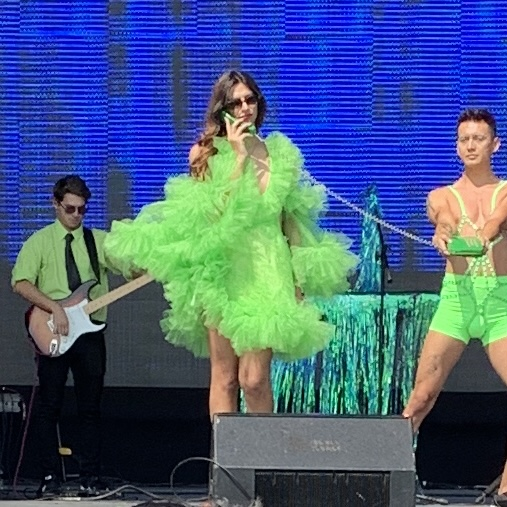
Zemmoa performing at the Festival Ceremonia in 2023

Zemmoa presented her new singles "Soy Un Bombón" and "Fashion Victims" at the Somos festival, in Puerto Vallarta, Jalisco and the music festival Axe Ceremonia 2023 at Bicentenario Park along Rosalía, Travis Scott, Tokischa, M.I.A, Jamie XX, L'Impératrice and Julieta Venegas.

== Track listing ==
No.	Title	Length
1.	"Queer Hits Radio" (Zemmoa)	1:24
2.	"Soy Un Bombón" (Zemmoa)	3:35
3.	"Alta Energia" (Zemmoa)	2:54
4.	"Fashion Victims" (Zemmoa)	3:20
5.	"Disco Damage" (Zemmoa)	3:30
6.	"Amor Para Siempre" (Zemmoa)	4:21
7.	"Super Heroina" (Zemmoa)	3:30
8.	"La Fiesta Dentro De Mi" (Zemmoa)	2:56
9.	"Lo Que Digan Las Perras" (Zemmoa, Galatzia)	2:00
10.	"Fashion Victims Rafa Cuevas Remix" (Zemmoa, Rafa Cuevas)	2:59

== Videos ==
- "Soy Un Bombón"
- "Fashion Victims"
- "Súper Heroína"
