= Humberto Busto =

Mexican actor

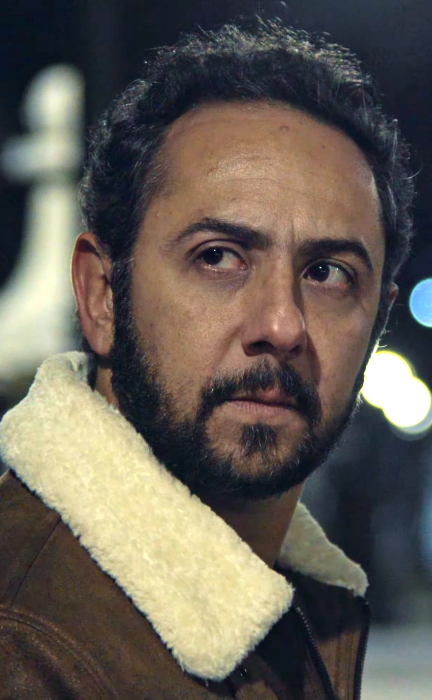
- Busto in 2019
- Born: 23 June 1978 (age 48); Mexico City, México
- Education: National Autonomous University of Mexico; California State University
- Occupation: Actor
- Years active: 1998-present

Humberto Busto Marín (born 23 June 1978) is a Mexican actor.

== Biography ==
Busto got his first major role in 1999, playing Jorge in the film Amores perros, released in 2000.

Busto's performance as Heriberto in Oso Polar won him awards for Best Actor in the 15th Morelia International Film Festival and the 5th Quito Latin American Film Festival, as well as an Ariel Award nomination.

He has been recognized as well for his work behind the camera. Under his direction, La teta de Botero (2014) and Julkita (2017) were winners of Best Short Narrative Made in Mexico award of the Oaxaca FilmFest.

From 2010 to 2012, Busto portrayed the fastidious and self-important Apolinar Caborca in the three seasons of the television series Los héroes del norte.

Humberto Busto has a degree in Dramatic Arts from the University Theater Center of the National Autonomous University of Mexico. He is an alumnus of Berlinale Talents and studied for a master's degree in film production at California State University, Northridge.

== Personal life ==
In a 2012 interview, he indirectly affirmed that he was bisexual when asked if he had felt attraction to both men and women, to which he replied, "Yes, of course! I fall in love with squirrels." Seven years later, in July 2019, he was seen actively participating in the march for sexual diversity held in Mexico City. Five years later, in July 2024, he came out as gay, also sharing that he suffered from bullying in his childhood because of his sexual orientation.

== Filmography ==
=== As director ===
- Hasta la ciruela pasa (2012)
- La teta de Botero (2014)
- Julkita (2017)

=== As actor ===
==== Film ====
- Amores perros (2000) as Jorge
- Sobreviviente (2003)
- Transit (2005) as Champinon
- Morirse en Domingo (2006) as Carlos
- Borderland (2007) as Mario
- Después de Lucía (2012) as Cook
- Abolición de la propiedad (2012) as Everio
- El Incidente (2014) as Carlos
- Los parecidos (2015) as Alvaro
- Hazlo como hombre (2017) as Eduardo
- Oso polar (2017) as Heriberto
- El club de los insomnes (2018) as Compañero

==== Television ====
- Terminales (2008) as Elías Ruíz
- Los Héroes del Norte (2010–2012) as Apolinar Caborca
- El Chapo (2018) as Conrado Sol (Don Sol)
- Diablero (2018) as Isaac El Indio
- El juego de las llaves (2019) as Óscar Romero
- High Heat (2022) as Ángel Linares

== Additional awards and recognition ==
- 2015 - Best Ibero-American short film for La teta de Botero, Guadalajara International Film Festival
- 2015 - Best short film for La teta de Botero, Guadalajara International Film Festival
- 2017 - Breakthrough actor in a series, super-series, or telenovela for his role as Conrado Higuera Sol "Don Sol" in El Chapo, PRODU Awards
