= Leona (film) =

2018 Mexican drama film directed by Isaac Cherem

- Film poster
- Directed by: Isaac Cherem
- Written by: Isaac Cherem; Naian González Norvind
- Produced by: Salomon Askenazi
- Starring: Naian González Norvind; Christian Vazquez
- Cinematography: Diana Garay
- Edited by: Roque Azcuaga
- Music by: Jacobo Lieberman
- Release date: 22 October 2018
- Running time: 94 minutes
- Country: Mexico
- Language: Spanish

Leona is a 2018 Mexican drama film and the feature film directorial debut of Isaac Cherem. It was written by Cherem and Naian González Norvind. González Norvind also stars as the protagonist as a young Jewish woman in Mexico City that falls for a non-Jewish man, Iván (Christian Vazquez).

The film premiered at the Morelia International Film Festival on 22 October 2018. The film also featured in the schedule of several international Jewish film festivals such as Philadelphia Jewish Film Festival, Atlanta Jewish Film Festival, Poland's Jewish Motifs International Film Festival and the UK Jewish Film Festival. According to Cherem, the film was released in Mexican cinemas in October 2019 followed by a North American theatrical release by Menemsha Films between the next year and 2021.

== Plot summary ==
Ariela, a young artist in Mexico City from a Syrian Jewish family is pressured into finding an appropriate partner. She develops feelings for a non-Jewish man, Iván (Christian Vazquez). This presents her with a dilemma as she weighs up the relationship against the disapproval of her family and community.

== Cast ==
- Naian González Norvind as Ariela
- Christian Vazquez as Iván
- Carolina Politi as Estrella
- Daniel Adissi as Gabriel
- Margarita Sanz as Abuela
- Ana Kupfer as Rebeca
- Emma Dib as Liz
- Rodrigo Corea as Miguel
- Elias Fasja as Simón
- Ricardo Fastlicht as Moisés
- Adriana Llabres as Cordelia

== Reception ==
The film has won a number of awards, with Naian González Norvind taking the Best Actress prize at the 2018 Morelia International Film Festival.
