= Tessa Ía =

Mexican actress

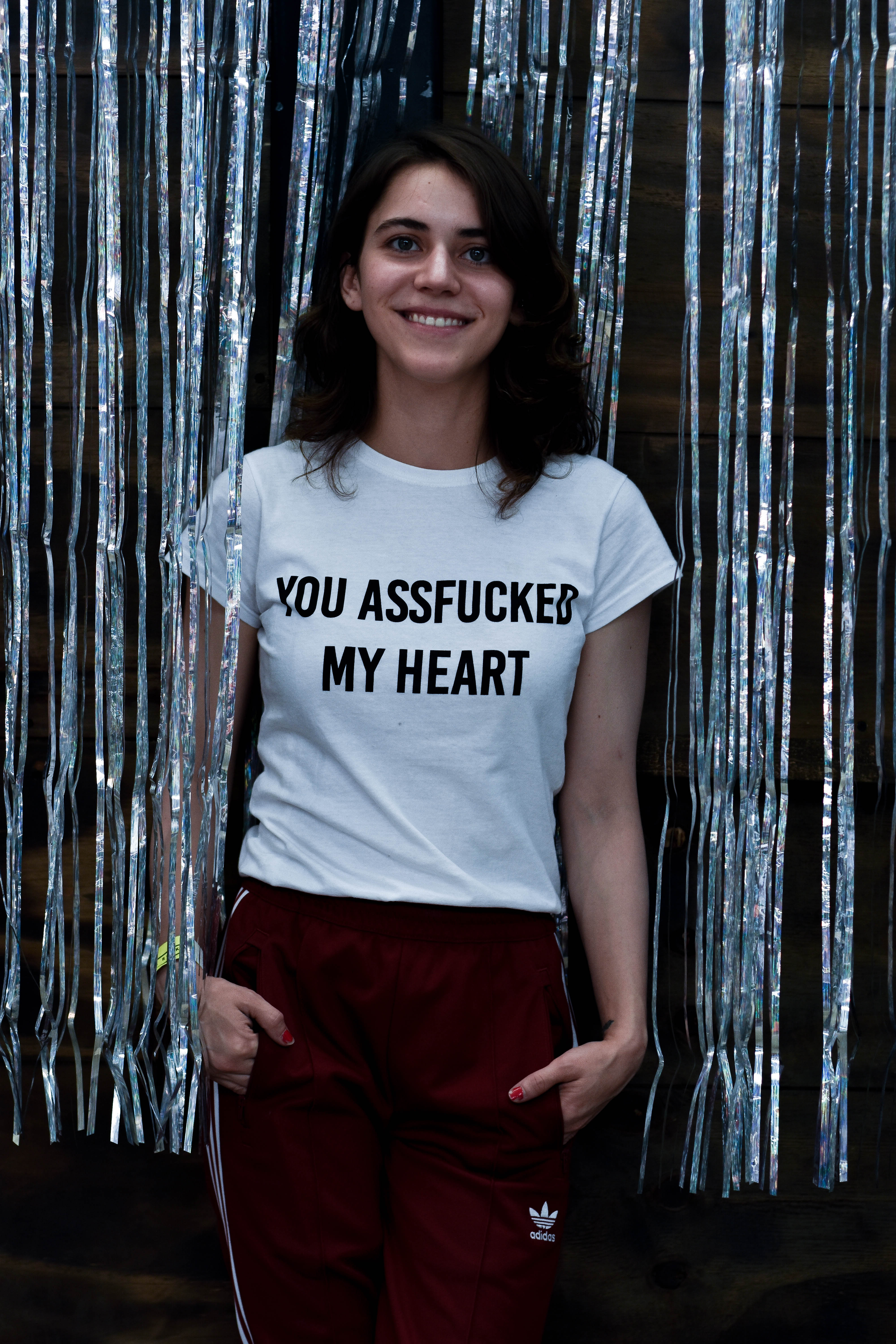
- Tessa Ía in 2018
- Born: 3 April 1995 (age 30)
- Mother: Nailea Norvind
- Relatives: Naian Gonzalez Norvind (sister); Camila Sodi (half-sister); Eva Norvind (grandmother)

Tessa Ía González Norvind (born 3 April 1995), known as Tessa Ía, is a Mexican actress best known for her starring role in After Lucia. Through her mother she belongs to the Norwegian-Mexican Norvind family of actors.

== Early life ==
Ía was born Tessa Ía González Norvind. Her father is lawyer Fernando González Parra and her mother is actress Nailea Norvind. She is the granddaughter of Norwegian-Mexican actress Eva Norvind, and through her she is of Finnish and Russian descent.

She is the younger half-sister of Camila Sodi through her father. She is also the sister of actress Naian Gonzalez Norvind.

== Career ==
=== Acting ===
Ía made her film debut in the 2008 film The Burning Plain. In 2012 she starred in the film After Lucia about a teenage girl who is violently bullied by her classmates. For her role Ía was nominated for a Young Artist Award for Best Performance in an International Feature Film - Young Actress

In 2017 she appeared in a biopic of Mexican feminist Rosario Castellanos in The Eternal Feminine, playing the role of Rosario.

She also had a role in the 2018 TV series Narcos: Mexico which starred her former brother-in-law, Diego Luna.

Ía had the leading role in the TV series De brutas, nada in 2019 playing in Pantaya in the USA.

In 2020 Ía had the lead role in the TV series Unstoppable.

In 2022 Ía once again had a lead role in the sex comedy film Two Plus Two.

=== Singing ===
Ía released her debut album, Correspondencia, in 2016.

== Musical Collaborations ==
| Song | Album | Artist | Year |
|---|---|---|---|
| Mi Amor Soy Yo featuring Trans-X | Lo Que Me Haces Sentir | Zemmoa | 2021 |
| «Tú y Yo» featuring Carla Morrison | Tú y Yo | Carla Morrison | 2018 |
