= Trans-X =

Canadian band

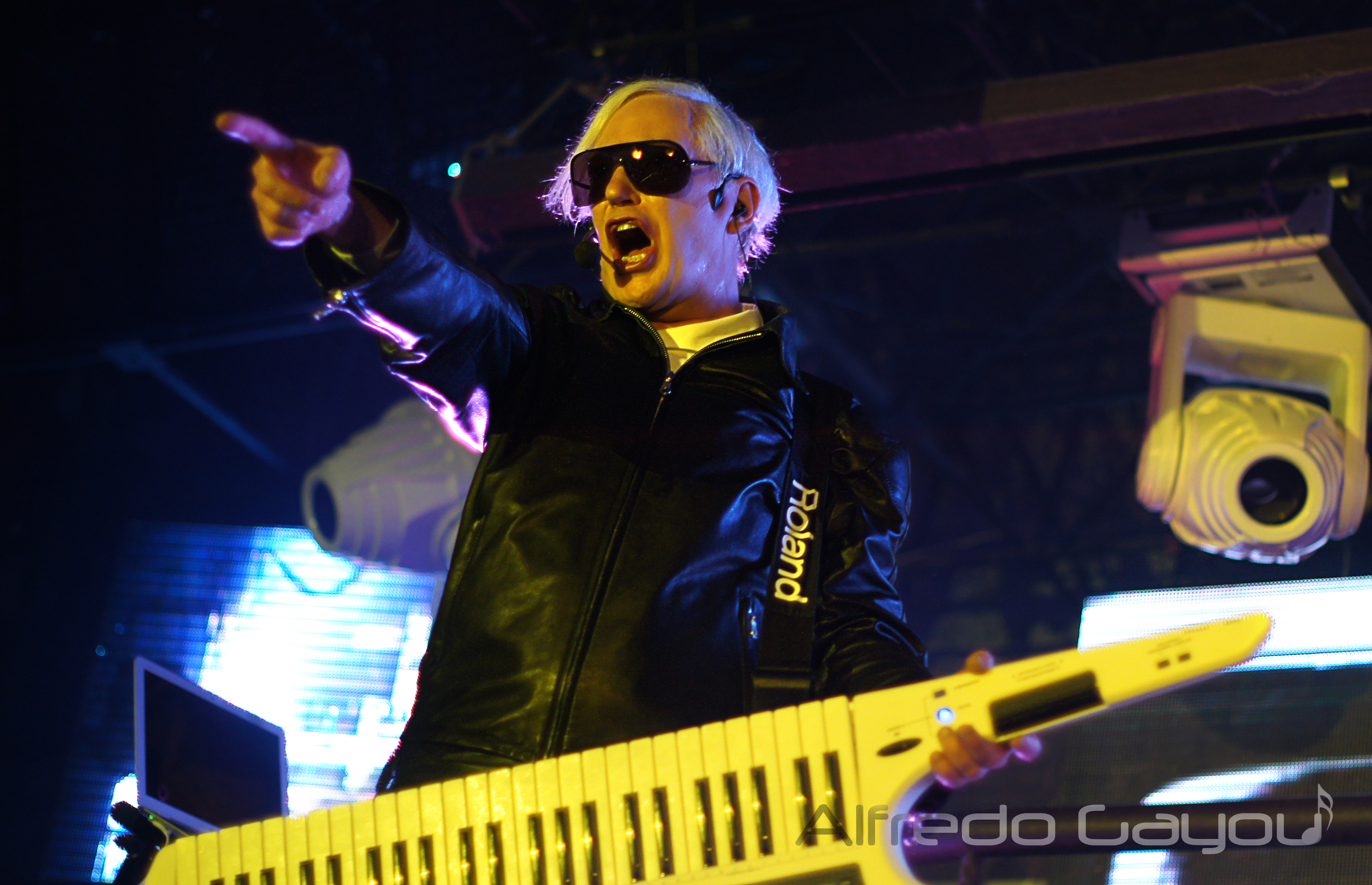
- Pascal Languirand in 2010

Background information
- Origin: Montreal, Quebec, Canada
- Genres: Synth-pop; hi-NRG
- Years active: 1981–1988; 1995–present
- Labels: Matra; Saisons; ZYX; Atlantic; Atco Records; Mirage Records
- Members: Pascal Languirand
- Website: transx-music.com

Trans-X is a Canadian synth-pop band formed in Montreal, Quebec. They are known for their hit song "Living on Video", which was a worldwide hit single.

== History ==
Trans-X was started by Canadian musician Pascal Languirand, son of Jacques Languirand. He was previously known for his albums in the ambient, cosmic and space music genres. The name of the band comes from the 1977 Kraftwerk song "Trans-Europe Express", which Languirand thought "was catchy and reflected well the direction I wanted to take with Trans-X". In 1982 he recruited Montreal keyboardist and programmer Steve Wyatt as the second half of the Trans-X duo. Together they recorded a demo that got Trans-X a recording contract for a single, "Vivre sur Vidéo".

Steve Wyatt played some synthesizer and did some programming on "Vivre sur Vidéo". He also composed "Digital World" and played all the instruments on the track, which was on the B-side of the single. "Digital World" can also be found on the maxi-single and on the band's debut album. Wyatt left Trans-X sometime in late 1983.

When "Living on Video" (the English version of "Vivre sur Vidéo") was released in May 1983, it was an instant hit in Canada and the single later sold two million copies and reached British and European Top ten charts on its 1985 release.

Later in 1983, Trans-X released another song "Message on the Radio" which did not make it into the charts, and Trans-X ended the year with another single, "3D-Dance". All these songs featured on the band's 1983 debut album, Living on Video, known in Canada as Message on the Radio. For the studio recording of the album, Anne Brosseau was hired to do backing vocals. However, she decided not to perform with Trans-X. For this reason, Montrealer Laurie Ann Gill, who performed backing vocals for synthpop group Nudimension, was recruited for promotional pictures, television performances and touring, which she did until 1985.

In 1988, Languirand decided to retire Trans-X after their second album, On My Own, failed to chart outside of Canada. After the album was released Languirand went silent for a few years and decided to continue his solo career with new age, ambient and space music instead of electronica. Also, during this time, he and songwriter/collaborator Joe Caccamise wrote and produced for other artists and worked on new Trans-X material.

In 1994, Languirand returned as Trans-X, performing live with Nadia Sohaei. Later Languirand recorded a remake of his main hit under the title "Living on Video 2003" and released The Drag-Matic Album, produced by Michel Huygen of Neuronium. One more new version of this hit, "Living on Video 2k6" was released on 6 May 2006.

As of 2010, Languirand lived in Mexico. In early 2012, he was seen performing live with Truc Quynh, better known as "TQ", a relatively well-known Italo disco singer with whom Languirand had collaborated since at least 2004. However, on the 2010 single "I Want To Be With You Tonight", the L. O. V. 2011 album and on the 2012 Hi-NRG album that was released in Mexico, Languirand was vocally accompanied by Corina Lawrence, whom he worked together with from 2008 to 2015. In 2013, Languirand sang "My Fascination" with Truc Quynh; the song became part of TQ's later album Out of the Shadows which was released in late 2014. Although Languirand was involved in singing that song, it was more of a spin-off than a pure Trans-X project. Over the years, Languirand became more and more interconnected with other artists, especially after 1988, by not solely working for Trans-X, but being able to do other projects. Sometimes he lent his voice to others, sometimes he worked for others as a producer, etc.

In 2012, Luis Broc joined the band as drummer and in 2014 he was joined by Ramón Serratos in SFX, synthesis and as a DJ of the band in live performances. Both are of Mexican origin. During 2016, the band made a series of tours in South America, reaffirming the taste for the Hi-NRG genre in diverse audiences, in the initiative of "Discolocos", a documentary film (co-written, directed and produced by David Dávila Herrera) that reflects the world of the followers of the genre since the 1980s. The film features Trans-X, who also created and sang the soundtrack (Discolocos, Vol. 1, released 2018), which has roots in classic themes from the 1980s in his tribute to the Hi-NRG and Italo disco genres, collaborating with the voices of Willie Chambers, Jessica Williams, Claudja Barry, Tobias Bernstrup, Stephan Groth, Cynthia Manley, Eskil Simonsson, Conrad Kaneshiro, Christina Criscione, and J. D. Hall.

On 9 February 2021, Trans-X launched the album Dreams Are Made of Fantasies under the label Cleopatra Records. This album was produced by Ramón Serratos in Mérida, Yucatán Mexico.

On 11 November 2021, Trans-X released the album Psy Energy under the label Skypark Records, also produced by Ramon Serratos.

== Band members ==
- Pascal Languirand – lead vocals, keytar, synthesizers, keyboards, & drum machines (1982–present)

=== Current touring musicians ===
- Luis Broc – electronic drums (2012–present)
- Ramón Serratos – DJ, synthesizers (2014–present)
- Luana Viana de Souza – vocals, guitars (2020–present)

=== Former members and touring musicians ===
- Steve Wyatt – synthesizers, programming (1982–1983)
- Anne Brosseau – backing vocals (1983)
- Laurie Ann Gill – backing vocals (1983–1985)
- Eulalia Batlle Vives – vocals, choreography (1994–2004)
- Nadia Sohaei – backing vocals, synthesizers (1994–2004)
- Corina Lawrence – backing vocals (2008–2012)
- Julia Manrique – vocals (2016)
- Lily Contreras – backing vocals (2018–2020)
- Aletz Franco – electronic drums, percussion (2018–2020)

== Discography ==
=== Albums ===
- Living on Video (also known as Message on the Radio) (1983)
- On My Own (1988)
- Trans-X'Xcess (1995)
- 010101 (2001)
- The Drag-Matic Album (2003)
- L.O.V. 2011 (2011)
- Hi-NRG (2012)
- Anthology (2014)
- Discolocos, Vol. 1 (Original Motion Picture Soundtrack) (2018)
- Dreams Are Made of Fantasies (2020)
- Psy Energy (2021)
- Teyolia (2022)

=== Singles ===
Year	Single	Chart Positions									
Year	Single	AUS	BE	GER	IRE	NL	QUE	SPA	SWI	UK	US
1983	"Vivre sur Vidéo"	—	—	—	—	—	3	—	—	—	—
1983	"Living on Video"	—	13	3	—	16	—	3	2	77	—
1983	"Message on the Radio"	—	30	28	—	—	—	—	—	—	—
1983	"3-D Dance"	—	—	58	—	—	—	—	—	—	—
1985	"Living on Video" (radio remix version)	40	—	—	17	—	—	—	—	9	61
1986	"Ich Liebe Dich (I Love You)"	—	—	—	—	—	—	—	—	—	—
1986	"Monkey Dance"	—	—	—	—	—	—	—	—	—	—
1988	"Maria"	—	—	—	—	—	—	—	—	—	—
1995	"A New Life on Video"	—	—	—	—	—	—	—	—	—	—
1995	"To Be... Or Not to Be"	—	—	—	—	—	—	—	—	—	—
2001	"I Feel the Passion"	—	—	—	—	—	—	—	—	—	—
2003	"Living on Video 2003"	—	—	—	—	—	—	—	—	—	—
2006	"Living on Video 2K6"	—	—	—	—	—	—	—	—	—	—
2010	"I Want to Be with You Tonight"	—	—	—	—	—	—	—	—	—	—
2011	"L.O.V. 2011"	—	—	—	—	—	—	—	—	—	—
2015	"Video Night" (Mirko Hirsch featuring Trans-X)	—	—	—	—	—	—	—	—	—	—
2018	"Fascination"	—	—	—	—	—	—	—	—	—	—
2018	"Videodrome" (with Tobias Bernstrup)	—	—	—	—	—	—	—	—	—	—
2021	"One Last Dance" (with Cascada)	—	—	—	—	—	—	—	—	—	—
"—" denotes releases that did not chart or were not released in that territory.

== Musical collaborations ==
Song	Album	Artist	Year
Mi Amor Soy Yo featuring Tessa Ía	Lo Que Me Haces Sentir	Zemmoa	2021

=== Solo albums by Pascal Languirand ===
- Minos (1978) (LP only)
- De Harmonia Universalia (1980) (LP only)
- Vivre Ici Maintenant (1981) (LP only)
- Gregorian Waves (1991)
- Ishtar (1993)
- Renaissance (2002)
- LSD (as Cybernium; collaboration with Michel Huygen) (2003)
- Incanta (2005)
