= C'est moi (album) =

Studio album by Zemmoa
- Released: 20 March 2025
- Recorded: 2024
- Genre: Electropop; Latin pop
- Length: 36 minutes
- Label: Universal Music Group Mexico
- Producer: Zemmoa, Alfredo Cabello Calzado, Juan José Soto Montiel & Martin Grinfeld

Zemmoa chronology
The Early Years (2023)	C'est moi (2025)

Singles from Zemmoa, C'est Moi
- 1. "Mio Gladiatore" Released: March 7, 2024; 2. "Mi Favorita Canción featuring Juliana Gattas" Released: July 18, 2024; 3. "Tengo El Poder" Released: August 29, 2024; 4. "John Travolta Flow featuring Lenchanter" Released: November 8, 2024; 5. "Tanto Para Dar" Released: November 29, 2024; 6. "A Ningún Lugar featuring Majo Aguilar" Released: January 30, 2025; 7. "Diablísima" Released: March 20, 2025

C'est moi is the sixth studio album by Mexican singer Zemmoa, released digitally in March 2025 with her record label Universal Music Mexico.

== Appearances ==
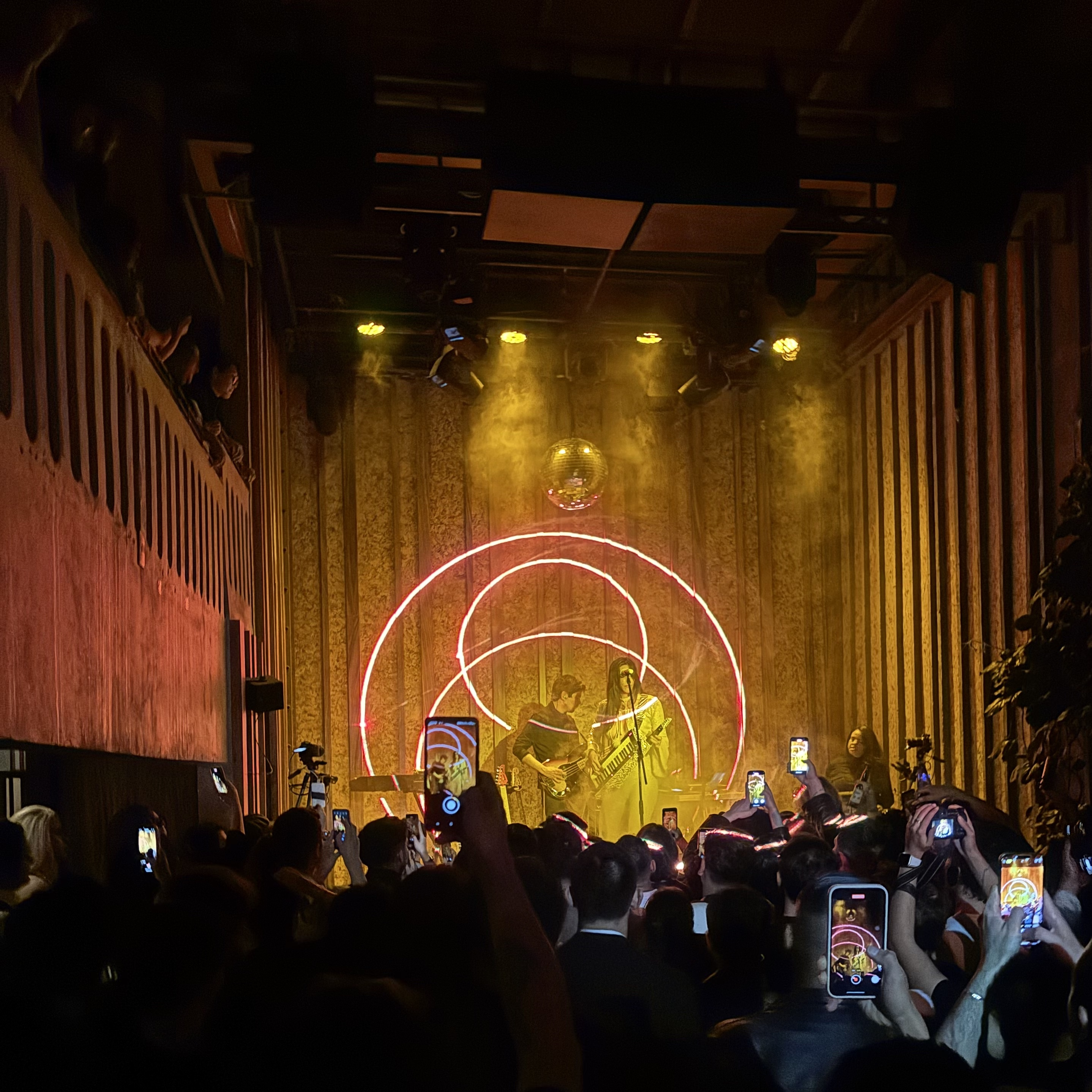
Zemmoa performing in 2024

Zemmoa presented her new album "Zemmoa, C'est Moi" at Tonal, in Mexico City. She performed her single "Queriéndonos Bien" and "John Travolta Flow" featuring Lenchanter. Zemmoa was accompanied by DJ sets from Victoria Volkova, America Fendi, and Loreto K.O., hosted by Mis$ Mickey.

== Track listing ==
1. "Soy Yo"
2. "Princesa De Cuento"
3. "Te Lo Mereces"
4. "Mi Favorita Canción" featuring Juliana Gattas
5. "Diablísima"
6. "Queriéndonos Bien
7. "John Travolta Flow" featuring Lenchanter
8. "Mio Gladiatore"
9. "Colocada"
10. "Chica del Rock"
11. "Tengo El Poder"
12. "Tanto Para Dar"
13. "A Ningún Lugar" featuring Majo Aguilar

== See also ==
- c'est moi
