= After Lucia =

2012 film directed by Michel Franco

- Film poster
- Spanish: Después de Lucía
- Directed by: Michel Franco
- Produced by: Michel Franco; Marco Polo Constandse; Elías Menassé; Fernando Rovzar; Alexis Fridman.
- Starring: Tessa Ía González Norvind
- Cinematography: Chuy Chávez
- Release dates: 21 May 2012 (Cannes); 19 October 2012 (México)
- Running time: 102 minutes
- Country: Mexico
- Language: Spanish

After Lucia (Spanish: Después de Lucía) is a 2012 Mexican drama film directed by Michel Franco. The film competed in the Un Certain Regard section at the 2012 Cannes Film Festival where it won the top prize. The film was also selected as the Mexican entry for the Best Foreign Language Oscar at the 85th Academy Awards, but it did not make the final shortlist. The style of the film has been described as being influenced by Austrian director Michael Haneke.

== Plot ==
Roberto is depressed after his wife, Lucía, dies in a road accident. He decides to leave Puerto Vallarta and move to Mexico City with his 17-year-old daughter, Alejandra. Settling into her new school, Alejandra goes to a party one night with her classmates. At the party, she has sex with José, who films the encounter on his phone. The next day the footage has been circulated around the school, with Alejandra getting text messages calling her a slut. This provides an excuse for fellow students to bully and sexually harass her. She does not speak of these incidents to anyone.

The school organises a trip to Veracruz which all students must attend. At the resort, each room is shared by groups of four. Alejandra is bullied again into going into the shower by her female roommates. They then block the door of the bathroom. At night, while the rest of the students enjoy a party in the main room, the boys take turns to enter the bathroom and rape her.

The students then go to the beach to continue the party. When it ends, Alejandra is asleep on the beach as one of the boys urinates on her. One of the female students suggests she should go into the sea to wash herself. The rest join her and they have fun in the water. Alejandra disappears and the rest become anxious about repercussions. The next morning, the teachers discover she is missing and alert her father. He finds out about the bullying and is frustrated when the police cannot take action, as the crimes have been committed by minors.

Unbeknown to everyone, Alejandra is safe in a building where she went to sleep. Meanwhile, her father follows a car driven by José's father and kidnaps José after his father went to park his car. He ties Jose's hands behind his back and gags him. He drives to the coast where he hires a boat and takes José out to sea where he throws him overboard, before starting the engine again and continuing to ride in the sea.

== Cast ==
- Tessa Ía González Norvind as Alejandra
- Hernán Mendoza as Roberto
- Gonzalo Vega Sisto as José
- Tamara Yazbek Bernal as Tamara
- Paloma Cervantes as Irene
- Juan Carlos Barranco as Manuel
- Francisco Rueda as Javier
- Diego Canales

== Reception ==
=== Critical response ===
After Lucia has an approval rating of 86% on review aggregator website Rotten Tomatoes, based on 7 reviews, and an average rating of 9/10.

=== Accolades ===
Award	Category	Recipient(s)	Result
Cannes Film Festival	Prize of Un Certain Regard		Won
Chicago International Film Festival	Silver Hugo Special Jury Prize		Won
Young Artist Award	Best Performance in an International Feature Film - Young Actress	Tessa la González	Nominated
Havana Film Festival	Best Director		Won
San Sebastián International Film Festival	Horizons Award - Special Mention		Won

== See also ==
- List of submissions to the 85th Academy Awards for Best Foreign Language Film
- List of Mexican submissions for the Academy Award for Best Foreign Language Film
