= Camila Sodi =

Mexican singer, actress and model (born 1986)

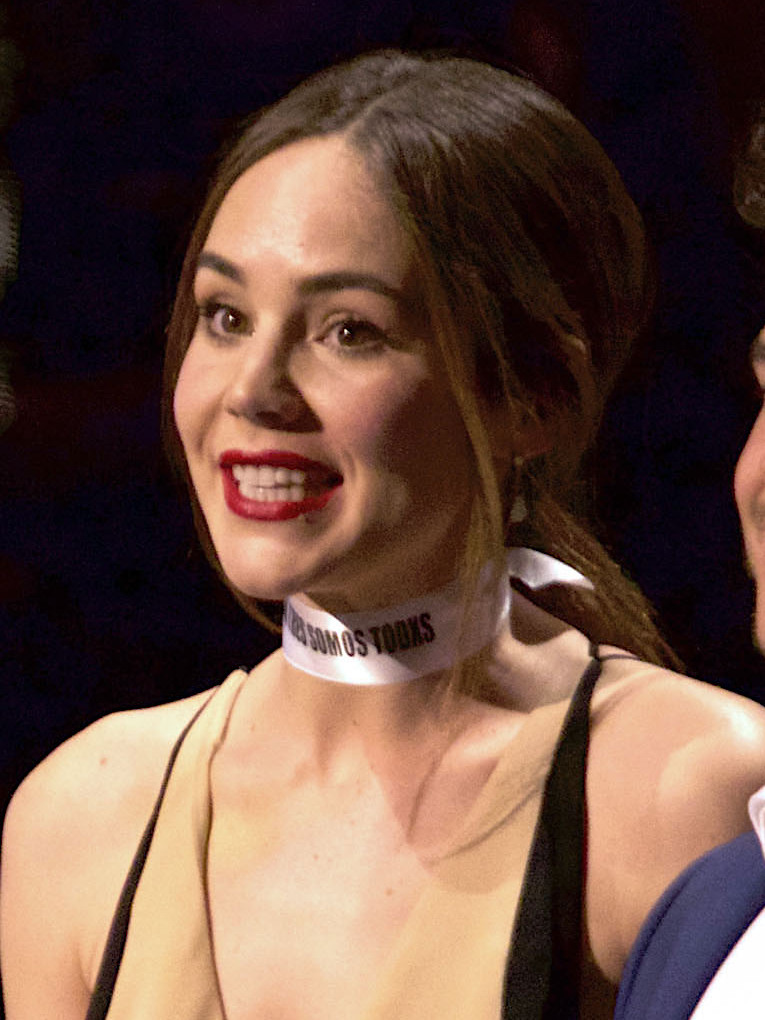
- Sodi in 2018
- Born: Camila Ía González Sodi; 14 May 1986 (age 39); Mexico City, Mexico
- Occupations: Singer; actress; model
- Years active: 2002–present
- Height: 160 cm (5 ft 3 in)
- Spouse: Diego Luna (m. 2008; div. 2013)
- Children: 2
- Relatives: Naian Gonzalez Norvind (half-sister); Tessa Ía (half-sister); Thalía (aunt); Laura Zapata (half-aunt)
- Family: Sodi
- Musical career
- Genres: Latin rock; Indie pop
- Instrument: Vocals

Camila Ía González Sodi (Spanish pronunciation: [kaˈmila ˈia ɣonˈsales ˈsoði]; born 14 May 1986) is a Mexican singer, actress and model. She is the niece of the singer and actress Thalía and a member of the Sodi family.

== Family life ==
Camila Ía González Sodi was born in Mexico City, Mexico, to Ernestina Sodi Miranda and Fernando González Parra. Through her father, she has two younger half-sisters, actresses Naian Gonzalez Norvind and Tessa Ía.

== Career ==
Sodi began her career as a model and was the host of a music video show on the Mexican cable network TeleHit. She starred in the telenovela Inocente de Ti (2004–2005).

In March 2007, Sodi featured in the film Niñas Mal, directed by Fernando Sariñana, where she shares credits with Martha Higareda, Ximena Sariñana and Blanca Guerra, among other actresses. In August of the same year, Sodi made her feature film debut in the film The Night Buffalo.

In 2015, after 11 years away from soap operas, Sodi confirmed her participation as the protagonist in the production of Carlos Moreno Laguillo entitled A que no me dejas, a version of the successful 1988 telenovela Amor en silencio, produced by Carla Estrada and written by Liliana Abud and Eric Vonn.

In 2020, Sodi starred in the new version of the soap opera Rubí, which featured a 26-episode format under the production of Carlos Bardasano.

== Personal life ==
Sodi was married to actor Diego Luna from 2008 to 2013. They have two children: Jerónimo (born 9 August 2008) and Fiona (born 1 July 2010), named after Luna's mother.

== Filmography ==
=== Film roles ===
Year	Title	Roles	Notes
2007	El búfalo de la noche	Rebeca	
2007	Niñas mal	Pía	
2007	Déficit	Elisa	
2008	Arráncame la vida	Lilia Ascencio	
2014	El despertar	Woman	Short film
2014	Amor de mis amores	Andrea	
2015	El placer es mio	Camila	
2016	Compadres	Emilia	
2017	How to Break Up with Your Douchebag	Natalia	
2017	El ángel en el reloj	Martina	
2017	Camino a Marte	Violeta	
2018	Here Comes the Grump	Princess Dawn	Voice role
2020	El exorcismo de Carmen Farías	Carmen	

=== Television roles ===
Year	Title	Roles	Notes
2004–2005	Inocente de ti	Flor de María "Florecita" González	Main role; 130 episodes
2015	Señorita Pólvora	Valentina Cárdenas	Main role; 70 episodes
2015–2016	A que no me dejas	Paulina Murat / Valentina Olmedo	Main role; 140 episodes
2016	Made in Hollywood	Herself	Episode: "Elvis & Nixon/The Meddler/Compadres"
2016	Un mal date	Ex	Episode: "Ex"
2018	Wild District	Giselle	Main role (season 1); 10 episodes
2018–2021	Luis Miguel: The Series	Erika	Main role (season 1–2); 12 episodes
2018–2021	Falsa identidad	Isabel Fernández / Camila de Guevara / Lisa Dunn	Main role (seasons 1–2); 109 episodes
2020	Rubí	Rubí Pérez Ochoa	Main role; 26 episodes
2023	Cualquier parecido	Carlota	Main role; also creator

== Album ==
- Ella & El Muerto (2013)

== See also ==
- Sodi family
