= Sleepover =

Party where guests stay overnight

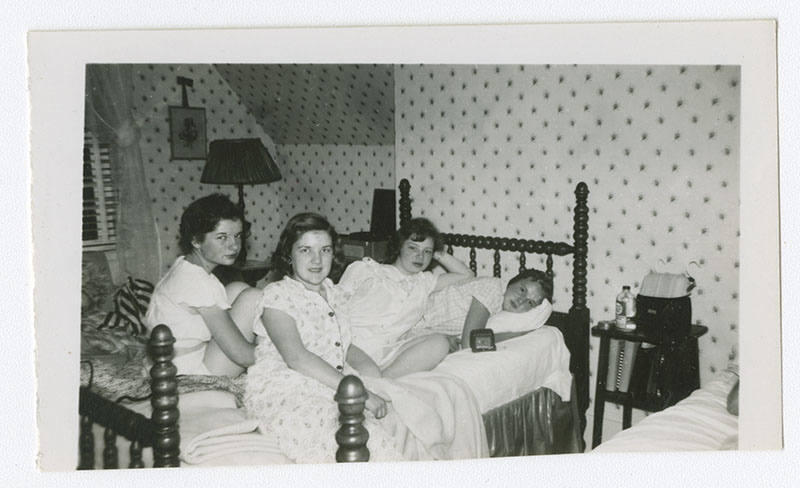
Teenage girls at a sleepover, Gainesville, Georgia, 1952

A sleepover, also known as a slumber party or pajama party, is a social occasion in which a person stays at the home of a friend. Multiple people and/or friends may sleep over at the friend's home. Typically a child or adolescent will partake in a sleepover; however, an adult or older person may sleep at a friend's home.

== Characteristics ==
A sleepover typically involves children or teenagers spending the night at a friend's home without adult supervision, though parents or guardians are usually present in the household. Activities often include games, movies, snacks, and late-night conversations, fostering social bonds. Sleepovers are widely regarded as a rite of passage, helping young people build independence, strengthen friendships, and develop social skills outside their family unit. In the United States, sleepovers are a cultural staple, often associated with milestones like birthdays or school breaks.

Globally, sleepovers vary in prevalence and style. In the United Kingdom, they are similarly popular, often called "sleepovers" or "stayovers," with activities like watching films or playing video games. In Japan, sleepovers (known as otomarikai (おとまりかい)) are less common due to cultural emphasis on family privacy and space constraints in urban homes, but they occur among close friends, often tied to school events or cultural festivals. In Australia, sleepovers resemble those in the U.S., frequently involving outdoor activities like camping in backyards. In some cultures, such as in parts of South Asia or the Middle East, overnight gatherings may be less common due to cultural norms prioritizing family-based socializing or gender-segregated interactions, but modern urban youth increasingly adopt Western-style sleepovers.

== Teen sleepovers ==
Beginning in the 1990s, commentators wrote about a perceived new trend of parents endorsing sleepovers for teenagers, with both boys and girls staying overnight together. While some writers decried the trend, others defended it as a safer alternative to teenage dating outside the house.
