= Living on Video =

1983 song by Canadian synth-pop group Trans-X

Single by Trans-X

from the album Living on Video
- Released: May 3, 1983
- Recorded: March 1983
- Genre: Synth-pop
- Length: 5:55 (LP version)
- Label: Polydor, Atco
- Songwriter: Pascal Languirand
- Producers: Dominique Nicodemo; Carmine Nicodemo

Trans-X singles chronology
"Message on the Radio" (1983)	"Living on Video" (1983)	"3-D Dance" (1983)

Music video
- "Living on Video" on YouTube

"Living on Video" is a song by Canadian synth-pop band Trans-X written and published in 1982, but not released as a single until May 1983 by Polydor Records, and then remixed for re-release in 1985. Trans-X also originally recorded a French-language version under the title "Vivre sur Vidéo". The song has been covered by many artists throughout the years.

== Trans-X version ==
The song is featured on the band's debut album, Living on Video. In its original release in 1983, the song only managed to reach No. 77 in the UK. It was remixed and re-released in 1985, peaking at No. 9 in the UK and also charting in the US, reaching No. 61 on Billboard and No. 77 on the Cashbox charts. This version featured on the US version of band's 1986 second album, also called Living on Video. The band re-recorded the song in 1986 and released it as a 12" maxi single, although the fact that it was re-recorded was not mentioned. This was featured on the Canadian version of their second album. In 1984, the track was re-produced for Metromix by Norman Jester (DJ Dizzo) for a 12" club mix adding fresh synths and a powerful 808 beat.

=== Music video ===
The music video features the band performing the song in a room with several TVs and a Commodore PET. A Roland SH-101 keytar is also featured, which Languirand uses. It was filmed in Munich, Germany and is a live performance from the TV show Formel Eins in 1984. As of 2026, it has 82 million views on YouTube.

=== Track listings ===
==== 1983 ====
7" single

1. "Living on Video" — 4:18
2. "Digital World" — 3:30

12" single

1. "Living on Video" (Long Version) — 5:55
2. "Digital World" — 3:30

12" maxi

1. "Living on Video" — 5:55
2. "Vivre sur Vidéo" — 6:13
3. "Living on Video" (Remix) — 6:42

==== 1985 ====
7" single

1. "Living on Video" ('85 Big Mix) — 5:32
2. "Digital Word" — 3:30

12" maxi

1. "Living on Video" ('85 Big Mix) — 5:32
2. "Living on Video" (Dub Mix) — 6:30
3. "Digital Word" — 3:30

==== 1986 ====
12" maxi

1. "Living on Video" — 6:59
2. "Living on Video" (Instrumental) — 5:00
3. "Living on Video" (Radio Version) — 3:40

=== Charts ===
==== Weekly charts ====
Chart (1983–1984)	Peak position
Austria (Ö3 Austria Top 40)	8
Belgium (Ultratop 50 Flanders)	13
Netherlands (Dutch Top 40)	12
Netherlands (Single Top 100)	16
Spain (AFYVE)	3
Switzerland (Schweizer Hitparade)	2
UK Singles (Official Charts)	77
West Germany (GfK)	4

Chart (1985–1986)	Peak position
Australia (Kent Music Report)	40
Ireland (IRMA)	17
UK Singles (Official Charts)	9
US Billboard Hot 100	61
US Cashbox Top 100	77

==== Year-end charts ====
Chart (1983)	Position
Switzerland (Schweizer Hitparade)	19
West Germany (Official German Charts)	24

== 2 Brothers on the 4th Floor version ==
"Living in Cyberspace"

Single by 2 Brothers on the 4th Floor
- Released: November 1999
- Recorded: 1999
- Genre: Eurodance
- Length: 3:44
- Label: ZYX
- Songwriters: Pascal Languirand, Bobby Boer, Dancability
- Producer: 2 Brothers on the 4th Floor

2 Brothers on the 4th Floor singles chronology
"Heaven Is Here" (1999)	"Living in Cyberspace" (1999)	"Wonderful Feeling" (2000)

In 1999, 2 Brothers on the 4th Floor released their version of the song titled "Living in Cyberspace". Musically, it resembles the original score, but is adapted to the 1990s. The same applies in part to the text; the original text was indeed adopted, but supplemented by a few lines. Although the cover never appeared on a studio album, it is included on the compilations Summer Hit Mix 2000 and Best of 2 Brothers on the 4th Floor.

=== Track listings ===
CD-maxi

1. "Living in Cyberspace" (Snapshot RMX II) - 3:19
2. "Living in Cyberspace" (Radio Version) - 3:44
3. "Living in Cyberspace" (Lick Discomix) - 5:45

=== Charts ===
Chart (1999)	Peak position
Dutch Top 40	28

== Pakito version ==
"Living on Video"

Single by Pakito

from the album Video
- B-side: "Remix"
- Released: June 27, 2006
- Recorded: France
- Genre: Electronic, house
- Length: 3:19
- Label: Pan Music, Universal Licensing Music
- Songwriter: Pascal Languirand
- Producer: Julien Ranouil

Pakito singles chronology
"Living on Video" (2006)	"Moving on Stereo" (2006)

In 2006, Pakito released their debut album Video containing their debut single "Living on Video" and another remix. It reached number one in France for four weeks and hit the charts in several other countries. As of July 2014, it was the 85th best-selling single of the 21st century in France, with 328,000 units sold.

=== Track listings ===
CD maxi

1. "Living on Video" (original radio edit) — 3:20
2. "Living on Video" (noot's vocal radio edit) — 3:10
3. "Living on Video" (original mix) — 5:36
4. "Living on Video" (noot's vocal mix) — 6:34

=== Charts and sales ===
==== Peak positions ====
Chart (2006)	Peak position
Belgian (Flanders) Singles Chart	25
Belgian (Wallonia) Singles Chart	3
Dutch Singles Chart	7
Eurochart Hot 100	3
French SNEP Singles Chart	1
Russia Airplay (TopHit)	8
Swedish Singles Chart	43

==== End of year charts ====
2006 year-end chart performance for "Living on Video" by Pakito
Chart (2006)	Position
Belgian (Wallonia) Singles Chart	6
Dutch Top 40	8
French Airplay Chart	35
French Club Chart	1
French TV Music Videos Chart	32
French Singles Chart	6
Russia Airplay (TopHit)	68

2007 year-end chart performance for "Living on Video" by Pakito
Chart (2007)	Position
Russia Airplay (TopHit)	200

==== Certifications ====
Country	Certification	Date	Sales certified
Belgium	Gold	September 23, 2006	20,000
France	Platinum	August 30, 2006	300,000

=== Other remixes and versions ===
It was remixed by Trans-X in 2003 and again in 2006. The song has also been remixed by U96 as "Love Sees No Colour (Version 2)", Nathalie De Borah, DJ Piccolo, Dr. Lektroluv, Trance XS, Cardenia, Cosmo & Tom, Culture Beat, DJ Interface, Ratty, Lazard, Gary D, Masterboy, Pin-Occhio (as "Tu Tatuta Tuta Ta"), Potatoheadz and by both Tronix Dj and Recorder, Stream (in 2016). It also has been covered as "Vivre Sur Video" by Vive la Fête. Most recently, it was covered by the band HexRX for the Das Bunker: Choice of a New Generation compilation. In 2012, "Robots", a single by Belgian singer Kate Ryan, sampled the song. Also, in 2013, it was used as the main theme in the song "Get Ready Now" by Beatmaker. Arash sampled the song in 2014 under the name SLR. Parts of the song has also been remixed by Logobi GT as "Gâter le Koin" (from La Puissance in 2010). The electronic music group Frozen Plasma covered the song on their 2015 album Decadenz.
