= Marcello Lippi =

Italian football manager (born 1948)

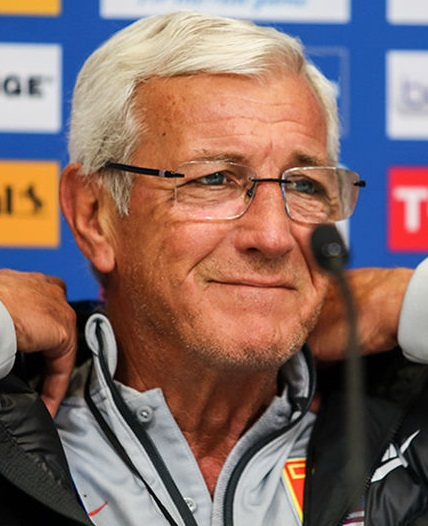
- Lippi as China manager in 2019

Personal information
- Full name: Marcello Romeo Lippi
- Date of birth: 12 April 1948 (age 78)
- Place of birth: Viareggio, Italy
- Height: 1.82 m (6 ft 0 in)
- Position: Sweeper

Youth career
- 1963–1969: Viareggio

Senior career*
Years	Team	Apps	(Gls)
1969–1979	Sampdoria	274	(5)
1969–1970	→ Savona (loan)	21	(2)
1979–1981	Pistoiese	45	(0)
1981–1982	Lucchese	23	(0)
Total		363	(7)

International career
1971	Italy U23	2	(0)

Managerial career
- 1985–1986: Pontedera
- 1986–1987: Siena
- 1987–1988: Pistoiese
- 1988–1989: Carrarese
- 1989–1991: Cesena
- 1991–1992: Lucchese
- 1992–1993: Atalanta
- 1993–1994: Napoli
- 1994–1999: Juventus
- 1999–2000: Inter Milan
- 2001–2004: Juventus
- 2004–2006: Italy
- 2008–2010: Italy
- 2012–2014: Guangzhou Evergrande
- 2016–2019: China
- 2019: China
Medal record
Men's football
Representing Italy (as manager)
FIFA World Cup
Winner	2006 Germany
- * Club domestic league appearances and goals

Marcello Romeo Lippi Commendatore OMRI (Italian pronunciation: [marˈtʃɛllo ˈlippi]; born 12 April 1948) is an Italian former professional football player and former manager, who led the Italy national team to victory in the 2006 FIFA World Cup. He was appointed as Italy head coach in the summer of 2004 and 2008, and he was succeeded by Cesare Prandelli after a disappointing performance in the 2010 FIFA World Cup. Lippi is regarded as one of the greatest and most successful managers in football history.

Throughout his career as a manager, he won one World Cup, one UEFA Champions League, five Serie A titles, three Chinese Super League titles, one Coppa Italia, one Chinese FA Cup, four Italian Supercups, one AFC Champions League, one UEFA Super Cup, and one Intercontinental Cup. Lippi is the first and to date the only coach to win both the UEFA Champions League and the AFC Champions League. He is also the first coach to have won the most prestigious international competitions both for clubs in different continents, and for national teams (the UEFA Champions League and the Intercontinental Cup in 1996 with Juventus; the AFC Champions League in 2013 with Guangzhou Evergrande; and the FIFA World Cup in 2006 with Italy).

The Times included him on its list of the top 50 managers of all time in 2007. He was named the world's best football manager by the International Federation of Football History & Statistics (IFFHS) both in 1996 and 1998 and the world's best National coach in 2006.

== Club career ==
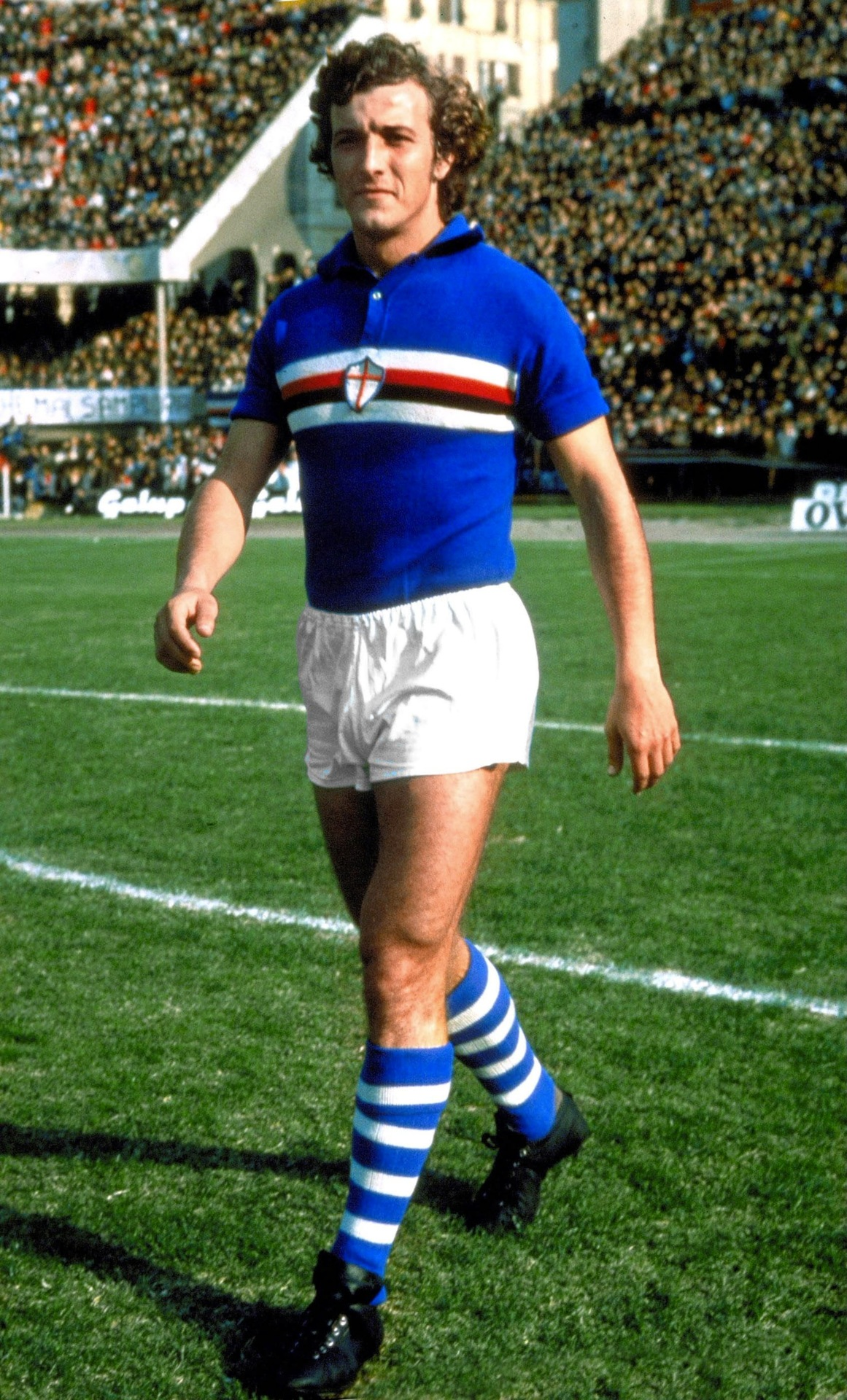
Lippi with Sampdoria in 1972

Born on 12 April 1948 in Viareggio, in northern Tuscany, Lippi began his professional career as a defender in 1969, in the role of sweeper. He spent most of his playing years with Sampdoria, where he played consecutively from 1969 to 1978, except for a year on loan at Savona. In 1979, he joined Pistoiese, being part of the Arancioni's promotion to Serie A. He finished his playing career with Lucchese.

== Coaching career ==
=== Early career ===
Lippi retired from active football in 1982, at the age of 34, to pursue a coaching career. Despite never having played for Italy at senior level, Lippi gained experience playing in his country's top flight as a central defender for Sampdoria. His rise to the top of the managerial tree also began at the Genoese club, where he started as a youth-team coach. After various stints in Italy's lower divisions, he became a head coach in Serie A in 1989 with Cesena. Lippi then moved on to Lucchese and Atalanta. The turning point for Lippi came in the 1993–94 season when he led Napoli to a place in the UEFA Cup.

=== Juventus ===
With his success at Napoli, Lippi became a managerial target for the top Serie A clubs, with Juventus ultimately winning the race to secure his services. He won the Serie A title and the Coppa Italia in his first season at the club, also reaching the 1995 UEFA Cup final, with a team that included players who would play an important role in the club's future successes, including Gianluca Vialli, Fabrizio Ravanelli, Roberto Baggio, Alessandro Del Piero, Angelo Peruzzi, Angelo Di Livio, Moreno Torricelli, Didier Deschamps, Paulo Sousa, Antonio Conte, Alessio Tacchinardi and Giancarlo Marocchi, as well as Ciro Ferrara, a player Lippi had previously coached at Napoli and who later acted as his assistant with the Azzurri. He made the team less dependent on the individual plays of Baggio, and also helped Vialli and Ravanelli rediscover their goalscoring form, in addition to introducing a young Del Piero into the starting line-up in a 4–3–3 formation, following Baggio's injury.

The following season, Lippi guided Juventus to 1995 Supercoppa Italiana and the 1995–96 UEFA Champions League titles. With the arrival of several new key players which included Zinedine Zidane, Edgar Davids, Filippo Inzaghi, Mark Iuliano, Paolo Montero and Igor Tudor, these victories were followed by consecutive league titles, the 1996 UEFA Super Cup, the 1996 Intercontinental Cup and the 1997 Supercoppa Italiana, as well as two more consecutive Champions League finals and another semi-final.

=== Inter ===
After five highly successful seasons at Juventus, Lippi moved to Inter Milan in 1999, leading the club to a fourth-place finish in the league and the 2000 Coppa Italia final, though he was sacked after suffering a disappointing defeat in the first match-day of the 2000–01 Serie A season; having previously also received significant criticism due to his poor results in his previous season with the Nerazzurri, and after Inter were eliminated from the 2000–01 UEFA Champions League in the third qualifying round by Swedish underdogs Helsingborg without managing to score a goal over the two legs.

=== Second spell with Juventus ===
Following the sacking of Carlo Ancelotti, Lippi was subsequently re-appointed as Juventus' head coach for the 2001–02 season. Following the departure of Inzaghi to Milan and Zidane to Real Madrid for a world record fee, the club acquired Pavel Nedvěd, Gianluigi Buffon and Lilian Thuram to reinforce its line-up, and managed to win two further scudetti under Lippi, as he also led the Bianconeri to consecutive Supercoppa Italiana titles and two Coppa Italia finals, as well as the 2003 UEFA Champions League final held at Old Trafford; however, Juventus lost out to Milan in a penalty shootout after both the teams failed to score during regulation and extra time.

=== Other ===
In March 2007, Lippi managed a Europe XI team who played Manchester United in a UEFA Celebration Match, commemorating the 50th anniversary of the signing of the Treaty of Rome and the 50th year of Manchester United's participation in European competitions. His team lost 4–3 at Old Trafford.

=== Italy national team ===
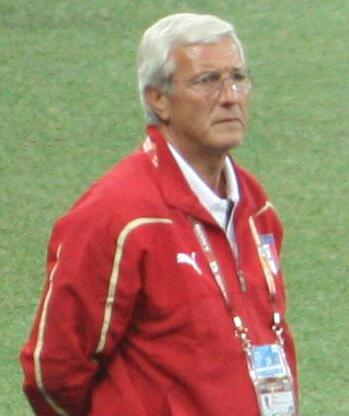
Lippi during the 2010 World Cup

Lippi was appointed head of the Italy national team in July 2004, following a disappointing UEFA Euro 2004 campaign under Giovanni Trapattoni. The Azzurri secured their passage to the FIFA World Cup finals with relative ease and subsequent victories, such as the 3–1 victory over the Netherlands and a 4–1 win over Germany in friendly matches, which raised expectations considerably. During the late weeks of the 2005–06 season, Lippi was under scrutiny surrounding the 2006 Serie A scandal (Calciopoli), blamed because of his long-standing ties and previous history with Juventus, and pressured to step down as Italy coach.

Throughout the 2006 World Cup, Lippi was praised for rotating several players (fielding 21) and adopting several tactical systems that allowed his two star playmakers, Francesco Totti and Andrea Pirlo, to play alongside each other and contribute to Italy's offensive play, assisting many of the team's goals, eventually settling on a 4–2–3–1 formation. In Lippi's formation, Totti occupied the advanced creative role behind the main forward, in particular target-man Luca Toni, while Pirlo was deployed in the deep-lying playmaking role; the two players were supported defensively by hard-working box-to-box midfielders, such as Daniele De Rossi, Gennaro Gattuso, Simone Perrotta and Simone Barone, as well as winger Mauro Camoranesi, and attacking full-backs Gianluca Zambrotta and Fabio Grosso, who were expected to push up the flanks. In particular, the Pirlo–Gattuso partnership in Italy's midfield proved to be extremely effective, as Lippi led Italy all the way to the final of the tournament, where they beat France 5–3 in a penalty shoot-out after a 1–1 draw. While the team was praised for adopting a more offensive approach than Lippi's predecessors, which saw a World Cup record of ten of the team's 23 players score, with the squad netting 12 goals in total, the team also stood out for its defensive stability. Led by captain and eventual 2006 Ballon d'Or winner Fabio Cannavaro, Italy's back-line and goalkeeper – Gianluigi Buffon – only conceded two goals throughout the tournament, of which only one (an own goal) occurred in open play.

After winning the World Cup, Lippi stated that this was his "most satisfying moment as a coach", even after winning the Intercontinental Cup and the UEFA Champions League with Juventus. Three days after the final, Lippi did not renew his expiring contract with the Italian Football Federation (FIGC), and left his office as coach of Italy, citing insults to himself and his son. He was succeeded by Roberto Donadoni. Following his stint as Italy's manager, Lippi served as a commentator for 2007–08 UEFA Champions League matches for Sky Sport. Under the management of Donadoni, Italy was eliminated at UEFA Euro 2008 at the quarter-final stage by Spain on penalties, prompting Donadoni's dismissal. On 26 June 2008, Lippi was re-appointed as coach of Italy. Italy took part in the 2009 FIFA Confederations Cup under Lippi, where they suffered a first-round elimination following a 3–0 loss to Brazil in their final group match. Later that same year, Italy qualified for the 2010 World Cup with two games to spare following a 2–2 away draw against Ireland on 10 October. For the 2010 World Cup, Lippi selected mostly veterans of the victorious 2006 squad, controversially omitting younger players such as Mario Balotelli and Giuseppe Rossi, in addition to notable players such as Antonio Cassano. Italy's performance at the 2010 World Cup was extremely poor, drawing 1–1 with both Paraguay and New Zealand before losing 3–2 to Slovakia and finishing bottom of the group. Lippi resigned after the Slovakia defeat, and was succeeded by Cesare Prandelli. Lippi was also criticised by pundits for playing several players out of position in a 4–2–3–1 formation that he had not used in the lead-up to the tournament.

=== Guangzhou Evergrande ===
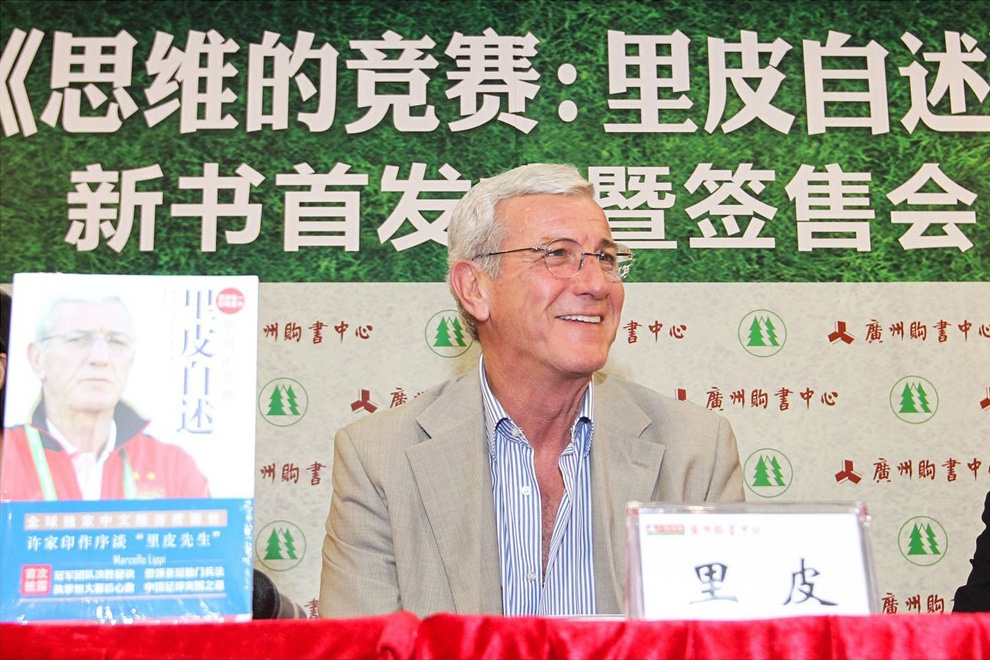
Lippi in 2014

On 17 May 2012, Chinese Super League side Guangzhou Evergrande announced that they had officially signed Lippi on a two-and-a-half-year deal worth around €30 million, replacing Korean manager Lee Jang-soo. Lippi's first official game in China came three days later on 20 May, in a 1–0 home victory against Qingdao Jonoon. He achieved a double in his first season at the club by winning the league and domestic cup titles. In his second season, on 2 October 2013, Lippi led his side to the 2013 AFC Champions League final for the first time in the club's history. Four days later, on 6 October, he led Guangzhou Evergrande to win their third consecutive Chinese Super League title by beating Shandong Luneng Taishan 4–2 away. In the final of the 2013 AFC Champions League, his side defeated FC Seoul to win the club's first Asian title, the first continental title for a Chinese club for 23 years.

Guangzhou Evergrande was later defeated in the two-legged final by Guizhou Moutai in the Chinese FA Cup, hence unable to become the first Chinese club to achieve a continental treble. Later that year, Lippi also led the club to a fourth-place finish in the 2013 FIFA Club World Cup. On 28 February 2014, Guangzhou Evergrande announced that they had officially extended Lippi's contract on a three-year deal, keeping him at the club until 2017. On 2 November 2014, Lippi publicly declared that he had retired from coaching after having guided Guangzhou Evergrande to their fourth successive league title. He continued with Guangzhou as the director of football. However, he resigned from the club on 26 February 2015.

=== China national team and return ===
On 22 October 2016, Lippi, was appointed manager of the China national team. He made his debut in a 0–0 draw against Qatar valid for the 2018 World Cup qualification. Lippi led the side during the final stage of the 2019 AFC Asian Cup, where China won 2–1 over Kyrgyzstan and 3–0 against Philippines, before losing 2–0 to group leaders South Korea on 16 January. China then beat Thailand 2–1 to earn a place in the quarter-finals, where the Chinese team was knocked out by Iran after a 3–0 defeat on 24 January; Lippi subsequently confirmed his departure as head coach. On 24 May 2019, Marcello Lippi was re-appointed as head coach of China, replacing compatriot Fabio Cannavaro after his brief tenure. He resigned for the second time that year on 15 November, following a 2–1 defeat to Syria. On 22 October 2020, Lippi announced his retirement from coaching.

== Coaching philosophy and management style ==
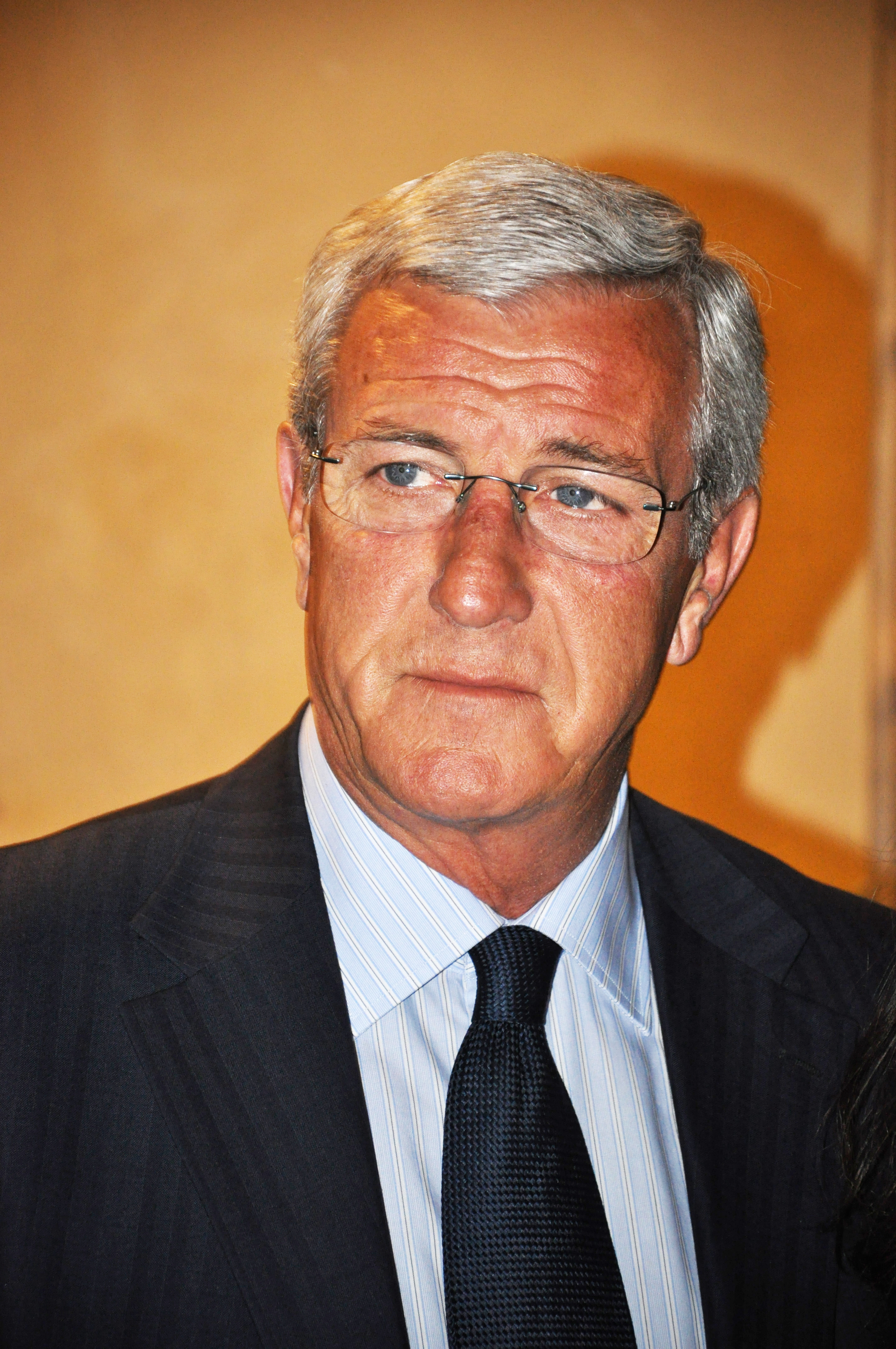
Lippi at the 2010 International Journalism Festival in Perugia

In his book Il Gioco delle Idee: Pensieri e Passioni da Bordo Campo (A Game of Ideas: Thoughts and Passions from the Sidelines), Lippi outlined his coaching philosophy. He emphasizes the importance of team spirit and unity. He likens a psychologically well integrated team to the functioning of a psychologically healthy family. On the strategic aspect of coaching, he emphasizes the importance of mutual relations between players. Players must all follow the same plan and play for each other, "not" for themselves. Lippi argues that "a group of the best players do not necessarily make for the best team". What is more important, he argues, is that the tactical plan or formation is one that allows each player to maximize (1) his utility for his teammates and (2) the expression of his full potential. Lippi also sat the choice of tactical formation is constrained by the qualities of the team's players. Thus selecting the best possible team not only requires finding the right combination of players for the chosen formation, but also finding the right formation for the chosen players.

Regarded as one of the best and most successful managers of all time, in 2013, James Horncastle, while writing for ESPN, described Lippi has a coaching style and tactical prowess with the following words: "[His] coaching education is broader than most. He worked before, during and after the revolution brought by Arrigo Sacchi. So think of him as a bridge between the old gioco all’italiana and the new, a blend of the traditional and the modern. His teams knew how to man-mark and to play zone. They invited opponents onto them and counterattacked but could also take the game to whoever they were playing and press them in their half of the pitch. Balance was everything. Lippi's starting XIs were never fixed. They were always in discussion and would be adapted according to the opposition." In the early part of his managerial career, Salvatore Lo Presti noted that Lippi was known for implementing an energetic and offensive style, which used a zonal marking system in defence; throughout his time at Juventus, he frequently used a high defensive line and the offside trap, with Peruzzi and subsequently Buffon acting as sweeper-keepers, while he used heavy pressing off the ball, with the team's forwards being the first line of defence, putting pressure on their opponents.

Lippi was also noted for his versatility as a manager. In 2017, Nicky Bandini also noted in an article for FourFourTwo that Lippi switched from his initial 4–3–3 system to a 4–4–2 formation to better accommodate the arrival of French offensive playmaker Zinedine Zidane at Juventus during the 1996–97 season; he was ultimately given licence to operate in a free role between the lines. Lippi also went on to use the 4–3–1–2 and 3–4–1–2 formations to better suit Zidane's playing style; he had also used the former formation during the 1994–95 season when Baggio was fit, as he was less suited to the 4–3–3. At Inter, Lippi used a fluid 3–3–1–3 formation, which would often become a 3–5–2. During his second spell at Juventus, he used a fluid 4–4–2 formation, with Pavel Nedvěd acting as a left winger on paper, who would frequently cut inside and move into the centre to shoot on goal, or operate in a creative role behind the forwards as an attacking midfielder, while he would also cover for the full-backs defensively. During the 2002–03 season, in order to accommodate the club's new right winger Camoranesi into the team's starting line-up, Lippi successfully shifted Zambrotta to a left-sided full-back role, due to his ability to overlap, run down the flank, provide width, cross into the box, or even cut inside and shoot on goal himself with his stronger foot.

In 1999, several journalists of La Gazzetta dello Sport praised Lippi for his charismatic leadership during his time with Juventus. Several of the club's former midfielders under Lippi went on to become managers, and have cited Lippi as an influence; these include Didier Deschamps, Paulo Sousa, Antonio Conte, and Zinedine Zidane. Lippi's perceived career rival, Manchester United manager Sir Alex Ferguson, also admired Lippi's coaching style. Similarly, during Italy's victorious 2006 World Cup campaign, Lippi was praised for adopting several tactical systems that allowed his two star playmakers, Francesco Totti and Andrea Pirlo, to play alongside one other. He eventually settlied on a 4–2–3–1 formation, in which Totti occupied the advanced creative role behind the centre-forward, while Pirlo was deployed in the deep-lying playmaking role; the two players were supported defensively by hard-working wingers and box-to-box midfielders, as well as attacking full-backs, who provided width to the team. The team also drew praise for its defensive solidity. World Soccer magazine also noted that Lippi's tactical flexibility throughout the tournament was further demonstrated by the fact that he often changed formations throughout the course of a single match, in addition to rotating players. Indeed, the fluidity of the team's formation was based on the movement and work-rate of the wide midfielders, who were required both to push up and track back. Lippi's system saw the players adopt more of a 4–4–1–1 or 4–4–2 formation when defending off the ball, which then became a more offensive 4–2–3–1 system when in possession, with the wide midfielders acting as attacking wingers, in particular Camoranesi on the right. Perrotta was instead used in a more defensive wide role on the left, to help reinforce the midfield, due to his work-rate.

In 2016, manager Antonio Conte praised Lippi for his coaching skills and tactical prowess, as well as his ability to communicate with and motivate his players to foster a competitive team spirit and a winning mentality; he also went on to describe his experiences as a player under Lippi with Juventus stating: "I remember when Marcello Lippi arrived from Napoli with great ambition and determination. He was very important, as he was able to transmit to us precisely what he wanted. We hit rock bottom with defeat to Foggia, so Lippi said if we have to lose, we'll go down fighting. From then on we attacked, pressed high and took the game to the opposition. Lippi was excellent at motivating the squad and passing on his ideas. I think the most important thing for a Coach is to have a clear vision and transmit that clearly to his players. Lippi always had that, as well as a great ability to motivate us, even when we played every three days. That Juventus had four consecutive European Finals and if you think back, that was an exceptional achievement." Fabrizio Ravanelli, who, like Conte, played under Lippi at Juventus, has also praised Lippi, describing him as a manager who excelled at reading the game and motivating his players. In 2001, former footballer Roberto Baggio, who had a difficult relationship with Lippi and was often critical of his former manager, noted in his autobiography – Una porta nel cielo – that he was impressed by the fact that Lippi also paid great attention to his players' diets, and to their athletic preparation, and always made use of the newest technologies and hired athletic coaches who used the most current training methods. During his early coaching career, Lippi was also known for smoking Mercator cigars while on the bench during matches.

== Managerial statistics ==
As of match played 7 July 2025

Managerial record by team and tenure
Team	Nat	From	To	Record							
Team	Nat	From	To	G	W	D	L	GF	GA	GD	Win %
Pontedera	(Italy)	1 June 1985	1 June 1986	34	10	17	7	27	24	+3	29.41
Siena	(Italy)	1 June 1986	1 June 1987	34	5	14	15	13	27	−14	14.71
Pistoiese	(Italy)	10 June 1987	7 June 1988	40	10	16	14	32	38	−6	25.00
Carrarese	(Italy)	7 June 1988	30 June 1989	46	16	21	9	41	31	+10	34.78
Cesena	(Italy)	30 June 1989	26 January 1991	55	10	21	24	47	78	−31	18.18
Lucchese	(Italy)	20 June 1991	15 June 1992	42	9	22	11	38	38	+0	21.43
Atalanta	(Italy)	15 June 1992	8 June 1993	36	15	8	13	44	47	−3	41.67
Napoli	(Italy)	8 June 1993	30 June 1994	36	12	13	11	43	38	+5	33.33
Juventus	(Italy)	30 June 1994	8 February 1999	244	137	65	42	418	217	+201	56.15
Inter Milan	(Italy)	30 June 1999	3 October 2000	51	25	11	15	90	57	+33	49.02
Juventus	(Italy)	17 June 2001	28 May 2004	161	90	39	32	294	166	+128	55.90
Italy	(Italy)	16 July 2004	12 July 2006	29	17	10	2	45	19	+26	58.62
Italy	(Italy)	26 June 2008	25 June 2010	27	11	11	5	38	28	+10	40.74
Guangzhou Evergrande	(China)	17 May 2012	2 November 2014	126	82	23	21	281	121	+160	65.08
China	(China)	22 October 2016	25 January 2019	30	10	9	11	35	41	−6	33.33
China	(China)	24 May 2019	14 November 2019	7	5	1	1	20	3	+17	71.43
Total				998	464	301	233	1,506	973	+533	46.49

== Honours ==
=== Manager ===
Juventus

- Serie A: 1994–95, 1996–97, 1997–98, 2001–02, 2002–03
- Coppa Italia: 1994–95
- Supercoppa Italiana: 1995, 1997, 2002, 2003
- UEFA Champions League: 1995–96; runner-up: 1996–97, 1997–98, 2002–03
- UEFA Cup runner-up: 1994–95
- UEFA Super Cup: 1996
- Intercontinental Cup: 1996

Guangzhou Evergrande

- Chinese Super League: 2012, 2013, 2014
- Chinese FA Cup: 2012
- AFC Champions League: 2013

Italy

- FIFA World Cup: 2006

Individual

- UEFA Club Coach of the Year : 1997–98
- Serie A Coach of the Year: 1997, 1998, 2003
- Panchina d'Oro (2): 1994–95, 1995–96, 2006 (Special Award)
- IFFHS World's Best National Coach: 2006
- IFFHS World's Best Club Coach: 1996, 1998
- Onze d'Or Coach of the Year: 1997
- World Soccer World Manager of the Year: 2006
- Excellence Guirlande D'Honneur by the FICTS
- Italian Football Hall of Fame: 2011
- Chinese Football Association Coach of the Year: 2013
- World Soccer 13th Greatest Manager of All Time: 2013
- ESPN 15th Greatest Manager of All Time: 2013
- France Football 16th Greatest Manager of All Time: 2019
- FourFourTwo 13th Greatest Manager of All Time: 2023
- Globe Soccer Coach Career Award: 2017
- Golden Foot Award Legends: 2018

=== Orders ===
- CONI: Golden Palm of Technical Merit: Palma d'oro al Merito Tecnico: 2006

- 3rd Class / Commander: Commendatore Ordine al Merito della Repubblica Italiana: 2006

=== Records ===
- First Coach to win both UEFA Champions League and World Cup
- First Coach to win both UEFA Champions League and AFC Champions League
- Lippi and Vicente del Bosque are the only two Coaches to have won both World Cup and UEFA Champions League
- Coach with the most runners-up medals in UEFA Champions League (tied with Jurgen Klopp): 3 (all with Juventus)
- Coach with the most runners-up medals in European Competitions: 4 (all with Juventus)
- Coach with second most Serie A titles: 5 (all with Juventus)
- Second longest serving coach for Juventus: 405 matches
- Second longest serving coach for a single club in Serie A: 405 matches with Juventus

== Bibliography ==
- Marcello Lippi, Il gioco delle idee: pensieri e passioni a bordo campo, Editrice San Raffaele, 2008. ISBN 88-86270-71-2 ("A game of ideas: thoughts and passions from the sidelines").
