= David Zonana =

Mexican filmmaker (born 1989)

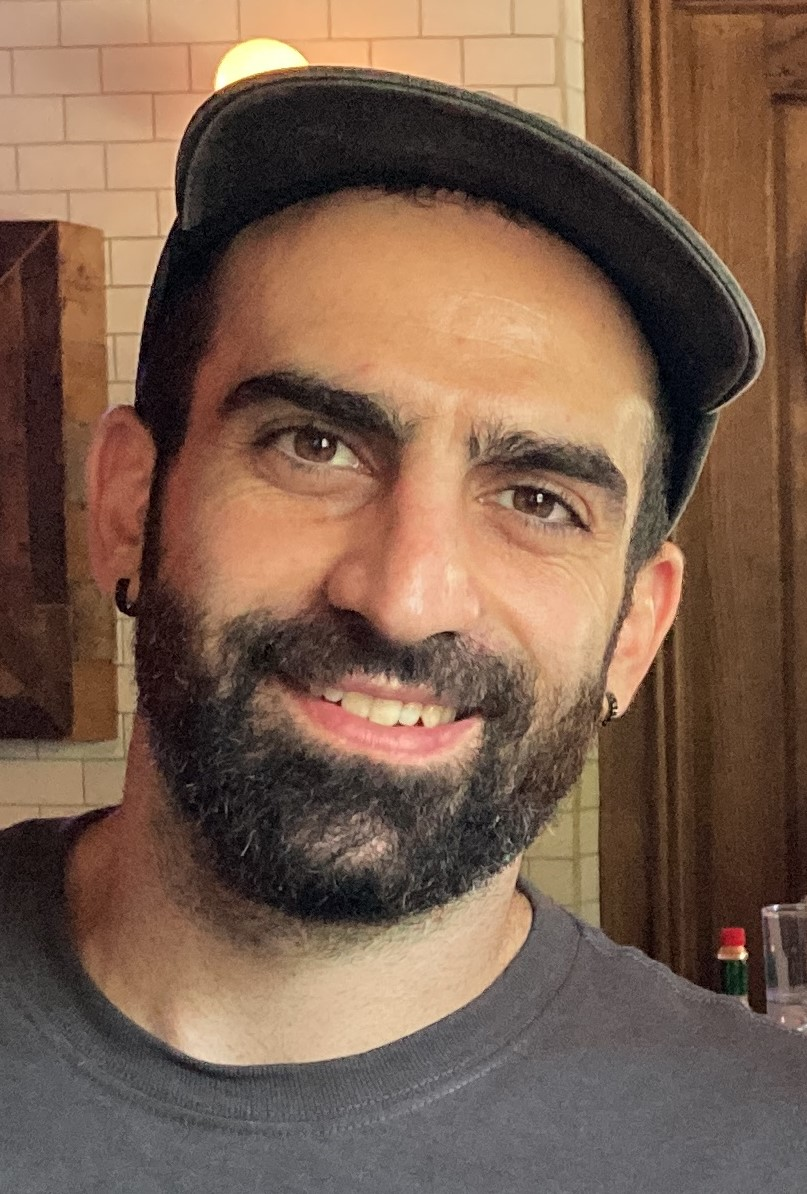
- Zonana in 2023.
- Born: David Zonana Smeke; 22 November 1989 (age 35); Mexico City
- Occupations: Film director; producer; screenwriter
- Years active: 2014–present

David Zonana (born 22 November 1989) is a Mexican filmmaker known for his films regarding social issues, primarily featuring amateur actors. Zonana has directed several short films and two feature films, Workforce (Mano de obra) in 2019 and Heroic (Heroico) in 2023, which have received critical acclaim.

Zonana has premiered his films at several international film festivals, including those of Berlin, Sundance Film Festival, San Sebastián, Toronto, and Morelia and has won the Ariel Award for Best First Feature Film for Workforce in 2020. His second film, Heroico, about the training process of Mexican Army recruits, received 11 nominations for the Ariel Awards including Best Picture, Best Director and Best Original Screenplay for Zonana.

== Early life and background ==
David Zonana Smeke was born in Mexico City on 22 November 1989. He explored poetry, photography, painting and music before pursuing a career in finance. He then abandoned his studies, seeking to travel to South America and planning on surviving by playing music in bars. "It was a dark period, I did not know what to do and just wandered around, ruminating on a thousand topics. But it was interesting to give myself that space for introspection to understand what my place was in the world", he stated to El Financiero.

Around that time he met filmmaker Michel Franco, who was about to premiere his film Después de Lucía (2012) at the Cannes Film Festival. "I guess he saw some potential and invited me to work at his production company. I had nothing to lose," Zonana said of his relationship with Franco. After some time working as an assistant and on-set supervisor for Lucía Films, Franco urged him to start watching films, "he took me to a movie store and bought me about 40 films, two by Truffaut, two by Bergman, two by Kubrick, two by Kurosawa, among others. There were films I had to watch again years later because I didn't understand them back then.”

== Film career ==
=== Work as producer and short film director ===
From 2013 to 2017, serving as an in-house producer at Michel Franco's production company, Zonana alternated between production responsibilities and short film writing and directing. Zonana's debut as director came in 2015 with a self-written short film, Princesa, about a victim of sexual abuse and her aftermath discovering another side of herself. The film was shot in Zonana's family home using a borrowed camera from his office; due to budget constraints, Zonana's mother doubled as an actress, marking his first experience working with non-professional actors. It debuted at the Morelia International Film Festival along the feature film Los Herederos, produced by him. For Rafael Aviña of Reforma, the former "takes an almost documentary distance in a case of sexual abuse and its consequences", and the latter observed "with clinical precision" the "insolence, impudence and emotional abandonment that catapults violence" of the children and adolescents from the most privileged social classes.

The same year, Zonana was credited as associate producer of 600 Millas, the first feature film by Gabriel Ripstein. The film was selected to represent Mexico at the 88th Academy Awards in the Best Foreign Language Film category. Zonana also co-produced Chronic, written and directed by Michel Franco, which premiered at the Cannes Film Festival. Sangre Alba (2016) was Zonana's second short film. It starred Naian González Norvind and Darío Yazbek Bernal and was selected for several film festivals, including Guanajuato, Morelia, New Orleans and Indie Grits. In 2017, he served as an executive producer of Las Hijas de Abril (2017), a feature film again written and directed by Michel Franco. It debuted in the Un Certain Regard section at the 2017 Cannes Film Festival, where it won the Jury Prize. Later that year, Zonana wrote and directed his third short film, Hermano, which premiered at the Morelia Film Festival and starred Humberto Busto. Regarding his early directing work, Zonana commented: "I did not study film, so even though the shorts may have some technical and narrative issues, they served as a way of learning and understanding myself as an auteur."

=== Feature film debut with Workforce ===
Fed up with film producing, Zonana left Lucía Films to write the screenplay of his first feature film, Workforce (Mano de obra). In the film, Francisco (Luis Alberti), a construction worker, learns that his widowed sister-in-law will not receive any compensation after his brother dies while working on a luxurious house. The fight for justice, combined with other incidents involving his coworkers, leads him to head an uprising which ends with the workers taking possession of the house. Zonana filmed in a house at the upscale neighborhood Jardines del Pedregal and in Jalalpa, an impoverished borough of Mexico City where the real bricklayers that joined the cast lived. "The contrasts are natural, we move back and forth from a big luxurious house to the place where the workers who served in the film as actors live, showing a much lower standard of living in terms of dignity and basic needs... with the exception of the protagonist, they are all real bricklayers, which gave an interesting and comedic turn. They are very funny and have interesting dynamics that gave a spark of realism to the film," Zonana told La Jornada.

Workforce premiered in the Platform Prize program at the Toronto Film Festival, and was later screened at the 2019 San Sebastián International Film Festival where it competed for the Golden Shell. The same year, the film was selected for the Zurich and London film festivals. At the end of that year, the film was exhibited at the Morelia Film Festival, an important event for the director since "the Mexican public is always the priority", Zonana stated to Proceso. Mexican review aggregator website Tomatazos reported a 90-percent approval rating based on 20 reviews with a critical consensus that reads: "The story subverts expectations and creates a vibrant portrait of corruption and the nature with which we move through it." At the 62nd Ariel Awards, the director received two nominations for the film, Best Original Screenplay and Best First Feature Film, winning the latter.

=== Exposing the Mexican Army in Heroico ===
In the film there is a social layer that, obviously, has to do with the lack of opportunities for thousands of young people who enter the institution of the military out of necessity. There is also a layer of Mexican identity, and of course, a layer of violence, of psychological deformation, which is a consequence of the process they go through: the transformation from innocent young boys into men who have the capacity to kill. Reality is complex and I think the film had to acknowledge that.

— David Zonana, in an interview with El País

While editing Workforce, Zonana began writing the first draft for his following film, Heroico, with a plot following a first-year cadet at an unnamed school resembling the Heroic Military Academy, the training center for officers of the Mexican Army. Filming took place at the Otomí Ceremonial Center and Tenango del Aire, Tecamachalco, Naucalpan, in the State of Mexico. In order to write the script, Zonana collected testimonies from people with experience in the military, some still active and others who had deserted the armed forces. The actor who became the lead performer of the film, Santiago Sandoval, was found in one of these interviews. The majority of the cast is made up of young people with military experience, while the antagonist is played by Mexican actor Fernando Cuautle.

As a consequence of the Army being extremely hermetic, with very limited access to inside information, Zonana pursued realism, since "Today more than ever, Mexico finds itself deeply attached to the military world. Approaching this subjects taking liberties was not an option, as it would be irresponsible for the first film that sheds light upon the most powerful and secretive institution in the country, to be fallacious." After releasing the trailer, the subject of the film became highly controversial amongst general public, media personalities and politicians. President Andrés Manuel López Obrador denounced a smear campaign against the institution of the military, while others, such as opposition figure and journalist Carlos Loret de Mola, utilized the trending topic to criticize the armed forces, releasing a series of real-life self recorded videos by cadets that exposed the brutality of life inside the military.

Heroico premiered at the 2023 Sundance Film Festival and in the Panorama Section of the 73rd Berlin International Film Festival. Reviewing the Sundance World Dramatic competition, Robert Daniels of RogerEbert.com declared the film as "the boldest swing against an institution that we’ve seen in quite some time". The film premiered in Mexico at the 38th Guadalajara International Film Festival, where it won the Mezcal Award for Best Mexican Feature Film, as well as the Youth Jury and FIPRESCI accolades. On 21 September 2023, Heroico was distributed in Mexican theaters by Cinépolis Distribución on 500 screens. It ended 2023 as the sixth most-watched Mexican film in the country with 480,000 attendees and grossed MXN$31,825,000. Zonana received nominations for Best Picture and Best Director at the 19th CANACINE awards for Heroico. Furthermore, Heroico received 11 nominations for the Ariel Awards including Best Picture, Best Director and Best Original Screenplay for Zonana.

== Further work as a writer ==
In an interview, Zonana stated that writing is the aspect of filmmaking he enjoys the most. As a result, after Heroico, he started writing a novel. "I do not really like dealing with so many people, I know I can do it, but I must be honest with myself and take a break every once in a while. Looking back, what I most enjoyed about making both of my films was writing the script," he explained to El Financiero. The novel will also deal with social issues, as did with his previous work.

== Filmography ==
Year	Film	Director	Producer	Writer	Notes
2015	Princesa	Yes	Yes	Yes	Short film
2015	600 Miles (600 Millas)		Yes		
2015	Chronic		Yes		
2015	Los Herederos		Yes		
2016	Sangre Alba	Yes	Yes	Yes	Short film
2017	April's Daughter (Las Hijas de Abril)		Yes		
2017	Hermano	Yes	Yes	Yes	Short film
2019	Workforce (Mano de obra)	Yes	Yes	Yes	Ariel Award for Best First Feature Film; Gothenburg Film Festival Ingmar Bergman International Debut; Zurich Film Festival for Best Director; Nominated – Ariel Award for Best Original Screenplay; Nominated – Golden Shell San Sebastián International Film Festival
2023	Heroic (Heroico)	Yes	Yes	Yes	Guadalajara Film Festival Mezcal Award for Best Mexican Feature Film; Nominated – Ariel Award for Best Picture; Nominated – Ariel Award for Best Director; Nominated – Ariel Award for Best Original Screenplay; Nominated – CANACINE Award for Best Director; Nominated – CANACINE Award for Best Picture
