= Counterstrike =

Counterstrike may refer to:

- Counter-Strike, a video game series
  - Counter-Strike (video game), a 2000 modification of the video game Half-Life
  - Counter-Strike: Condition Zero, a 2004 video game
  - Counter-Strike: Source, a 2004 video game
  - Counter-Strike: Global Offensive, a 2012 video game
  - Counter-Strike 2, a 2023 video game
- Counterstrike, an expansion pack for the video game Command & Conquer: Red Alert
- "Counterstrike", a season 10 Stargate SG-1 episode
- Counterstrike (1969 TV series)
- Counterstrike (1990 TV series)
- Counterstrike (2025 film)
- Counterstrike (drum and bass group)
- "Counterstrike", a song by Sabaton from Primo Victoria, 2005
- "Counterstrike the Mp3", a song by Basshunter from The Old Shit, 2006

== See also ==
- Counterattack (disambiguation)
- Second strike
