= Raúl Sandoval =

Mexican actor and singer

Edwin Raul Sandoval de la Torre (born January 5, 1979, in Mexicali, Baja California) is a Mexican actor and singer. Known by his stage name Raúl, he is best known by being in the first generation of La Academia, (Mexican version of American Idol), produced by TV Azteca.

== Early years ==
Raul Sandoval was born on January 5, 1979, in Mexicali, Baja California. His father is Raul Alfonso Sandoval Dorame and his mother Ana Berta Araceli Tapia de la Torre. He has a brother named Erick. At the Federal Secondary 5, Raúl was part of a musical group called Banda Lobo as a vocalist. With that group performances were organized in local nightclubs and on one occasion they were invited and sponsored by the "Group Feroz" to participate in the "Festival of the Sun" that are made each year in Mexicali. At 17 years old he joined the chorus of the parish of Mount Caramel and made a show imitating Alejandro Fernandez. In 1999 he won first place in the competitions "Cultural Oaxtepec Games" and "Sing and Win".

== La Academia ==
In 2002, Raúl was one of the 14 participants in the first generation of La Academia, a Mexican reality musical talent show. In La Academia, he was distinguished by singing rancheras and mariachi songs. His romance with María Inés earned him the nickname "The Cachanilla of love." Among his best-known songs during his stay in La Academia are "Cause of women like you" [Por Mujeres Como Tu], "It Wasn't Me" [Yo No Fui] and "Granada", which however failed to be among the finalists. Raúl finished La Academia at seventh place.

== Later career ==
After La Academia, Raúl participated in "Two Guys to be Aware of," [Dos Chicos De Cuidado] along with fellow La Academia member and friend Victor Garcia. In 2003 he participated in Desafio de Estrellas [Star Challenge], where he had the opportunity to record his album. In its second production involving Pepe Aguilar, Jose M. Figueroa, Mario Quintero among others, recorded in various studios and with producers such as Pepe Aguilar, Fernando de Santiago, both in Los Angeles and Tijuana.

He has recorded four solo albums, and a compilation of his history in the Academy making it 5 albums in total. "Serenade" [Serenata], "Sorry, because" [Perdon, Porque] with partners such as Pepe Aguilar, Jose Manuel Figueroa, Fernando Santiago, Mario Quintero, Jorge Avendano and others. His fourth production "The Challenge of a Star" [El Desafio De Una Estrella] is a collection of songs that played during La Academia and the Challenge of Stars I and II, where he won Third Place after 25 concerts every Sunday. He is currently promoting his fifth album "My Other Way" and performing his personal shows throughout Mexico; his manager is Patricia Grijalva.

== Singles ==
- Serenata (Serenata)
- El Enyerbado (Serenata)
- Perdon Porque (Perdon Porque)
- Golpe de Timon (Perdon Porque)
- Fuerte No Soy (El Desafio de Una Estrella)
- Como Yo te Amo (El Desafio de Una Estralla)
- Que Bonitos Ojos tienes (Mi Otro Camino)
- Besos (Mi Otro Camino)
- Ajenos (Mi Otro Camino)
- Como No pensar en Ti (Mi Otro Camino)
- Urge (Animo Raza)

== Discography ==
=== Studio albums ===
- 2002: Raúl en La Academia
- 2003: Serenata (Oro)
- 2005: Raúl Sandoval
- 2006: El desafío de una estrella
- 2007: Mi otro camino
- 2011: Ánimo raza
- 2023: Abeja reina
- 2024: Dime que vas a volver

=== Singles ===
- 2019: ¿Quién será?
- 2021: Flores a la virgen
- 2022: Mentira tras mentiras
- 2023: Sin volver a verte
- 2023: El 7 crudas
- 2023: Chiquilla mi reina
- 2023: Cállate
- 2023: Abeja reina
- 2024: Dime que vas a volver

== Television ==
- La Academia Primera Generación (2002) - Participante (7.° lugar)
- Desafio de estrellas (2003) - Participante (6.° lugar)
- Homenaje a (2003) - Participante
- Dos chicos de cuidado en la ciudad (2003) - Raúl Chávez Rodríguez
- Los Sánchez (2004) - Invitado
- Desafío de estrellas 2 (2006) - Participante
- Lo que callamos las mujeres (2008, 2009) Episodios: Un traje a la medida y Limites
- El gran desafío de estrellas (2009) - Participante
- Los Rey (2012) - Gervasio
- Siempre tuya Acapulco (2014) - Anastasio "Tacho" Cárdenas
- Jenni Rivera: Mariposa de barrio - (2017) - Lupillo Rivera
- Bronco: La serie (2019) - Ramiro Delgado
- El minuto que cambió mi destino (2021) - Invitado
- Las estrellas bailan en Hoy (2021) - Participant
- Si nos dejan (2021) - "El Trece"
- Guerreros Mexico (2021) - Participante, equipo cobras
- El rey, Vicente Fernández (2022) - Felipe Arriaga
- Se llamaba Pedro Infante (2023) - Angel Infante
- MasterChef Celebrity México (2024) - Participante
- Cantadísimo (2025) - Juez
- Tentados por la fortuna (2025) - Participante, ganador
