= Fireflies (2018 international film) =

2018 international LGBTQ+ drama film

- Theatrical film poster
- Spanish: Luciérnagas
- Directed by: Bani Khoshnoudi
- Written by: Bani Khoshnoudi
- Produced by: Bani Khoshnoudi; Elsa Reyes
- Starring: Arash Marandi; Flor Edwarda Gurrola; Luis Alberti
- Cinematography: Benjamín Echazarreta
- Edited by: Gilberto González Penilla; Miguel Schverdfinger
- Music by: Sohrab Karimi
- Release dates: October 21, 2018 (Morelia); December 6, 2019 (Mexico)
- Running time: 88 minutes
- Countries: Mexico; United States; Greece; Dominican Republic
- Languages: Spanish; English; Persian

Fireflies (Spanish: Luciérnagas) is a 2018 international LGBTQ+ drama film, directed by Bani Khoshnoudi. The film stars Arash Marandi, Flor Edwarda Gurrola, and Luis Alberti. It premiered at the Morelia International Film Festival in 2018, before being released throughout Mexico the following year.

== Synopsis ==
Ramin flees from persecution in Iran and ends up living in the limbo of exile, far from everything he knows, in the tropical port city of Veracruz, Mexico.

== Cast ==
- Arash Marandi as Ramin
- Luis Alberti as Guillermo
- Flor Edwarda Gurrola as Leti
- Eligio Meléndez as Jorge
- Eduardo Mendizábal as Ernesto
- Ishbel Bautista as Rosi
- Miguel González Bello as Brian

== Reception ==
Jonathan Holland of The Hollywood Reporter called the film: "A sensitive and slow-moving study about three suffering, displaced souls in search of better times in Mexico, [the film] is indeed as melancholy as it sounds." Erik Estrada of Cinegarage commended the filmmaker: "Koshmoudi fitfully manages to portray a significant connection between two people, without having to force the romantic element now plaguing Mexican cinema."

Matthew Sorrento of Film International praised the film: "[The film] is another admirable achievement by an Iranian diaspora filmmaker." Zachary Wild of The Rectangular View rated the film 4.5/5 stars, and lauded it: "[This film] is an interesting film about acceptance and happiness. Instead of being heavy-handed and taking sides, it trusts that the audience will follow along and come to their own conclusions. The setting is realistic, which works well with the overall tone, and the acting is decent."
