= Bronco: The Series =

Biographical TV series based on the Mexican group Bronco

- Spanish: Bronco: La serie
- Genre: Biographical
- Created by: Diego Alvarez
- Based on: Cicatrices de un corazón Bronco by José Guadalupe Esparza
- Directed by: Max Zunino; Conrado Martínez
- Country of origin: Mexico
- Original language: Spanish
- No. of seasons: 1
- No. of episodes: 13

Production
- Executive producer: Julio de Rose
- Production locations: Mexico City; Hidalgo, Mexico; Nuevo Leon, Mexico; United States
- Camera setup: Multi-camera
- Production companies: Turner Latin America; Plataforma; Comarex

Original release
- Network: TNT Latin America
- Release: 24 September – 17 December 2019

Bronco: The Series (Spanish: Bronco: La serie), is a Spanish-language biographical television series produced by Turner Latin America, Plataforma, and Comarex. The series is based on the history of Regional Mexican band Bronco, and in turn is an adaptation of the book Cicatrices de un corazón Bronco by José Guadalupe Esparza. The series is premiered on 24 September 2019 on TNT Latin America, and 3 October 2019 via streaming services on Claro Video. In the US, the series was released on Pantaya on 11 March 2021.

== Plot ==
Four musicians who start from nothing, try to earn a place in a heartless industry overcoming discrimination and poverty to reach the top. There they discover that on the road to success they lost the most valuable: the reins of their lives and the love of their families. The group will have to go down from the top to try to recover it.

== Cast ==
- Luis Alberti as José Guadalupe "Lupe" Esparza
- Yigael Yadin as José Luis "Choche" Villarreal
- Baltimore Beltrán as Javier Villarreal
- Raúl Sandoval as Ramiro Delgado
- Luis Felipe Tovar as Homero Hernández
- Mayra Sérbulo as Ausencia
- Hernán Mendoza as Fermín Ordoñez
- Betty Monroe as Belén
- Martha Claudia Moreno as Conchita
- Michael Ronda as Eduardo
- Florencia Ríos as Martha Benavidez
- Pablo Astiazarán as Eric Garza
- Javier Escobar

== Production ==
The series is created by Julio Geiger, based on the book Cicatrices de un corazón Bronco, is produced by Julio de Rose and directed by Max Zunino, and Conrado Martínez who also interpret two musical themes in each episode of the series. To interpret José Guadalupe Esparza, Luis Alberti said he was inspired more than anything in his songs than in his book to know his personality. Betty Monroe plays Belén Mendoza, the first public relations advisor of the band that in real life was Blanca Martínez, La Chicuela. Yigael Yadin to play Choche, had to learn to play drums and also gain 22 kilos. He also confirmed that the series will not touch topics such as alcoholism, drugs, lawsuits or disunity.

The series was recorded almost entirely in Mexico, specifically in Mexico City, Nuevo Leon, and Hidalgo and another part in the United States.
