= Workforce (film) =

2019 Mexican drama film

- Film poster
- Spanish: Mano de obra
- Directed by: David Zonana
- Written by: David Zonana
- Produced by: Michel Franco; David Zonana; Erendira Nunez Larios
- Starring: Luis Alberti; Yessica Galvez
- Cinematography: Carolina Costa
- Edited by: Óscar Figueroa
- Production company: Lucia Films
- Distributed by: Piano; Cinépolis
- Release date: September 9, 2019 (TIFF)
- Running time: 82 minutes
- Country: Mexico
- Language: Spanish

Workforce (Spanish: Mano de obra) is a 2019 Mexican drama film directed by David Zonana. The film centres on Francisco (Luis Alberti), a construction worker who learns that his widowed sister-in-law Lupe (Yessica Galvez) will not receive any compensation after his brother dies while working on a luxurious house, and who takes revenge by squatting in the property.

The cast also includes Hugo Mendoza, Jonathan Sánchez, Horacio Celestino, Francisco Díaz, Arturo Somilleda, Ramiro Resendiz, Rodrigo Mendoza, Juan González, Norma Pablo, Karina Salazar, Joanna Isunza Martínez, Daniela Bueno, Damián Mendoza, Gudelia Carrillo, Alexandra Rodríguez, Julieta Hernandez and Ángel Colín in supporting roles.

== Distribution ==
The film premiered in the Platform Prize program at the 2019 Toronto International Film Festival. It was subsequently screened at the 2019 San Sebastián International Film Festival, where it competed for the Golden Shell.

== Critical response ==
Boyd van Hoeij of The Hollywood Reporter wrote that "This could sound like a kind of socialist revenge scheme, with the working classes profiting from the fruits of their labor to the detriment of those who hired and (mostly) paid them. But Zonana isn’t interested in such a simplistic resolution. Instead, he shows how even within the utopian ideal of the large, free house with several families, friction starts to occur and people try to take advantage of each other. Because today’s poor could be tomorrow’s millionaires and people with power and money can only retain and amplify those things by exploiting the folks beneath them. It’s a message that’s not particularly sophisticated, but the way it is sketched here, on this very modest scale, is convincing."

For Screen Daily, Wendy Ide wrote that "With its juxtaposition of lives of oblivious luxury against the hand to mouth vulnerability of the workers, the film explores similar territory to that of Lila Avilés’ The Chambermaid. And, for a while at least, it matches that film for meticulously constructed atmosphere. But while Avilés’ work burrowed deep under the skin of its central character, Workforce deliberately keeps Francesco at a mysterious distance, hinting at a darkness in his character which makes the audience wary about empathising with him wholly. He’s a cipher who reacts against the callousness of the privileged, only to start absorbing the same traits."

== Awards ==
Award	Date of ceremony	Category	Work	Result	Ref.
Ariel Awards	2020	Best Actor	Luis Alberti	Won	
Ariel Awards	2020	Best Original Screenplay	David Zonana	Nominated	
Ariel Awards	2020	Best First Work	David Zonana	Won	
