= Fabio Cannavaro =

Italian footballer (born 1973)

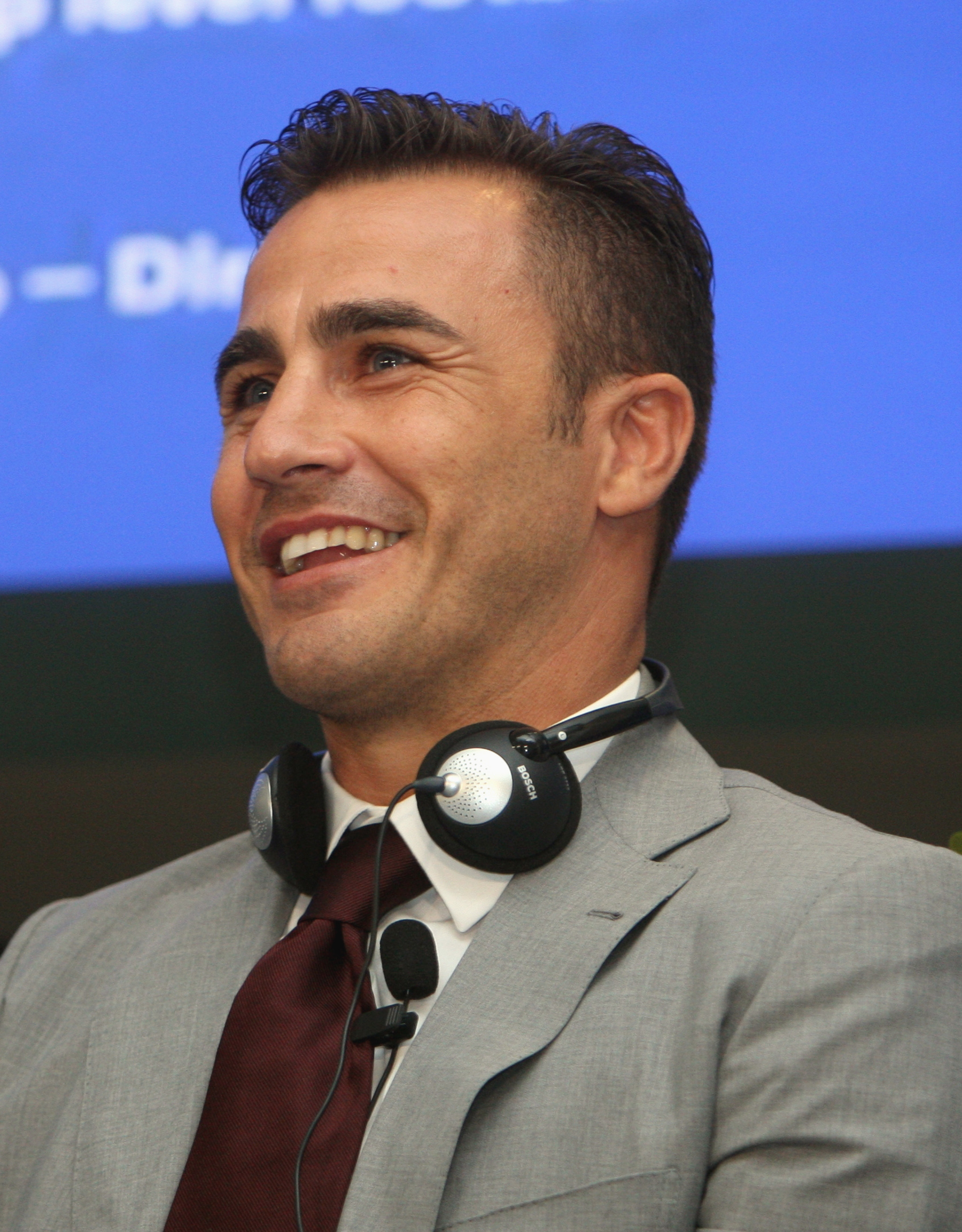
- Cannavaro in 2011

Personal information
- Full name: Fabio Cannavaro
- Date of birth: 13 September 1973 (age 53)
- Place of birth: Naples, Italy
- Height: 1.76 m (5 ft 9 in)
- Position: Centre-back

Team information
- Current team: Uzbekistan (head coach)

Youth career
- 1988–1992: Napoli

Senior career*
| Years | Team | Apps | (Gls) |
| 1991–1995 | Napoli | 58 | (1) |
| 1995–2002 | Parma | 212 | (5) |
| 2002–2004 | Inter Milan | 50 | (2) |
| 2004–2006 | Juventus | 74 | (6) |
| 2006–2009 | Real Madrid | 94 | (0) |
| 2009–2010 | Juventus | 27 | (0) |
| 2010–2011 | Al Ahli Dubai | 16 | (2) |
| Total | | 531 | (16) |

International career
| 1993–1996 | Italy U21 | 21 | (0) |
| 1997–2010 | Italy | 136 | (2) |

Managerial career
- 2014–2015: Guangzhou Evergrande
- 2015–2016: Al Nassr
- 2016–2017: Tianjin Quanjian
- 2017–2021: Guangzhou Evergrande
- 2019: China
- 2022–2023: Benevento
- 2024: Udinese
- 2024–2025: Dinamo Zagreb
- 2025–: Uzbekistan
Medal record
Men's football
Representing Italy
FIFA World Cup
| Winner | 2006 Germany |
UEFA European Championship
| Runner-up | 2000 Belgium-Netherlands |
UEFA European Under-21 Championship
| Winner | 1994 France |
| Winner | 1996 Spain |
- * Club domestic league appearances and goals

Fabio Cannavaro Ufficiale OMRI (Italian pronunciation: [ˈfaːbjo kannaˈvaːro]; born 13 September 1973) is an Italian professional football coach and former player who is the head coach of the Uzbekistan national team. He is regarded as one of the greatest defenders of all time.

A centre-back, he spent the majority of his career in Italy. He started his career at Napoli before spending seven years at Parma, with whom he won two Coppa Italia titles, the 1999 Supercoppa Italiana, and the 1999 UEFA Cup. After spells at Inter Milan and Juventus, he transferred (along with manager Fabio Capello) from Juventus to Real Madrid in 2006, with whom he won consecutive La Liga titles in 2007 and 2008. He returned to Juventus for one season in 2009–10 and retired from football in 2011 after a stint at Al-Ahli.

Cannavaro was part of the Italy team which won consecutive UEFA European Under-21 Championships in 1994 and 1996. After earning his first senior cap in 1997, he helped his national team to the final of UEFA Euro 2000, being named in the team of the tournament, and became captain in 2002, following Paolo Maldini's retirement.

Cannavaro led Italy to victory in the 2006 FIFA World Cup in Germany and was given the nickname "Il Muro di Berlino" ("The Berlin Wall") by the Italian supporters due to his defensive performances, which saw Italy keep five clean sheets and concede only two goals, neither of which were in open play. He was awarded the Silver Ball after being named the tournament's second-best player. He was named the 2006 FIFA World Player of the Year, making him the only defender in history to have won the award. He also won the Ballon d'Or award in 2006 which made him the only defender to win the award in a decade and only the third of all time after Franz Beckenbauer and Matthias Sammer.

In 2009, Cannavaro overtook Maldini as the most-capped player in the country's history. He retired from international football on 25 June 2010 following Italy's failure to qualify for the knockout stages of the 2010 World Cup, having amassed 136 caps and 2 goals for the senior national team. In total, he represented Italy at four World Cups, two UEFA European Championships, the 1996 Summer Olympics and the 2009 FIFA Confederations Cup. He is currently Italy's second all-time appearance holder, behind Gianluigi Buffon, as well as Italy's most capped defender.

Since his retirement, Cannavaro has coached different teams in Asia. He was briefly appointed as manager of the China national team in 2019. He was the head coach of Serie B club Benevento in the 2022–23 season, and in April 2024, he became head coach of Serie A club Udinese, successfully leading the club clear of the relegation zone. In December 2024, he was announced as the manager of Croatian club Dinamo Zagreb but dismissed four months later. In October 2025, he was appointed as the head coach of the Uzbekistan national team.

== Early life ==
Fabio Cannavaro was born in Naples to Gelsomina Costanzo and Pasquale Cannavaro. His mother worked as a maid, while his father was a bank clerk. His father also played football for provincial side Giugliano. He has an elder sister named Renata and a younger brother named Paolo, also a professional footballer.

== Club career ==
=== 1988–1995: Youth career and Napoli ===
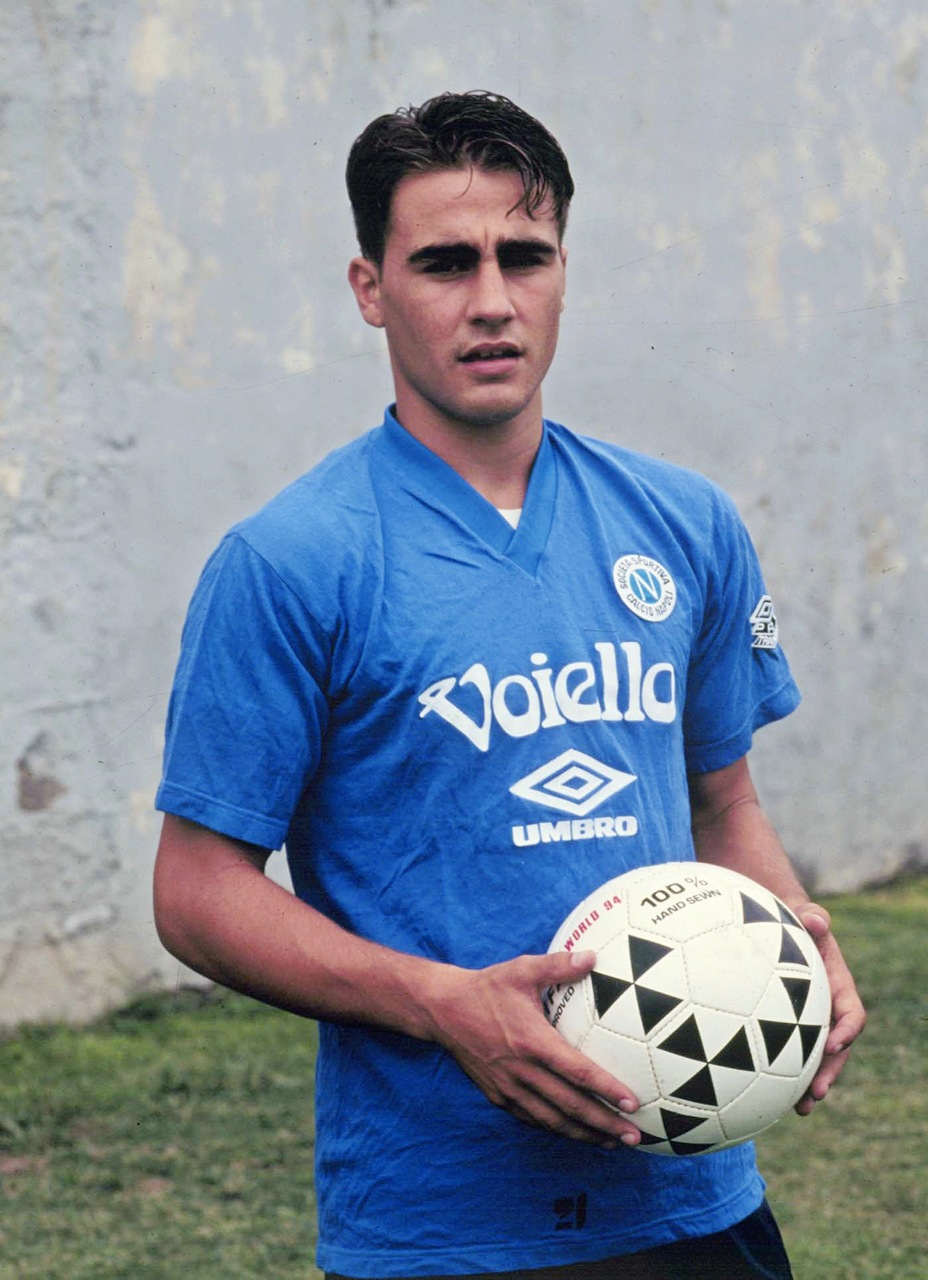
A 17-year-old Cannavaro trains with the Napoli youth side

As a youngster, Cannavaro played for a team from Bagnoli before being quickly spotted by the scouts of Napoli, his hometown and favourite childhood team. Cannavaro initially served as the club's ball boy and would often watch his idols Diego Maradona and Ciro Ferrara play. He later joined the club's youth team, initially playing as a midfielder like his idol Marco Tardelli, before the team's youth coach switched him to the role of centre-back. He gained a reputation when, in a training session at Napoli, the young Fabio produced a strong sliding challenge on Maradona, who was then the undisputed star of the club, to dispossess him. The rough challenge angered teammates and staff at Napoli. However, Maradona himself defended the promising player and encouraged him to play the way he wanted, and reportedly congratulated Cannavaro by giving him his boots as a souvenir after the training session.

Cannavaro's progress as a player was such that he soon became a member of the first team alongside some of his childhood idols. Cannavaro's debut in Serie A came on 7 March 1993, in Turin, in a 4–3 defeat to Juventus. As a centre-back alongside Ferrara, he soon demonstrated his anticipation, tackling, distribution and his ability to start attacking plays after winning possession. He scored his first career goal at the San Siro, against Milan, on 8 January 1995. However, despite his promising performances, the post-Maradona Napoli were in desperate need of funds and were soon forced to sell Cannavaro to Parma, where Cannavaro won the UEFA Cup and Coppa Italia, and was named the Serie A Defender of the Year. Cannavaro remained at Napoli until 1995, earning nearly 60 total appearances with the club, scoring one goal.

=== 1995–2002: Parma ===
Cannavaro was sold to Parma in the summer of 1995, and in his first season, he was instantly a regular on the first team, scoring once in 29 appearances in the league. He would go on to win trophies with the club and achieve several personal accomplishments, such as being named the team's captain. It was also in Parma that he met Gianluigi Buffon and Lilian Thuram, who would not only form one of the tightest defensive units of Europe with Cannavaro but would also become some of his closest friends in football. Further players featuring in this legendary Parma backline were Luigi Sartor, Roberto Mussi, Antonio Benarrivo, Luigi Apolloni and the Argentine Néstor Sensini. Cannavaro began to obtain success during his time at Parma. During his first season, Parma were eliminated in the second round of the Coppa Italia but finished in sixth place in Serie A that season, qualifying for the UEFA Cup. Parma also reached the quarter-finals of the 1995–96 UEFA Cup Winners' Cup that season. Parma finished the 1996–97 Serie A season as runners-up to Serie A champions Juventus, allowing them to qualify for the UEFA Champions League the following season. Parma were once again eliminated in the second round of the Coppa Italia and in the first round of the UEFA Cup that season. In the 1997–98 season, Parma finished in fifth place in Serie A and reached the Coppa Italia semi-finals, whilst they were knocked out in the group stage of the Champions League, finishing second in their group to defending champions Borussia Dortmund.

In his fourth season with the club, Cannavaro won his only European trophy, the UEFA Cup, as well as winning the Coppa Italia. Parma finished the Serie A season in fourth place, with one point from Fiorentina in third place. In the following season, Fabio's brother Paolo Cannavaro joined the team, and the two Cannavaro brothers were able to play alongside each other for the next two seasons. Fabio won his first Supercoppa Italiana title against Serie A champions Milan and Parma finished the Serie A season in fourth place, tied with Inter Milan for the final remaining Champions League spot. However, Parma lost 3–1 to Inter in the Serie A Champions League playoff match, failing to qualify for the Champions League group stage. They started in the third and final qualifying round of the Champions League and were eliminated by Rangers. They were knocked out in the round of 16 of both the UEFA Cup and the Coppa Italia that season.

In the 2000–01 season, Cannavaro aided in leading Parma to another Coppa Italia final, in which they were defeated by Fiorentina. They were eliminated in the third round of the UEFA Cup that season. Parma also finished the season in fourth place for the third consecutive season, which allowed them to go through to the Champions League qualifying round, although Parma were ultimately unable to qualify. In his final season with Parma, Cannavaro managed to win his second Coppa Italia title over Juventus, whilst Parma were eliminated in the round of 16 of the UEFA Cup, and finished the Serie A season in tenth place. In 1997, he began to earn call-ups to the national team's senior squad due to his performances for Parma, and he was consistently one of the best defenders in Serie A. In his time with Parma, Cannavaro made over 250 appearances in all competitions, scoring five goals.

=== 2002–2004: Inter Milan ===
In the summer of 2002, Cannavaro joined Inter Milan for a reported €23 million, on a four-year contract. At the time, Parma were in financial difficulty, while Inter had just lost a Serie A title in dramatic circumstances to Juventus and were in the process of rebuilding following four barren years and the departure of star striker Ronaldo. Along with Francesco Coco and his former Parma teammate Hernán Crespo, Cannavaro was supposed to be one of the faces of a new-look Inter led by manager Héctor Cúper.

However, during Cannavaro's spell with the club, Inter mostly flattered to deceive. His stint with the club began promisingly, as Inter reached the semi-finals of the 2002–03 Champions League and also finished runners-up in Serie A to Juventus in his first season with the club. However, his second season was not as productive, and he missed a large chunk of it through injury. He was also often played out of position. Inter finished fourth in Serie A and reached the semi-finals of the Coppa Italia, losing out to Juventus on penalties. Inter finished third in their Champions League group but would go on to reach the quarter-finals of the UEFA Cup. After two years with the club, he was sold to Juventus in a part-exchange deal after just over 50 appearances and two goals. After he left Italy, Cannavaro often spoke negatively of his spell at Inter, comparing the club unfavourably with his other Italian clubs, Parma and Juventus.

=== 2004–2006: Juventus and Calciopoli ===
After a two-year stint with Inter, Cannavaro signed for Juventus on the summer transfer window deadline day. The deal also involved the exchange of reserve goalkeeper Fabian Carini, who left for Inter, both players priced €10 million. By moving to Turin, he reunited with his ex-Parma teammates Lilian Thuram and Gianluigi Buffon, and together the trio formed one of the most feared defences in the Serie A, alongside the likes of Gianluca Zambrotta, Gianluca Pessotto, Alessandro Birindelli, Jonathan Zebina and Federico Balzaretti. Juventus went on to win two consecutive Scudetti in 2005 and 2006, although they suffered consecutive quarter final eliminations in the Champions League. In the former season, he was also paired with club icons Paolo Montero and Ciro Ferrara. Cannavaro also won four Oscar del Calcio awards for his exceptional seasons with the Turin giants, winning the 2005 Serie A Defender of the Year, the 2006 Defender of the Year, the 2006 Serie A Italian Footballer of the Year and the 2006 Serie A Footballer of the Year.

After the 2006 World Cup, the Calciopoli trial verdicts relegated Juventus to Serie B. Since Juventus were ineligible to qualify for the Champions League, Cannavaro decided to leave. "Even if I know this may be hard to believe, I would have stayed at Juventus had they remained in Serie A – even with a 30-point deduction." He followed Juve manager Fabio Capello to Real Madrid in the summer of 2006. In his two-year Scudetto-winning stint with Juventus, Cannavaro made over 100 total appearances in all competitions. His transfer was met with disappointment from the Juventus fans, who had accepted him as one of their own.

=== 2006–2009: Real Madrid ===
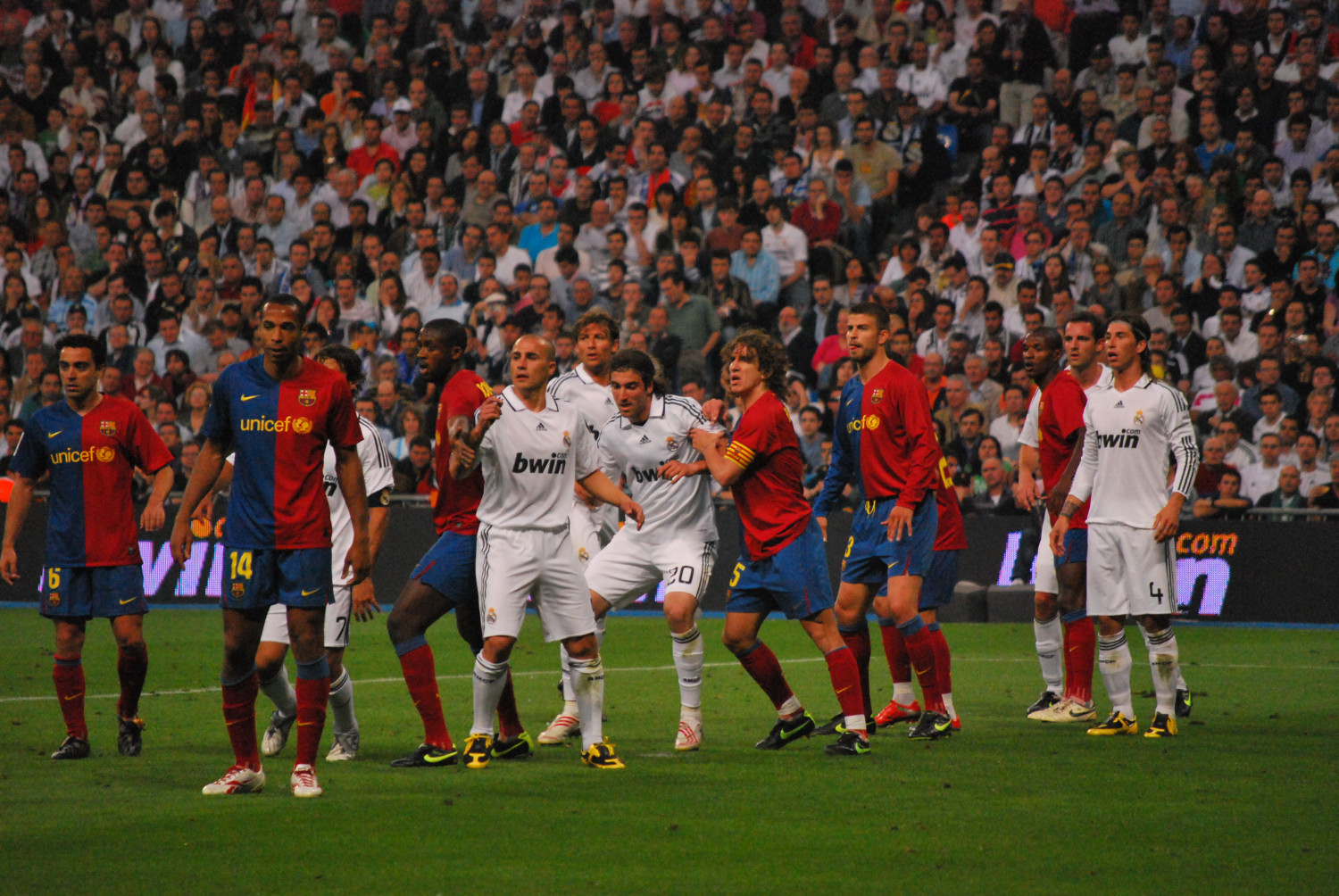
Cannavaro (far left, in white) with Real Madrid against Barcelona

Real Madrid paid €7 million to sign Cannavaro, and gave him the number 5 shirt which had previously been worn by French international Zinedine Zidane. Cannavaro spent three seasons at Madrid, winning the Liga title in 2006–07 and 2007–08, and being named the 2006 FIFA World Player of the Year, also winning the 2006 Ballon d'Or. Cannavaro was elected as part of the 2006 and the 2007 FIFPro World XI squads, and the 2006 UEFA Team of the Year. He was named in the six-man shortlist for the 2007 Laureus World Sportsman of the Year.

On 19 May 2009, it was confirmed Cannavaro would return to Juventus for the 2009–10 season at the conclusion of his contract. On his final match at the Santiago Bernabéu Stadium, he was given a standing ovation by the fans. In April 2013, Cannavaro was named by Marca as a member of the "Best foreign eleven in Real Madrid's history".

=== 2009–2010: Return to Juventus ===
Three years after Cannavaro left Juventus, and following the end of his contract with Real Madrid, in the summer of 2009, he decided to return to the club on a free transfer. Cannavaro started the new season very well, forming good defensive partnerships with Nicola Legrottaglie, Martín Cáceres, Zdeněk Grygera, Fabio Grosso and most notably Giorgio Chiellini, in front of goalkeeper Gianluigi Buffon. However, from Autumn onwards, Juventus' form took a turn for the worse. Having been injured for a while in late 2009, Cannavaro struggled with his own form both on his comeback and subsequently, and Juventus were knocked out of the Champions League, finishing third in their group.

In March 2010, Cannavaro's relationship with the Juventus supporters, already fragile due to a perceived betrayal of the club when he left for Real Madrid, reached an all-time low. In a UEFA Europa League tie against Fulham, Juventus, who had won the first leg 3–1 at home, were leading 1–0 at Craven Cottage in London. Early in the first half, Cannavaro accumulated two bookings for reckless challenges and was sent off. Reduced to ten men, Juventus collapsed to a 4–1 loss and were eliminated on aggregate. Cannavaro enraged supporters with the sending-off and its consequent role in the team's elimination. Juventus were also eliminated in the quarter-finals of the Coppa Italia to eventual champions and treble winners Inter Milan.

The club finished the league season in seventh place, with only a Europa League spot, its worst Serie A finish for a decade. Juventus subsequently confirmed Cannavaro's contract would not be renewed. His performances had become unreliable, so much so that his hometown club Napoli made no attempt to sign him, despite Cannavaro expressing his wish to rejoin the club on more than one occasion.

=== 2010–2011: Al-Ahli ===
On 2 June 2010, it was announced Cannavaro would move to UAE League side Al-Ahli on a free transfer after the 2010 World Cup. Cannavaro signed a two-year deal. He made 16 appearances for the Dubai club, scoring two goals. Cannavaro announced his retirement from football in July 2011 due to a serious knee problem; doctors had told him he could no longer play.

One year after Cannavaro's retirement from Al-Ahli, it was announced he was joining the Indian league team Siliguri. In a footballers' auction whose line-up included names such as Jay-Jay Okocha, Hernán Crespo and Robbie Fowler, Cannavaro was bought by Siliguri for $830,000, exceeding his "base price" by $50,000. However, the league never came to fruition and Cannavaro stayed in retirement.

== International career ==
=== Youth career ===
Cannavaro's first taste of international success came over in the mid-1990s under coach Cesare Maldini with Italy's under-21 side, winning two consecutive UEFA European Under-21 Championship titles, in 1994 and 1996, and developing an important defensive partnership with Alessandro Nesta, which would also continue at senior level. In 1996, he participated also at the Summer Olympics in Atlanta. He subsequently played for his country in the 1998, 2002, 2006 and 2010 FIFA World Cups, as well as in the 2000 and 2004 UEFA European Championships.

=== Early senior career and 1998 World Cup ===
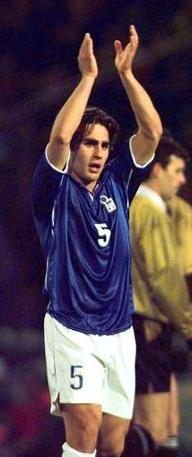
Cannavaro with Italy in 1998

Cannavaro made his debut with the Italy national team on 22 January 1997, in a friendly match against Northern Ireland. The same year, he earned plaudits for his handling of England striker Alan Shearer in a World Cup qualifying game at Wembley Stadium. Shearer was then considered by the partisan English crowd to be the best striker in the world, and thought he would make fun of the inexperienced Italian defender. Nevertheless, in a display ranking alongside those of the very best Italian defenders Claudio Gentile and Franco Baresi, Cannavaro managed to keep Shearer quiet for the whole game. Italy won the game 1–0 courtesy of a Gianfranco Zola goal.

Cannavaro's first international tournament came at 1998 World Cup alongside the experienced and capable Giuseppe Bergomi, Alessandro Costacurta and Paolo Maldini, as well as the emerging Alessandro Nesta, with Paolo Maldini's father, Cesare Maldini, as head coach. Cannavaro made several strong performances throughout the tournament, although Italy eventually went out in the quarter-finals to hosts and eventual champions France, in a match where Cannavaro suffered a cut to his forehead following an elbow by Stéphane Guivarc'h. The Azzurri managed a 0–0 draw, eventually being decided by a penalty shoot-out in favour of the hosts.

=== Euro 2000 Final, 2002 World Cup and Euro 2004 ===
At Euro 2000, under manager Dino Zoff, Cannavaro had a strong tournament, playing as centre-back alongside either Alessandro Nesta, Mark Iuliano or Paolo Maldini in 3–5–2 formation. The Italian defence only conceded two goals en route to the final: one against Turkey, and one against Sweden, both in the group stage, keeping three clean sheets in total. The Azzurri reached the final after defeating the Netherlands on penalties following a goalless draw in regulation time. Italy led the then-world champions France 1–0 going into injury time. However, Sylvain Wiltord equalised in the final minute of injury time, and an extra-time golden goal from David Trezeguet gave France the title. Cannavaro was elected as part of the Team of the Tournament for his performances.

At the 2002 World Cup, under manager Giovanni Trapattoni, Cannavaro was credited with holding the defence together almost single-handedly after his usual defensive partner Alessandro Nesta was injured against Croatia. This injury, alongside several errors by match officials, dealt a severe blow to Italy's chances of winning the World Cup, the side having relied heavily on the Cannavaro–Nesta partnership in central defence. Marco Materazzi, who deputised for Nesta, put in performances that were below his usual standards. Cannavaro picked up two yellow card during the group stage and was suspended for the round of 16 match, meaning Italy would be left without their two starting centre-backs. Italy went out controversially in the second round, losing to co-hosts and eventual semi-finalists South Korea, once again to a golden goal.

Cannavaro had a difficult act to follow when he took over as captain from Paolo Maldini after the 2002 World Cup, but he quickly won the team over with his leadership, calming influence and inspirational performances, helping Italy qualify for Euro 2004. After Maldini's international retirement, he first captained Italy in a 1–0 defeat to Slovenia in Trieste on 21 August 2002. He was later officially named Italy's captain for an away UEFA Euro 2004 qualifying match against Azerbaijan on 7 September, which Italy won 2–0. In Italy's qualifier against Serbia and Montenegro in Naples, on 12 October, he received a standing ovation on the pitch where he wore the local side's colours, as Italy drew 1–1.

Cannavaro scored his first international goal on 30 May 2004, in a 4–0 win against Tunisia, in Tunis. Euro 2004, which was hosted by Portugal, turned out to be a disappointment. Cannavaro picked up yellow cards during his nations two opening group draws with Denmark (0–0) and Sweden (1–1), forcing him to sit out the final group match. Italy defeated Bulgaria 2–1, but failed to advance on goal difference.

=== 2006 World Cup winner ===
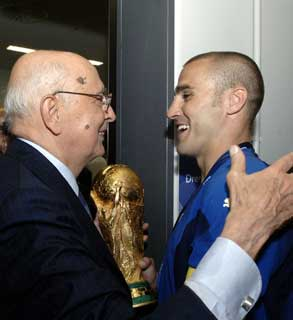
Cannavaro (right), alongside Italy President Giorgio Napolitano, holds the 2006 World Cup trophy

Cannavaro captained Italy throughout their successful 2006 World Cup campaign with composure and aplomb under manager Marcello Lippi. One of his key performances came in a 2–0 extra-time win against hosts Germany in the semi-finals of the tournament: in the last minute of extra-time, with Italy leading 1–0 and facing a German attack, Cannavaro outjumped Per Mertesacker to clear the ball from his area. He subsequently ran forward to dispossess Lukas Podolski, and carried the ball up to Francesco Totti in midfield, who started the play that led to Italy's second goal, which was scored by Alessandro Del Piero from an assist by Alberto Gilardino. However, Cannavaro's crowning moment was lifting the World Cup trophy on 9 July 2006, the night of his 100th cap. Cannavaro did not receive a single yellow or red card during the 690 minutes he played in the tournament. His defensive performance in the final earned him the nickname of "Wall of Berlin", as the final was played in Berlin.

Along with goalkeeper Gianluigi Buffon, Cannavaro played each minute of every match in the tournament for Italy, completing 211 passes and winning 16 challenges. Even with usual defensive partner Alessandro Nesta out due to injury, the Italian defence kept a record five clean sheets and conceded only two goals throughout the entire tournament: an own-goal against the United States and a Zinedine Zidane penalty in the final against France.

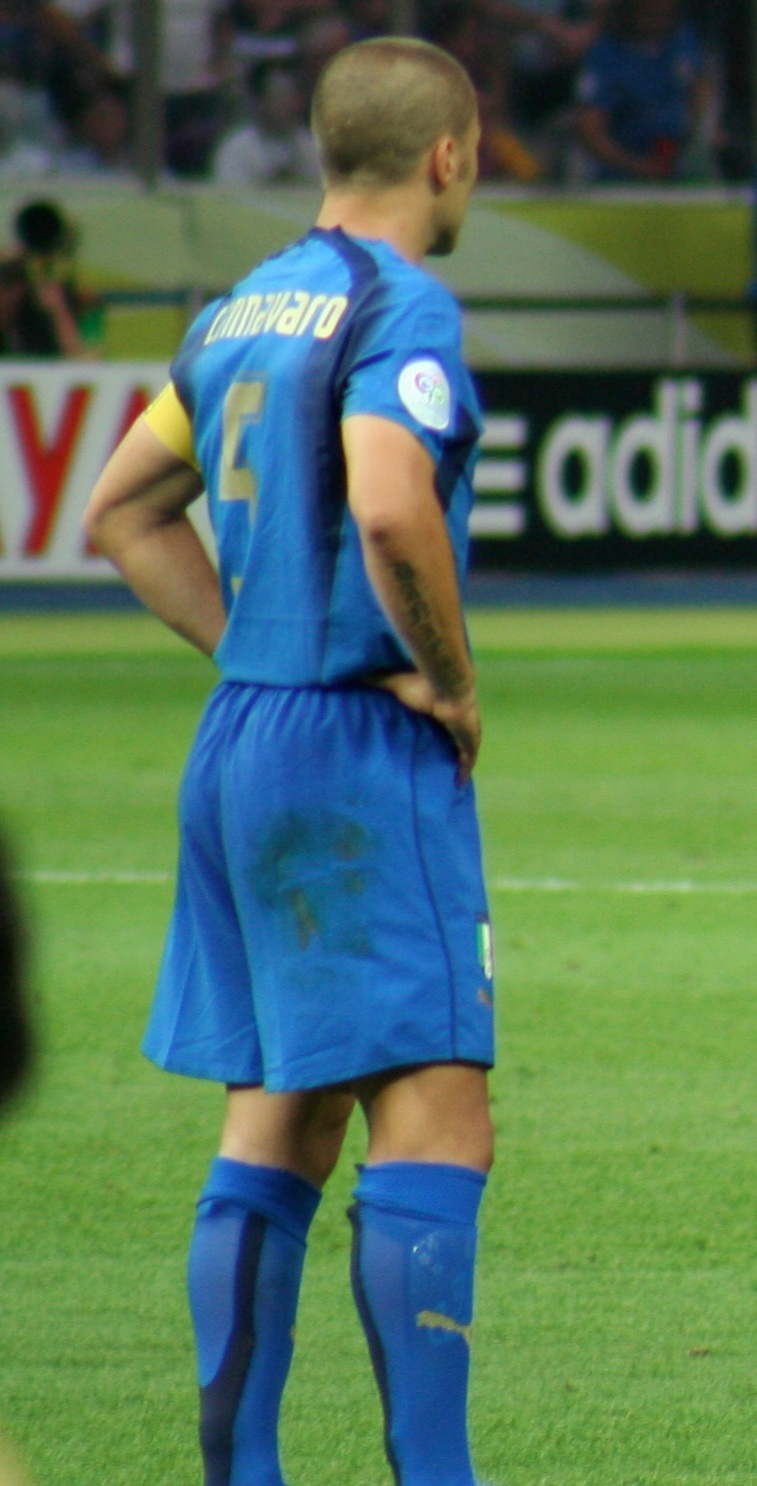
Cannavaro in final match World Cup 2006

Cannavaro's leadership and marshalling of the Italian defence throughout their march to the final earned him a place in the All-Star Team at the end of the competition (awarded by FIFA's Technical Study Group) alongside six other Italian teammates: Gianluigi Buffon, Francesco Totti, Gennaro Gattuso, Andrea Pirlo, Luca Toni and Gianluca Zambrotta. He was runner-up in the race for the Golden Ball, finishing behind French counterpart Zinedine Zidane; it was a close contest with Zidane polling 2012 points to Cannavaro's 1977. Cannavaro was also awarded the 2006 Ballon d'Or and the 2006 FIFA World Player of the Year for his performances throughout the season and at the World Cup, also being named to the FIFPro World XI and the UEFA Team of the Year.

=== Euro 2008 ===
On 2 June 2008, Cannavaro was injured during Italy's first training session for Euro 2008. He sustained a knock following a tackle by fellow defender Giorgio Chiellini and was carried off the field on a stretcher. Italian squad doctor Paolo Zeppilli said, "We have to do tests but it does not look like a minor injury." These tests consequently showed that he had torn ligaments in his left ankle. Right after the examinations, Italian journalists waited for Cannavaro, who told them simply, "I'm going home", with a melancholic smile on his face. With that news, Italy manager Roberto Donadoni then called up Fiorentina centre-back Alessandro Gamberini as his official replacement. Alessandro Del Piero captained the team in his place. Cannavaro added that he would stay with the squad to offer support. This would have been Cannavaro's third Euro tournament.

Cannavaro also put his plans to retire from the national team after Euro 2008 on hold and added that the injury had made him more determined than ever to captain Italy through the 2010 World Cup.

=== Record-breaking caps at the 2009 Confederations Cup ===
In Italy's final 2009 Confederations Cup group match against Brazil, Cannavaro equalled Paolo Maldini's record of being Italy's most capped player, although Italy were defeated 3–0 and were disappointingly eliminated from the tournament in the group stage. On 12 August 2009, in a friendly match against Switzerland, Cannavaro became Italy's most capped player of all time. He won his 127th cap for his country, beating Maldini's former record of 126.

=== 2010 World Cup and retirement ===
Cannavaro captained Italy at the 2010 World Cup in South Africa, once again under Marcello Lippi, although his performances were not as strong as in previous editions, and he and the Italian squad received criticism from the press. The defending champions crashed out of the competition in the group stage after finishing last in their group with 2 points, losing 3–2 to Slovakia in their final group match, after drawing 1–1 against both New Zealand and Paraguay. Following Italy's failure to progress past the group stage, Cannavaro announced his retirement from international football. In total, Cannavaro made 136 appearances for Italy between 1997 and 2010, scoring 2 goals, making him the second-most capped Italian player of all time, behind only Gianluigi Buffon. Cannavaro has also made the second-most appearances for Italy as captain, behind only Buffon, wearing the armband on 79 occasions.

== Managerial career ==
=== Al-Ahli ===
After his retirement, Cannavaro was appointed a global brand ambassador and technical consultant of Al-Ahli Club of Dubai on 25 August 2011. In July 2013, after Cosmin Olăroiu took charge as new head coach of Al-Ahli, Cannavaro was named as his first team coach. He guided Al-Ahli to UAE Pro League and UAE League Cup titles in his first season in charge.

=== Guangzhou Evergrande ===
On 5 November 2014, Cannavaro was named as the new head coach of Chinese Super League title-holder and four-time champions Guangzhou Evergrande, replacing his former national team manager Marcello Lippi. Cannavaro was formally unveiled by the club on the same day. On 4 June 2015, Guangzhou Evergrande suddenly announced Cannavaro was replaced by Luiz Felipe Scolari after a Super League match against Tianjin Teda.

=== Al Nassr ===
On 24 October 2015, Cannavaro was named new head coach of Saudi Arabian club Al Nassr replacing Jorge da Silva. The following 11 February, he rescinded his contract.

=== Tianjin Quanjian ===
On 9 June 2016, Tianjin Quanjian, who were on a streak of seven consecutive competitive matches without a win under Vanderlei Luxemburgo, announced Cannavaro became the new manager of the club. They were ranked eighth place in the league at the time, and on 22 October he guided Quanjian to the 2016 China League One title, thus sealing their promotion to the 2017 Chinese Super League.

Under Cannavaro, Quanjian finished third in their top-tier debut with 15 wins, 9 draws and 6 losses and advanced to 2018 AFC Champions League Qualifying play-offs. On 6 November 2017, Quanjian announced the club accepted Cannavaro's resignation from the club. He won the Chinese Football Association Coach of the Year award in November 2017.

=== Return to Guangzhou Evergrande ===
On 9 November 2017, Guangzhou Evergrande appointed Cannavaro as manager for the second time. He was relieved of his position on 27 October 2019, and went to corporate culture training, with captain Zheng Zhi the acting manager. He returned six days later. On 1 December 2019, he won the Chinese Super League. Cannavaro left Guangzhou again in September 2021.

=== China national team ===
On 15 March 2019, Cannavaro was appointed manager of the China national team, in conjunction with coaching Guangzhou Evergrande. Six days later he lost his first match in charge, a 1–0 home defeat in the China Cup to Thailand. On 28 April, he stood down to focus on his role at Guangzhou Evergrande.

=== Benevento ===
On 21 September 2022, Cannavaro took on his first managerial job in his native Italy, becoming the new head coach of Serie B club Benevento. On 4 February 2023, after failing to improve the club's fortunes and with the club deep into the relegation zone, he was sacked by Benevento.

=== Udinese ===
On 22 April 2024, Cannavaro became the new manager of Serie A club Udinese in substitution of Gabriele Cioffi. A few days after escaping relegation on the final matchday of the season following a dramatic 1–0 away win against Frosinone, who were overtaken by Udinese and got relegated following that result, the club announced Cannavaro's departure from the club.

=== Dinamo Zagreb ===
In December 2024, Cannavaro was confirmed as the new manager of Croatian club Dinamo Zagreb, marking his first adventure in a foreign country in Europe. Cannavaro's first competitive match was in the Champions League against Arsenal, where Dinamo lost 3–0. Cannavaro had his first competitive win against Milan; however, despite Dinamo winning 2–1, the club failed to reach the knockout playoffs of the Champions League. By April 2025, Dinamo were eight points behind title rivals Hajduk Split and Cannavaro was heavily criticized for his way of managing the club. On 9 April, he was sacked.

=== Uzbekistan national team ===
On 6 October 2025, the Uzbekistan national team appointed Cannavaro as their head coach, particularly for their debut World Cup appearance in the 2026 FIFA World Cup. On 18 June, Uzbekistan lost their opener against Colombia 3–1. However, Cannavaro's appearance as a manager made him only the fourth individual in history to win a Ballon d'Or and participate in a World Cup as both a player and a manager, alongside Franz Beckenbauer, Oleg Blokhin, and Marco van Basten. In the team's opening match on 17 June, Abbosbek Fayzullaev scored the Uzbekistan's first World Cup goal ever in a 3–1 defeat to Colombia. In their second group match on 23 June, the team suffered a 5–0 defeat to Portugal.

== Player profile ==
"Cannavaro has been the most accomplished defender at this World Cup [in 2006]. He has been the only permanent member of Italy's ever-changing backline. He has been imperious. Rigorous. Absolutely in charge. Standing tall at 5ft 9in, he is dwarfed by just about every other centre-half in Germany, yet he has risen serenely above them all, seemingly without a bead of sweat."

— Amy Lawrence, The Guardian.

Cannavaro is considered one of the greatest defenders of all time, winning the World Cup as Italy's captain, as well as the Ballon d'Or and the FIFA World Player of the Year Award in 2006. Although he predominantly excelled as a centre-back, due to his ability to read the game, he was also deployed as a right or left sided full-back on occasion, in particular under his Inter coach Héctor Cúper. This was made possible due to Cannavaro's tactical intelligence, versatility, technical ability, ball playing ability, stamina, low centre of gravity and pace, which also enabled him to start plays from the backline after winning possession.

As a defender, Cannavaro was known in particular for his concentration, anticipation, awareness and positional sense. Despite his relatively small stature for a defender, he was highly regarded for his aerial ability, courtesy of his elevation, physical strength, athleticism, timing and heading accuracy, which enabled him to outjump larger players and made him particularly adept at defending crosses, or at scoring with his head from set-pieces. Throughout his career, he made a name for himself as a dynamic, consistent, tenacious and complete defender, known for his acceleration, speed, reactions, and agility, as well as his tackling ability, and in particular, his precise sliding challenges. Due to his wide range of skills, he excelled in a zonal marking system, but was also an excellent man-marker. During his time at Parma under manager Alberto Malesani, he also stood out for his ability to press opposing forwards, which allowed the team to maintain a high three-man defensive line effectively. Nicknamed Canna ("reed"), by his former Italy defensive teammate Paolo Maldini, as a reference to his surname and mental strength, in addition to his ability as a defender, Cannavaro was also known for his leadership, determination, strong temperament and charisma, both on and off the pitch, as well as his ability to organise his defence. Cannavaro also attributes his positive character, calm composure under pressure and self-assurance in his abilities, as well as his diet, work-rate and discipline in training, as some of the key reasons for his success as a footballer, as well as his ability to inspire confidence in his teammates.

== Media ==
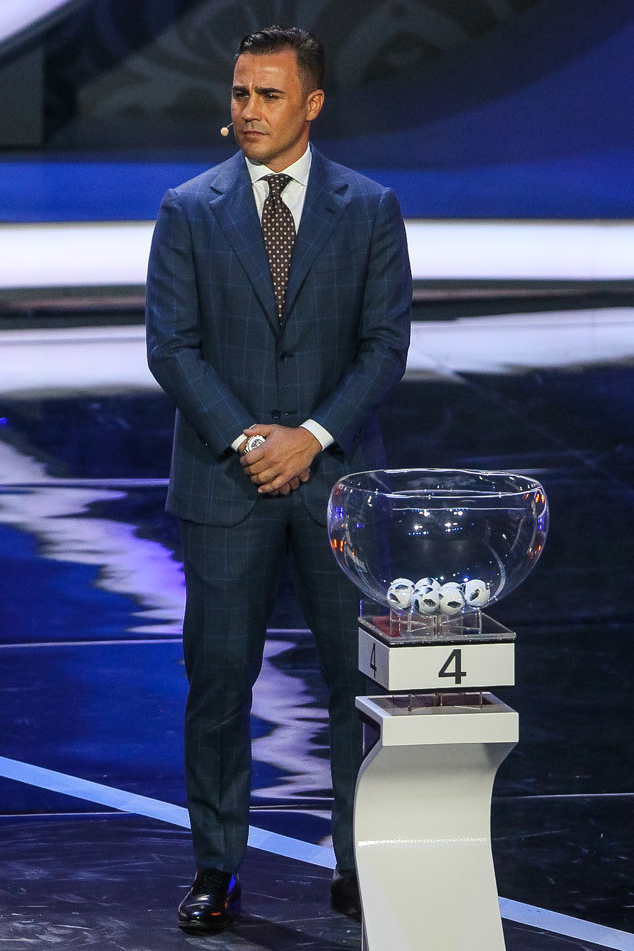
Cannavaro in Moscow in December 2017 at the draw for the 2018 World Cup

Cannavaro was sponsored by sportswear company Nike and appeared in Nike commercials. In a Nike advertising campaign in the run-up to the 2002 World Cup in Korea and Japan, Cannavaro starred in a "Secret Tournament" commercial (branded "Scopion KO") directed by Terry Gilliam, appearing alongside football players such as Thierry Henry, Ronaldo, Francesco Totti, Ronaldinho, Luís Figo and Hidetoshi Nakata, with former player Eric Cantona the tournament "referee". A 2010 Nike commercial, Write the Future directed by Alejandro González Iñárritu, begins with Cannavaro making an impressive goal-line clearance from a Didier Drogba shot, before it cuts away to him being guest of honour on a Mediaset-style Italian variety programme, where dancers wearing sequined variations of his #6 shirt re-enact the clearance while suspended on wires.

Cannavaro was on the cover of the Italian edition of SCEE's This is Football 2003. Cannavaro also features in EA Sports' FIFA video game series; he was named to the Ultimate Team Legends in FIFA 14. An icon in FIFA 19, Cannavaro has a 92 rating. Cannavaro worked as a pundit on ITV during the 2014 World Cup.

== Personal life ==
Cannavaro married Daniela Arenoso (b. 1974) on 17 June 1996, they have three children, Christian (b. 1998) – also a footballer, who was playing as a midfielder for Serie B side Benevento before retiring in 2019 - Martina (b. 2001) and Andrea (b. 2004).

Cannavaro's younger brother, Paolo, was also a defender who last played for Sassuolo, and previously also played for Napoli, Verona and Parma. The two brothers played alongside each other at Parma from 2000 until 2002, when Fabio left for Inter. Before his retirement, Fabio had often expressed interest in ending his career with Paolo in a Napoli shirt.

With his fellow Neapolitan friend and former defensive teammate Ciro Ferrara, Cannavaro has helped establish a charity foundation, Fondazione Cannavaro Ferrara, specialising in the procurement of cancer research equipment and surgery for special cases of cancer for a hospital in their native Naples; the foundation also aims to help at-risk youth in Naples.

== Controversies ==
The night before the 1999 UEFA Cup Final, a videotape was released which showed Cannavaro being injected with a substance. The substance was found to be neoton (phosphocreatine), which is used in cardiac surgery to protect the heart during periods of anoxia and stress. It is not on the banned substance list. This chemical is, in partnership with adenosine triphosphate (ATP), fundamental to the ability of the body to produce muscular energy. Phosphocreatine is formed naturally within the body, with over 95% of the compound stored within the muscle cells. The body also receives dietary creatine primarily through the consumption of meat. No action was taken regarding this incident.

On 8 October 2009, Cannavaro failed a drug test. However, Juventus claimed the drugs were medicine for a severe allergic reaction to a wasp sting and not performance-enhancing. Because of the urgent nature of the treatment, Cannavaro could not ask for permission to CONI in time, which was done immediately afterwards. Apparently, while awaiting the conclusion of formalities involved for CONI with granting this permission, he was subjected to the drug test that eventually gave a positive result. CONI later dropped charges against him.

In February 2015, Cannavaro, his wife Daniela and his brother Paolo were respectively handed ten-month, four-month and six-month prison sentences for breaching orders and entering Fabio's residence after authorities seized it in 2009 amid an investigation into fraudulent activity and tax evasion. All three have appealed and will have their sentences suspended until the final judgement.

== Career statistics ==
=== Club ===
Appearances and goals by club, season and competition
| Club | Season | League | | | Cup | | Continental | | Other | | Total | |
| Club | Season | Division | Apps | Goals | Apps | Goals | Apps | Goals | Apps | Goals | Apps | Goals |
|---|---|---|---|---|---|---|---|---|---|---|---|---|
| Napoli | 1992–93 | Serie A | 2 | 0 | 1 | 0 | 0 | 0 | – | | 3 | 0 |
| Napoli | 1993–94 | Serie A | 27 | 0 | 2 | 0 | – | | – | | 29 | 0 |
| Napoli | 1994–95 | Serie A | 29 | 1 | 4 | 0 | 3 | 0 | – | | 36 | 1 |
| Napoli | Total | | 58 | 1 | 7 | 0 | 3 | 0 | 0 | 0 | 68 | 1 |
| Parma | 1995–96 | Serie A | 29 | 1 | 0 | 0 | 6 | 0 | 1 (Note: Supercoppa Italiana) | 0 | 36 | 1 |
| Parma | 1996–97 | Serie A | 27 | 0 | 1 | 0 | 2 | 0 | – | | 30 | 0 |
| Parma | 1997–98 | Serie A | 31 | 0 | 6 | 0 | 7 | 0 | – | | 44 | 0 |
| Parma | 1998–99 | Serie A | 30 | 1 | 7 | 0 | 8 | 0 | – | | 45 | 1 |
| Parma | 1999–2000 | Serie A | 31 | 2 | 3 | 0 | 9 | 1 | 2 (Note: One Champions League playoff match, one Supercoppa Italiana match) | 0 | 45 | 3 |
| Parma | 2000–01 | Serie A | 33 | 0 | 7 | 0 | 6 | 0 | – | | 46 | 0 |
| Parma | 2001–02 | Serie A | 31 | 1 | 5 | 0 | 9 | 0 | – | | 45 | 0 |
| Parma | Total | | 212 | 5 | 29 | 0 | 47 | 1 | 3 | 0 | 291 | 5 |
| Inter Milan | 2002–03 | Serie A | 28 | 0 | 0 | 0 | 12 | 1 | – | | 40 | 1 |
| Inter Milan | 2003–04 | Serie A | 22 | 2 | 3 | 0 | 9 | 0 | – | | 34 | 2 |
| Inter Milan | Total | | 50 | 2 | 3 | 0 | 21 | 1 | 0 | 0 | 74 | 3 |
| Juventus | 2004–05 | Serie A | 38 | 2 | 0 | 0 | 9 | 1 | – | | 47 | 3 |
| Juventus | 2005–06 | Serie A | 36 | 4 | 2 | 0 | 9 | 0 | 1 | 0 | 48 | 4 |
| Juventus | Total | | 74 | 6 | 2 | 0 | 18 | 1 | 1 | 0 | 95 | 7 |
| Real Madrid | 2006–07 | La Liga | 32 | 0 | 1 | 0 | 6 | 0 | – | | 39 | 0 |
| Real Madrid | 2007–08 | La Liga | 33 | 0 | 1 | 0 | 6 | 0 | 2 (Note: Supercopa de España) | 1 | 42 | 1 |
| Real Madrid | 2008–09 | La Liga | 29 | 0 | 1 | 0 | 7 | 0 | – | | 37 | 0 |
| Real Madrid | Total | | 94 | 0 | 3 | 0 | 19 | 0 | 2 | 1 | 118 | 1 |
| Juventus | 2009–10 | Serie A | 27 | 0 | 1 | 0 | 5 | 0 | – | | 33 | 0 |
| Al-Ahli Dubai | 2010–11 | UAE Pro League | 16 | 2 | 0 | 0 | 0 | 0 | – | | 16 | 2 |
| Career total | | | 531 | 16 | 45 | 0 | 113 | 3 | 6 | 1 | 695 | 19 |

=== International ===
Appearances and goals by national team and year
| National team | Year | Apps | Goals |
|---|---|---|---|
| Italy | 1997 | 12 | 0 |
| Italy | 1998 | 11 | 0 |
| Italy | 1999 | 8 | 0 |
| Italy | 2000 | 14 | 0 |
| Italy | 2001 | 9 | 0 |
| Italy | 2002 | 12 | 0 |
| Italy | 2003 | 10 | 0 |
| Italy | 2004 | 6 | 1 |
| Italy | 2005 | 8 | 0 |
| Italy | 2006 | 15 | 0 |
| Italy | 2007 | 8 | 0 |
| Italy | 2008 | 8 | 1 |
| Italy | 2009 | 10 | 0 |
| Italy | 2010 | 5 | 0 |
| Total | | 136 | 2 |

Scores and results list Italy's goal tally first, score column indicates score after each Cannavaro goal.

List of international goals scored by Fabio Cannavaro
| No. | Date | Venue | Opponent | Score | Result | Competition |
|---|---|---|---|---|---|---|
| 1 | 30 May 2004 | Radès, Tunisia | Tunisia | 2–0 | 4–0 | Friendly |
| 2 | 6 February 2008 | Zürich, Switzerland | Portugal | 2–0 | 3–1 | Friendly |

== Managerial statistics ==
As of match played 17 November 2026

Managerial record by team and tenure
| Team | Nat. | From | To | Record | | | | | Ref. |
| Team | Nat. | From | To | G | W | D | L | Win % | Ref. |
|---|---|---|---|---|---|---|---|---|---|
| Guangzhou Evergrande | (China) | 5 November 2014 | 4 June 2015 | 22 | 11 | 6 | 5 | 50.00 | |
| Al Nassr | (Saudi Arabia) | 26 October 2015 | 11 February 2016 | 16 | 6 | 7 | 3 | 37.50 | |
| Tianjin Quanjian | (China) | 9 June 2016 | 6 November 2017 | 55 | 33 | 10 | 12 | 60.00 | |
| Guangzhou Evergrande | (China) | 9 November 2017 | 29 September 2021 | 132 | 79 | 23 | 30 | 59.85 | |
| China PR | (China) | 15 March 2019 | 29 April 2019 | 2 | 0 | 0 | 2 | 0.00 | |
| Benevento | (Italy) | 21 September 2022 | 4 February 2023 | 17 | 3 | 7 | 7 | 17.65 | |
| Udinese | (Italy) | 22 April 2024 | 30 June 2024 | 6 | 2 | 3 | 1 | 33.33 | |
| Dinamo Zagreb | (Croatia) | 29 December 2024 | 9 April 2025 | 14 | 7 | 2 | 5 | 50.00 | |
| Uzbekistan | (Uzbekistan) | 6 October 2025 | Present | 16 | 6 | 2 | 8 | 37.50 | |
| Career Total | | | | 280 | 147 | 60 | 73 | 52.50 | |

== Honours ==
=== Player ===
Parma

- Coppa Italia: 1998–99, 2001–02
- Supercoppa Italiana: 1999
- UEFA Cup: 1998–99

Juventus

- Serie A: 2004–05, 2005–06 (both revoked due to Calciopoli scandal)

Real Madrid

- La Liga: 2006–07, 2007–08
- Supercopa de España: 2008

Italy U-21

- UEFA European Under-21 Championship: 1994, 1996

Italy

- FIFA World Cup: 2006
- UEFA European Championship runner-up: 2000

Individual

- UEFA Under-21 Championship Golden Player: 1996
- UEFA European Championship Team of the Tournament: 2000
- FICTS Hall of Fame and Excellence Guirlande d'Honneur: 2002
- Serie A Defender of the Year: 2005, 2006
- ESM Team of the Year: 2004–05
- FIFA World Player of the Year: 2006
- Ballon d'Or: 2006
- FIFA World Cup Silver Ball: 2006
- FIFA World Cup All-Star Team: 2006
- World Soccer Player of the Year: 2006
- Serie A Footballer of the Year: 2006
- Serie A Italian Footballer of the Year: 2006
- UEFA Team of the Year: 2006
- FIFPro World XI: 2006, 2007
- Sports Illustrated Team of the Decade: 2009
- ESPN World Team of the Decade: 2009
- Gran Galà del Calcio AIC Lifetime Achievement Award 2011
- Italian Football Hall of Fame: 2014
- Juventus Greatest XI of All Time: 2017
- Golden Foot: 2024, as Football Legend
- Juventus FC Hall of Fame: 2025

=== Manager ===
Tianjin Quanjian

- China League One: 2016

Guangzhou Evergrande

- Chinese Super League: 2019
- Chinese FA Super Cup: 2018

Individual

- Chinese Football Association Coach of the Year: 2017

=== Orders ===
- 5th Class / Knight: Cavaliere Ordine al Merito della Repubblica Italiana: 2000

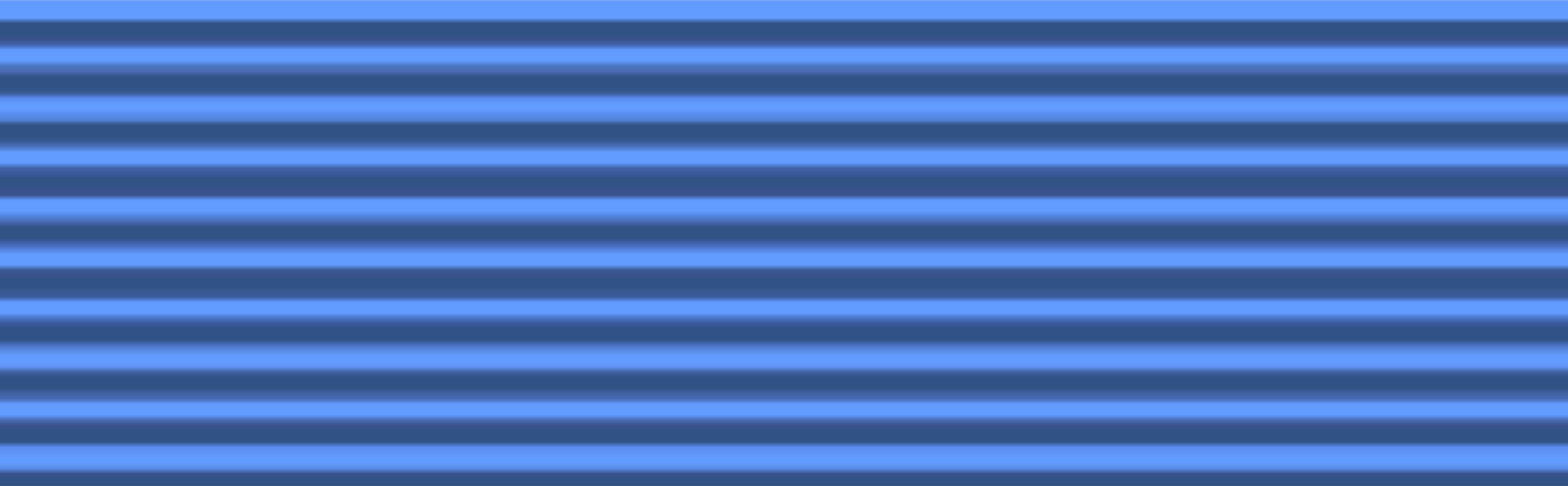
- CONI: Golden Collar of Sports Merit: 2006

- 4th Class / Officer: Ufficiale Ordine al Merito della Repubblica Italiana: 2006

== See also ==
- List of footballers with 100 or more caps
- List of association football families

Sporting positions
| Preceded by Paolo Maldini | Italy captain 2002–2010 | Succeeded by Gianluigi Buffon |
