= 2006 Ballon d'Or =

Annual association football award event in France

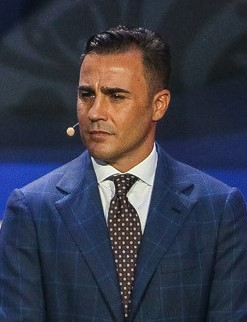
- 2006 Ballon d'Or winner, Fabio Cannavaro in 2017
- Date: 27 November 2006
- Location: Paris, France
- Country: France
- Presented by: France Football

Highlights
- Won by: (Italy) Fabio Cannavaro (1st award)
- Website: ballondor.com

The 2006 Ballon d'Or (lit. '2006 Golden Ball'), given to the best football player in Europe as judged by a panel of sports journalists from UEFA member countries, was awarded to the Italian defender Fabio Cannavaro on 27 November 2006.

Fabio Cannavaro is the most recent defender to have won the award as well as the last Italian player to have won it as of 2026.

== Rankings ==
On 16 October 2006, was announced the shortlist of 50 male players compiled by a group of experts from France Football.

There were 52 voters, from Albania, Andorra, Armenia, Austria, Azerbaijan, Belarus, Belgium, Bosnia and Herzegovina, Bulgaria, Croatia, Cyprus, Czech Republic, Denmark, England, Estonia, Faroe Islands, Finland, France, Georgia, Germany, Greece, Hungary, Iceland, Israel, Italy, Kazakhstan, Latvia, Liechtenstein, Lithuania, Luxembourg, Macedonia, Malta, Moldova, the Netherlands, Northern Ireland, Norway, Poland, Portugal, Republic of Ireland, Romania, Russia, San Marino, Scotland, Serbia, Slovakia, Slovenia, Spain, Sweden, Switzerland, Turkey, Ukraine and Wales. Each picked a first (5pts), second (4pts), third (3pts), fourth (2pts) and fifth choice (1pt).

=== Voted players ===
Rank	Player	Nationality	Club(s)	Total	Votes by place					Votes
Rank	Player	Nationality	Club(s)	Total	1st	2nd	3rd	4th	5th	Votes
1st	Fabio Cannavaro	Italy	(Italy) Juventus (Spain) Real Madrid	173	20	12	5	5	-	42
2nd	Gianluigi Buffon	Italy	(Italy) Juventus	124	14	6	8	2	2	32
3rd	Thierry Henry	France	(England) Arsenal	121	6	15	5	6	4	36
4th	Ronaldinho	Brazil	(Spain) Barcelona	73	2	5	6	10	5	28
5th	Zinedine Zidane	France	(Spain) Real Madrid	71	6	4	5	3	4	22
6th	Samuel Eto'o	Cameroon	(Spain) Barcelona	67	2	3	9	6	6	26
7th	Miroslav Klose	Germany	(Germany) Werder Bremen	29	-	1	4	4	5	14
8th	Didier Drogba	Ivory Coast	(England) Chelsea	25	-	1	3	5	2	11
9th	Andrea Pirlo	Italy	(Italy) AC Milan	17	-	2	1	2	2	7
10th	Jens Lehmann	Germany	(England) Arsenal	13	1	1	-	2	-	4
11th	Deco	Portugal	(Spain) Barcelona	11	-	-	2	2	1	5
11th	Kaká	Brazil	(Italy) AC Milan	11	-	-	1	2	4	7
13th	Franck Ribéry	France	(France) Marseille	9	-	1	-	-	5	6
14th	Gennaro Gattuso	Italy	(Italy) AC Milan	5	1	-	-	-	-	1
14th	Patrick Vieira	France	(Italy) Juventus (Italy) Inter Milan	5	-	1	-	-	1	9
14th	Cristiano Ronaldo	Portugal	(England) Manchester United	5	-	-	1	-	2	3
17th	Frank Lampard	England	(England) Chelsea	3	-	-	1	-	-	1
17th	Lukas Podolski	Germany	(Germany) 1. FC Köln (Germany) Bayern Munich	3	-	-	1	-	-	1
17th	Carles Puyol	Spain	(Spain) Barcelona	3	-	-	-	-	3	3
20th	Juninho	Brazil	(France) Lyon	2	-	-	-	1	-	1
20th	Lionel Messi	Argentina	(Spain) Barcelona	2	-	-	-	1	-	1
20th	Luca Toni	Italy	(Italy) Fiorentina	2	-	-	-	1	-	1
20th	John Terry	England	(England) Chelsea	2	-	-	-	-	2	2
20th	Gianluca Zambrotta	Italy	(Italy) Juventus (Spain) Barcelona	2	-	-	-	-	2	2
25th	Philipp Lahm	Germany	(Germany) Bayern Munich	1	-	-	-	-	1	1
25th	David Villa	Spain	(Spain) Valencia	1	-	-	-	-	1	1

=== Non-voted players ===
The following 24 players were originally in contention for the 2006 Ballon d’Or, but did not receive any votes:

Player	Nationality	Club(s)
Michael Ballack	Germany	(Germany) Bayern Munich (England) Chelsea
Tim Cahill	Australia	(England) Everton
Joe Cole	England	(England) Chelsea
Grégory Coupet	France	(France) Lyon
Cris	Brazil	(France) Lyon
Mahamadou Diarra	Mali	(Spain) Real Madrid
Michael Essien	Ghana	(England) Chelsea
Cesc Fàbregas	Spain	(England) Arsenal
William Gallas	France	(England) Chelsea (England) Arsenal
Steven Gerrard	England	(England) Liverpool
Ludovic Giuly	France	(Spain) Barcelona
Fabio Grosso	Italy	(Italy) Palermo (Italy) Inter Milan
Claude Makélélé	France	(England) Chelsea
Florent Malouda	France	(France) Lyon
Édison Méndez	Ecuador	(Ecuador) LDU Quito (Netherlands) PSV Eindhoven
Juan Román Riquelme	Argentina	(Spain) Villarreal
Arjen Robben	Netherlands	(England) Chelsea
Wayne Rooney	England	(England) Manchester United
Willy Sagnol	France	(Germany) Bayern Munich
Bastian Schweinsteiger	Germany	(Germany) Bayern Munich
Andriy Shevchenko	Ukraine	(Italy) AC Milan (England) Chelsea
Lilian Thuram	France	(Italy) Juventus (Spain) Barcelona
Tiago	Portugal	(France) Lyon
Fernando Torres	Spain	(Spain) Atlético Madrid
