= Luis Alberti (actor) =

Mexican actor

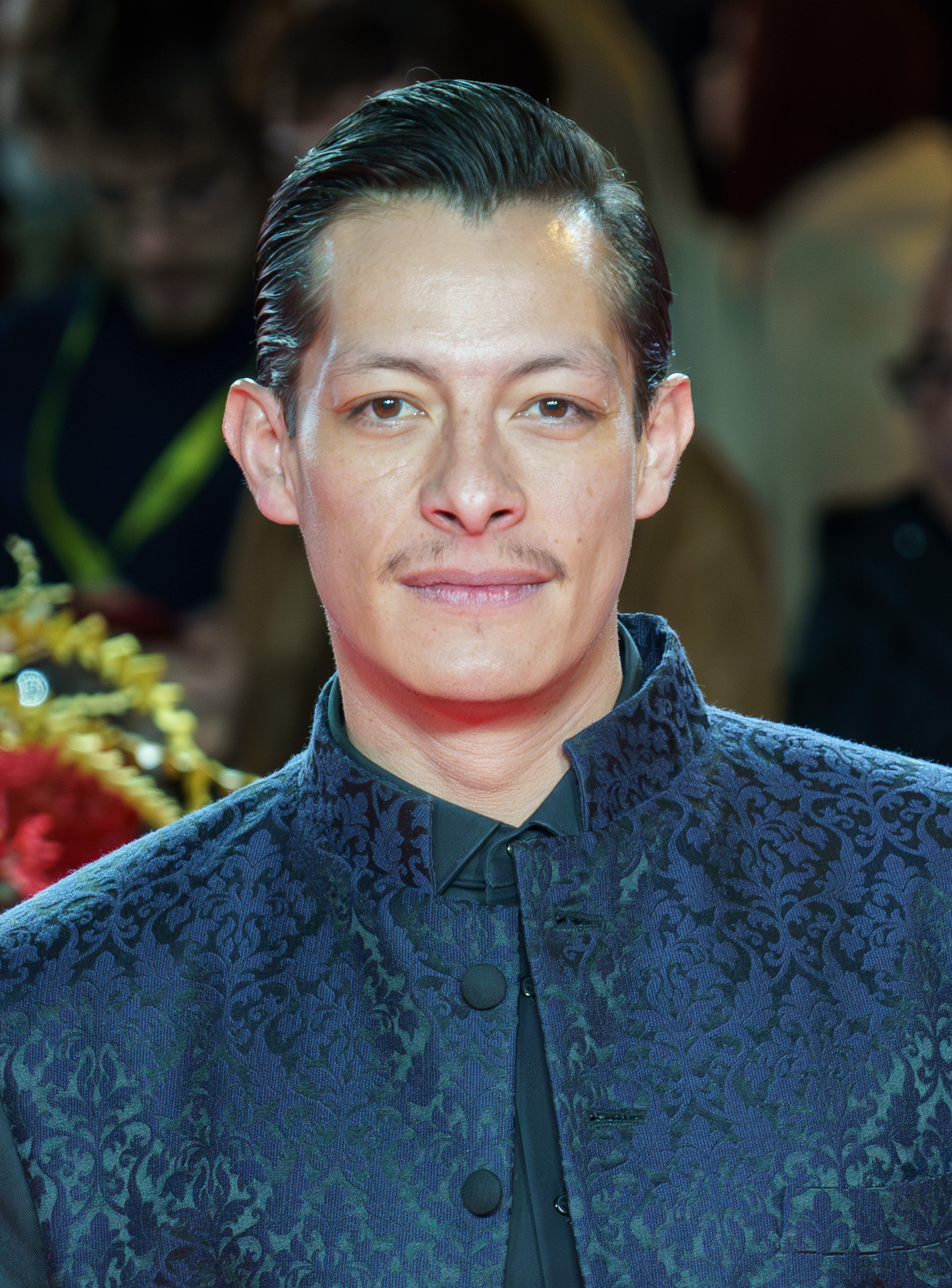
- Alberti in 2025
- Born: 30 October 1981 (age 44); Mexico City, Mexico
- Occupation: Actor
- Years active: 2011–present

Luis Alberti (born 30 October 1981) is a Mexican actor. He studied acting at La Casa del Teatro, and stood out in the film Eisenstein in Guanajuato, and later in Encarnación. On television it was highlighted by series as Rosario Tijeras (2016–2017), El César (2017), and widely known to play as the Mexican singer José Guadalupe Esparza, in the biographical series Bronco: The Series. More recently he is playing as Murcielago Captain, Guerrero Armando in military and action film Counterstrike (2025).

== Filmography ==
=== Films roles ===
Year	Title	Roles	Notes
2013	The Golden Dream	Man with Machete	
2013	El lado oscuro de la luz	Celeste	
2014	Eddie Reynolds y los ángeles de acero	Wedding Groom	
2014	Carmin Tropical	Modesto	Nominated - Ariel Award for Best Supporting Actor
2015	Eisenstein in Guanajuato	Palomino Cañedo	
2015	The Similars	Policeman	
2015	A Selfie	Mandrake	Short film
2016	Charity	Daniel	
2017	Encarnación	Ezequiel	Short film
2017	Pico de Orizaba	Unknown	Short film
2017	Otro muerto	Lázaro	Short film
2017	Polar Bear	Manager	
2018	Guilt	Unknown	Short film
2018	Fireflies	Guillermo	
2019	Love Me Not	Hiroshima	
2019	Workforce (Mano de obra)	Francisco	Ariel Award for Best Actor
2010	I Carry You with Me (Te Llevo Conmigo)	Cucusa	
2025	Counterstrike	Captain Guerrero	
TBA	The Blue Mauritius	Dominique Díaz	Pre-production

=== Television roles ===
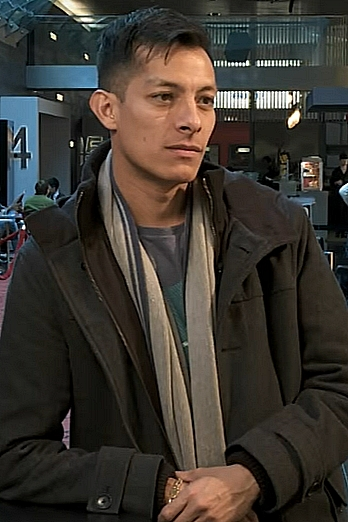
Alberti in an interview about the film Eisenstein in Guanajuato

Year	Title	Roles	Notes
2011	El Equipo	El Yayo	Episode: "La escritora"
2012	Pacientes	Guitar seller	Episode: "Todos se van"
2013	La vida de una diva	Palillo	1 episode
2014	Crónica de Castas	El Pollo	2 episodes
2014	Sr. Ávila	Thief	2 episodes
2014	Yo no creo en los hombres	Unknown	9 episodes
2015	Como dice el dicho	Roco	Episode: "El que calla, otorga"
2016	Perseguidos	Ramos	5 episodes
2016–2017	Rosario Tijeras	Brandon López Morales	Main role (season 1); 58 episodes
2017	El César	Maiko	Recurring role; 27 episodes
2018	El secreto de Selena	Gustavo	Episode: "Atrapada"
2018	Narcos: Mexico	Verdin	2 episodes
2019	Jugar con fuego	Poncho	Main role; 9 episodes
2019	Bronco: The Series	José Guadalupe Esparza	Lead role; 13 episodes
2020	Enemigo íntimo	Javier Rivera	Main role (season 2)
