= Counterattack (disambiguation) =

A counterattack is a military tactic.

"Counter-Attack" and other variations also may refer to:

- Counter-Attack (poem) (1918), by Siegfried Sassoon
- Counter-Attack, a 1945 film set in World War II
- 1941: Counter Attack, a video arcade game
- Counterattack, a right-wing American journal published from 1945–1955

== See also ==
- Counterstrike (disambiguation)
