= Counterstrike (2025 film) =

- Netflix release poster
- Contraataque
- Directed by: Chava Cartas
- Written by: Jose Ruben Escalante Mendez
- Produced by: Fransisco Gonzalez Compean; Sebastian Jurado
- Starring: Luis Alberti; Noe Hernandez; Leonardo Alonso; Luis Curiel; David Leon; Guillermo Nava
- Cinematography: Beto Casillas
- Edited by: Sam Baixauli; Carlos Silva Vallejo
- Music by: Victor Stumphfauser
- Production company: Draco films
- Distributed by: Netflix
- Release date: February 28, 2025
- Country: Mexico
- Language: Spanish

Counterstrike (Spanish: Contraataque), also known as Counterattack, is a 2025 Mexican action thriller film directed by Chava Cartas and written by Jose Ruben Escalante Mendez. Starring Luis Alberti, Noe Hernandez, Leonardo Alonso, Luis Curiel, David Leon and Guillermo Nava. It was released worldwide on Netflix on 28 February 2025.

== Plot ==
A mother and daughter, when stopping for a short break after driving, see a mass grave site. Captain Armando Guerrero and his group rescue the women from being kidnapped by gangsters. The mother tells Capt. Guerrero about this grave site and an investigation reveals that it is that of soldiers who died fighting drug cartel leader Josefo Urías. As the army plans an attack on the gang, the women are kidnapped again.

Josefo, along with his brother Sacristán, declare war on the soldiers. Capt. Guerrero and his people are ambushed, but manage to kill their assailants, including Sacristán. They unlock his phone, call the army and decide to meet up at the Brownsville checkpoint. Josefo is angry to see his brother dead, and sends nine people to kill Capt. Guerrero, but fails.

Capt. Guerrero decides to ambush the gang's hideout. They kill a few men and free the mother and daughter. As they get ready to leave the place, they are shot at by the gang. Pollo is wounded, and the women are armed with guns found at the hideout. The gang uses an M2 Browning to shoot the group down, but the soldiers survive the shots and start a counterattack. The gang attempt to enter the house via a tunnel, but Dámaso sacrifices himself to kill them by grenade.

The soldiers finally corner Josefo, but Pollo is killed by Josefo. Josefo and Capt. Guerrero decide to settle the dispute by hand-to-hand combat. Josefo is defeated, but Capt. Guerrero spares his life.

The remaining men and women are airlifted back to safety.

== Cast ==
- Luis Alberti as Armando, the captain of squad
- Noe Hernandez as Josefo, the cartel
- Leonardo Alonso as Damaso, part of Armando squad
- Luis Curiel as Pollo
- David Leon as Combo
- Guillermo Nava as Toro
- Mayra Batalla as Lucia
- Ishbel Bautista as La Cobra
