= Julien Doré =

French singer-songwriter and actor

- Doré in 2025

Background information
- Born: 7 July 1982 (age 44); Alès, France
- Genres: Pop; folk
- Occupations: Singer-songwriter; Actor
- Years active: 2007–present
- Label: Sony BMG
- Website: juliendoreofficiel.com

Julien Doré (French pronunciation: [ʒyljɛ̃ dɔʁe]; born 7 July 1982) is a French singer-songwriter, musician and actor.

He is the winner of the fifth season of the television show Nouvelle Star, aired on the French Television M6 channel.

== Life ==
Doré was born in Alès (Gard, Occitanie), and grew up in Lunel. After taking his baccalauréat littéraire at the college Louis Feuillade, he attended the École des Beaux-Arts of Nîmes for five years. He is the founder of the band Dig up Elvis. In 2006, he created with Guillaume de Molina the project "The Jean d'Ormesson disco suicide", "protean group" which covered pop and disco hits. In June 2007, Doré was voted number one in French Elle Magazine's "15 Sexiest Men" poll. He dated Louise Bourgoin, but the two separated in March 2009.

== Nouvelle Star ==
In 2007, Doré was selected at the casting session in Marseille for the fifth season of the music competition Nouvelle Star, where he presented himself with a ukulele. At the beginning, he only participated in the casting to get free publicity for his band. He convinced the jury when he sang "A la faveur de l'automne" (originally by Tété). His most memorable performances and revelations were while singing "Moi... Lolita" (Alizée) and "...Baby One More Time" (Britney Spears), dance music songs, in acoustics. He won the finale against Tigane.

Week	Song Choice	Original Artist	Result
Open Audition	"A la faveur de l'automne"	Tété	-
Open Audition – 2nd song	"Funny Fishy Pussy"	The Jean d'Ormesson Disco Suicide	3 vote "Yes" out of 4
Theatre auditions – day 1	"Creep"	Radiohead	Safe
Theatre auditions – day 2 (trio)	"Du côté de chez Swann"	Dave	Safe
Theatre auditions – day 3	"A la faveur de l'automne"	Tété	Safe
Top 15	"Like a Virgin"	Madonna	Safe
Top 13	"Les Mots bleus"	Christophe	Safe
Top 10	"Heartbreak Hotel"	Elvis Presley	Safe
Top 9	"Comme d'habitude" ("My Way")	Claude François	Safe
Top 8	"Light my Fire"	The Doors	Safe
Top 7	"Moi... Lolita"	Alizée	Safe
Top 6 – 1st song	"Strangers in the Night"	Frank Sinatra	-
Top 6 – 2nd song	"Mourir sur scène"	Dalida	Safe
Top 5 – 1st song	"I Put a Spell on You"	Screamin' Jay Hawkins	-
Top 5 – 2nd song	"Le Coup de soleil"	Richard Cocciante	Safe
Top 4 – 1st song	"...Baby One More Time"	Britney Spears	-
Top 4 – 2nd song	"Les Bêtises"	Sabine Paturel	Safe
Top 3 – 1st song	"Tainted Love"	Gloria Jones	-
Top 3 – 2nd song	"Vanina"	Dave	Safe
Top 2 – 1st song	"Smells Like Teen Spirit"	Nirvana	-
Top 2 – 2nd song	"You Really Got Me"	The Kinks	-
Top 2 – 3rd song	"Le Mal Aimé"	Claude François	Winner

== Career ==
Doré has had a successful musical career after winning Nouvelle Star with three studio albums, Ersatz (2008), Bichon (2011) and Løve (2013), all reaching top four on the official French Albums Chart. He has also gained chart success in Belgium and Switzerland. In 2009, he recorded a duet with Cœur de Pirate of her song, "Pour un infidèle." A video was released to promote the song, showing the two as a 1960s-era celebrity couple. Also in 2009, Doré recorded the song "Helsinki" with French singer Mélanie Pain. Doré also collaborated with French chanteuse Sylvie Vartan on her 2010 album release, Soleil bleu.

He was a guest coach for candidates Quentin Bruno and Law on Season 4 of The Voice: la plus belle voix the French version of the reality television singing competition The Voice.

== Discography ==
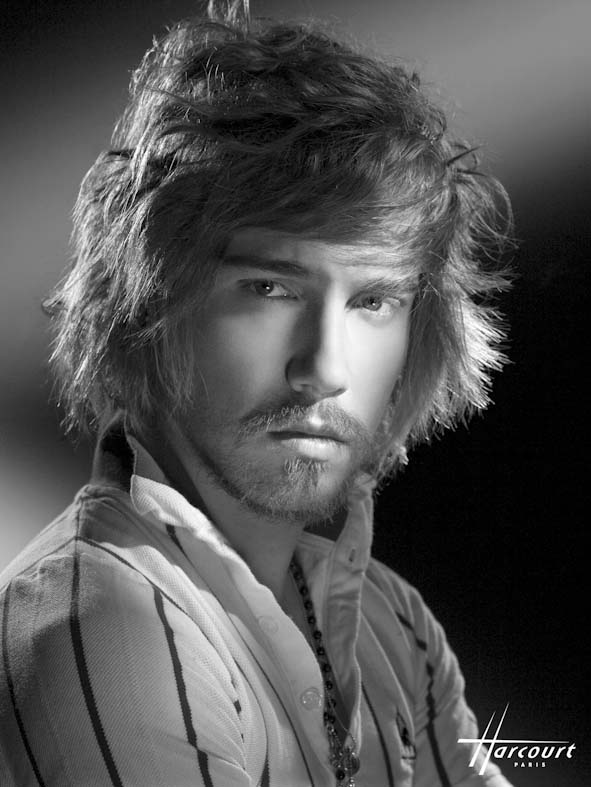
Doré in 2008

=== Albums ===
Studio

Year	Title	Chart positions			Certification
Year	Title	FRA	BEL (Wa)	SWI	Certification
2008	Ersatz: Released: 16 June 2008; Sony BMG	2	2	4	SNEP: Gold
2011	Bichon: Released: 21 March 2011; Sony BMG	4	4	16	SNEP: Gold
2013	Løve: Released: 28 October 2013; Columbia / Sony BMG	4	9	21	SNEP: 3× Platinum
2016	&: Released: 14 October 2016; Columbia / Sony BMG	1	1	3	SNEP: Diamond
2018	Vous & moi: Released: 2 March 2018; Sony BMG	2	2	10	SNEP: Gold
2020	Aimée: Released: 4 September 2020; Sony BMG	1	1	4	SNEP: 3× Platinum
2024	Imposteur: Released: 8 November 2024	1	1	3	

Live albums

Year	Album	Chart positions	
Year	Album	FRA	BEL (Wa)
2015	Løve Live: Released: 6 February 2015; Columbia	11	12

Others

- 2014: Piano Sølo (limited edition, FR (SNEP): Peak #110)

=== EPs ===
Year	Album	Notes
2009	Julien Doré & The Bash EP	Also available as part of Bichon release

=== Soundtracks ===
- 2010: Holiday

=== DVDs ===
- 2015: Løve Live DVD

=== Singles ===
Year	Title	Chart peak positions			Album
Year	Title	FRA	BEL (Wa)	SWI	Album
2007	"Moi... Lolita"	2	1	20	
2008	"Les Limites"	15	10	48	Ersatz
2008	"Figures Imposées" (with Morgane Imbeaud)	—	22* (Ultratip)	—	Ersatz
2008	"De mots" (with Arno)	—	18* (Ultratip)	—	Ersatz
2009	"First Lady"	—	22* (Ultratip)	—	Ersatz
2009	"Pour un infidèle" (Cœur de pirate & Julien Doré)	1	8	43	Cœur de pirate
2011	"Kiss Me Forever"	33	12	—	Bichon
2011	"L'été summer"	12	15* (Ultratip)	—	Bichon
2012	"Laisse Avril"	—	39* (Ultratip)	—	Bichon
2013	"Paris-Seychelles"	11	39	—	Løve
2013	"Viborg"	160	—	—	Løve
2013	"On attendra l'hiver"	33	9* (Ultratip)	—	Løve
2014	"Chou wasabi" (featuring Micky Green)	15	12	—	Løve
2016	"Le lac"	1	3	72	&
2016	"Sublime & Silence"	17	7	—	&
2016	"Porto Vecchio"	42	19	—	&
2016	"Coco Câline"	14	2	—	&
2020	"La fièvre"	73	7	—	Aimée
2020	"Nous"	45	7	—	Aimée
2021	"Waf" (featuring Simone & Jean-Marc)	—	15	—	Aimée
2024	"Beau" (with Joseph Kamel)	35	9	—	Non-album singles
2024	"Toutes les femmes de ta vie"	—	30	—	Non-album singles
2025	"Les démons de minuit"	—	50	—	Non-album singles
2025	"Viens on essaie" (with Vitaa)	—	10	—	Non-album singles

*Did not appear in the official Belgian Ultratop 50 charts, but rather in the bubbling under Ultratip charts.

=== Other songs ===
Year	Single	Chart peak positions	Album
Year	Single	FRA	Album
2014	"Week-end à Rome"	199	
2016	"Mon écho"	111	&
2016	"Corail" (feat. Juliette Armanet)	143	&
2020	"Kiki"	188	Aimée
2020	"Barracuda I"	191	Aimée

== Filmography ==
Year	Title	Role	Notes
2009	Écrire pour un chanteur	The Young Man	TV series
2010	Ensemble, nous allons vivre une très, très grande histoire d'amour...	Nicolas	
2010	Vampires	Jean-Paul	
2011	Le cri cosmique	Eugène B.	Short film
2013	Pop Redemption	Alex	
2013	Chez nous c'est trois!	L'acteur de Baisers fanés	
2017	Call My Agent !	Himself	TV series (7 episodes)
2023-2025	Panda	Victor Pandaloni	TV series (12 episodes)
