= Pinocchio (disambiguation) =

Pinocchio is a character from the 1883 novel The Adventures of Pinocchio

Pinocchio may also refer to:

== Film ==
- Pinocchio (1940 film), the Walt Disney Animation Studios animated film
- Pinocchio (1967 film), an East German film
- Pinocchio (1968 film), a Hallmark Hall of Fame live-action TV special
- Pinocchio (2002 film), a live-action production starring Roberto Benigni and Carlo Giuffrè
- Pinocchio (2012 film), an Italian animated production from Enzo D'Alò
- Pinocchio (2019 film), an Italian feature adaptation directed by Matteo Garrone, starring Federico Ielapi and Roberto Benigni
- Pinocchio: A True Story, a 2021 Russian animated film
- Pinocchio (2022 live-action film), directed by Robert Zemeckis, starring Tom Hanks and Benjamin Evan Ainsworth
- Guillermo del Toro's Pinocchio, a 2022 animated film co-directed by Guillermo del Toro and Mark Gustafson

== Television ==
- Pinocchio (1957 TV program), live-action adaptation starring Mickey Rooney
- Pinocchio: The Series, a 1972 anime adaptation from the Tatsunoko Production studio
- Pinocchio (1976 TV program), a live-action adaptation starring Sandy Duncan and Danny Kaye
- Pinocchio (miniseries), a 2008 live-action adaptation starring Robbie Kay and Bob Hoskins
- Pinocchio (2014 TV series), a Korean television series
- "Pinocchio", a 1984 episode of the live-action TV series Faerie Tale Theatre
- "Pinocchio", a 2009 episode of the animated TV series Super Why!

== Characters ==
- Pinocchio (Disney character), a character from the 1940 Disney film Pinocchio
- Pinocchio (Fables), a character from the Fables comic book series
- Pinocchio (Once Upon a Time), a character from the ABC television series Once Upon a Time
- Pinocchio (Shrek), a character from the Shrek media franchise
- Pinocchio, a character from the 2002 manga series Gunslinger Girl
- Mike Pinocchio, character from the 1999 live-action TV series Harsh Realm

== Music ==
=== Stage productions ===
- Pinocchio (opera), a 2017 French-language opera
- Pinocchio (play), 2017, featuring the songs from the 1940 Disney film
- Pinocchio, a 1996 Seattle musical by Chad Henry and Stevie Kallos

=== Artists ===
- Pin-Occhio, an Italian electronic band
- Pinocchio (virtual singer), a fictional French animated character and singer

=== Albums and soundtracks ===
- Pinocchio (album), a 2011 Korean-language album from the girl group F(x)
- Pinocchio (1940 soundtrack)
- Pinocchio (2022 live-action film soundtrack), a 2022 soundtrack album from the Disney film
- Guillermo del Toro's Pinocchio (soundtrack), 2022, from the Netflix film
- Pinocchio, a 2002 album by Italian band Pooh

=== Songs ===
- "Pinocchio" (instrumental), 1972, composed by Fiorenzo Carpi
- "Pinocchio (Danger)", a 2011 single by f(x)
- "Pinocchio", a 1970 single by Maria Dallas
- "Pinocchio", a 1979 single by Brian and Michael
- "Pinocchio", a song by Miles Davis from the 1968 album Nefertiti
- "Pinocchio", a song by Manu Chao from the 2002 album Radio Bemba Sound System
- "Pinocchio Story", a song by Kanye West from the 2008 album 808s & Heartbreak

== Other ==
- 12927 Pinocchio, an asteroid
- Pinocchio (spider), a genus of cellar spiders
- Pinocchio (video game), a 1996 platformer based on the 1940 Disney film
- Pinocchio paradox, a version of the liar paradox
- Piel CP-20 Pinocchio, an aircraft
- "Pinocchios", a rating system used by Glenn Kessler in political fact checking for The Washington Post

== See also ==
- Pinocchio Unstrung, a 2026 film by Rhys Frake-Waterfield
- The Adventures of Pinocchio (disambiguation)
- The New Adventures of Pinocchio (disambiguation)
