= Mon Alboum! =

Studio album by Pinocchio
- Released: November 2005
- Genre: Pop, children's music
- Language: French
- Label: Lavista / EMI Label One (EMI Music France)
- Producer: Bruno Berrebi

Pinocchio chronology
Mon Alboum! (2005)	Magic Pinocchio (2007)

Mon Alboum! is the debut album by French virtual singer Pinocchio, released by EMI Music France in November 2005.

The album debuted at number 38 in France, peaking at number 35 the following week.

== Track listing ==
No.	Title	Length
1.	"Mon Alboum" (Intro)
2.	"T'es pas cap Pinocchio"
3.	"Pinocchio en hiver"
4.	"Qui"
5.	"La différence n'existe pas"
6.	"Mon cœur fait boom boom"
7.	"DJ Pinocchio"
8.	"La chanson du kazoo"
9.	"Happy Birthday to You"
10.	"Petit Papa Noël"
11.	"Sous la neige étoilée"
12.	"Pinocchio en hiver" (Fin)
13.	"T'es pas cap Pinocchio" (Karaoké)
14.	"Pinocchio en hiver" (Karaoké)

== Charts ==
Chart (2005)	Peak position
Belgian Albums (Ultratop Wallonia)	11
French Albums (SNEP)	35
