= Løve (Julien Doré album) =

2013 studio album by Julien Doré

Studio album by Julien Doré
- Released: 28 October 2013
- Label: Columbia, Sony BMG

Julien Doré chronology
Bichon (2011)	Løve (2013)	Løve Live (2015)

Løve is the third studio album by French singer Julien Doré, released through Columbia/Sony BMG on 28 October 2013. The album peaked at number four on the French Album Chart.

On 12 September 2015, a special 2 CD release was made being the albums Løve and Bichon. That joint release peaked at number 118 on the French Album Chart

== Track listing ==
No.	Title	Length
1.	"Viborg"	3:58
2.	"Paris-Seychelles"	3:17
3.	"Habemus papaye" (featuring Brigitte)	3:10
4.	"Hôtel Thérèse"	3:12
5.	"Heaven"	3:18
6.	"Chou wasabi" (featuring Micky Green)	3:39
7.	"Platini"	3:44
8.	"London nous aime"	3:09
9.	"Mon apache"	3:23
10.	"On attendra l'hiver"	3:33
11.	"Corbeau blanc"	4:54
12.	"Balto"	3:28

== Charts ==
Chart (2013)	Peak position
Belgian Albums Chart (Ultratop Wallonia)	9
French Albums	4
Swiss Albums (Schweizer Hitparade)	21

== Release history ==
Region	Date	Format	Label
France	28 October 2013	CD, digital download	Columbia/Sony BMG

== Løve Live ==
Løve Live

Live album by Julien Doré
- Released: 9 February 2015
- Label: Columbia, Sony BMG

Julien Doré chronology
Løve (2013)	Løve Live (2015)	& (2016)

Løve Live is the follow-up 2015 album of Julien Doré being his first live album. The album was released on Columbia/Sony BMG on 9 February 2015.

=== Live album Track listing ===
No.	Title	Length
1.	"Viborg"	7:55
2.	"Hotel Thérèse"	4:57
3.	"Chou Wasabi"	4:07
4.	"Kiss Me Forever"	5:41
5.	"Femme Like U"	2:09
6.	"Balto"	3:41
7.	"Winnipeg"	7:04
8.	"Paris-Seychelles"	4:07
9.	"Platini"	4:54
10.	"Bleu Canard"	4:19
11.	"Mon Apache"	6:06
12.	"On attendra l'hiver"	5:00
13.	"Corbeau blanc"	11:32

=== Charts ===
Chart (2015)	Peak position
Belgian Albums Chart (Ultratop Wallonia)	12
French Albums	11

== Løve Live DVD ==
The live performance was also released as a DVD.

=== Track listing ===
No.	Title	Length
1.	"Viborg"	7:51
2.	"Hotel Thérèse"	4:51
3.	"Habemus papaye"	3:29
4.	"London nous aime"	3:12
5.	"Chou Wasabi"	4:06
6.	"Kiss Me Forever"	5:40
7.	"Femme Like U"	2:09
8.	"Balto"	3:36
9.	"Heaven"	3:08
10.	"Winnipeg"	7:02
11.	"Les Limites"	4:23
12.	"Paris-Seychelles"	3:08
13.	"Platini"	4:55
14.	"Bleu canard"	4:44
15.	"On attendra l’hiver"	4:42
16.	"Corbeau blanc"	11:55
17.	"Mon apache"	6:04
18.	"I Need Someone"	4:29
