= Ersatz (album) =

Studio album by Julien Doré
- Released: 16 June 2008
- Label: Sony BMG

Julien Doré chronology
Ersatz (2008)	Bichon (2011)

Ersatz is the debut album by French singer Julien Doré, winner of the fifth season of the television show Nouvelle Star. The album was released worldwide on 16 June 2008 on Sony BMG. It entered the French charts at number 2 and stayed in the top 200 for almost two years. Tracks 1 and 5 were written by Mark Daumail of Cocoon and featured Cocoon's other half, Morgan Imbeaud. The final track featured a duo with veteran Belgian rocker Arno.

== Track listing ==
No.	Title	Writer(s)	Length
1.	"Acacia" (with Morgane Imbeaud)	M. Imbeaud & Marc Daumail	3:05
2.	"Les Bords de mer"	J. Doré	3:38
3.	"Les Limites"	David Scrima	2:20
4.	"Bouche Pute"	J. Doré	4:53
5.	"Figures imposées" (with Morgane Imbeaud)	M. Imbeaud, M. Daumail	3:11
6.	"Dans tes rêves"	D. Scrima	1:46
7.	"Pudding morphina"	J. Doré	3:47
8.	"Piano Lys"	J. Doré	3:21
9.	"Soirées parisiennes"	Babx	3:07
10.	"J'aime pas"	Salo	4:15
11.	"First Lady"	Babx	3:35
12.	"SS in Uruguay"	S. Gainsbourg	2:12
13.	"Los Angeles"	J. Doré	2:23
14.	"De mots" (duo with Arno)	Arno Hintjens/Guillaume De Molina, J. Doré	4:02

== Singles released ==
1. "Les Limites" (2008)
2. "Figures Imposées" (2008)

== Charts ==
Chart performance for Ersatz
Chart (2008)	Peak position
Belgian Albums (Ultratop Wallonia)	2
French Albums (SNEP)	2
Swiss Albums (Schweizer Hitparade)	4

== Certifications ==
Certifications for Ersatz
Region	Certification	Certified units/sales
France (SNEP)	Gold	75,000^{*}
^{*} Sales figures based on certification alone.
