= Mon cœur fait boom boom =

Single by Marilou

from the album Mon Alboum!
- Released: March 27, 2006
- Genre: Pop
- Label: Lavista / EMI Label One (EMI Music France)
- Songwriter(s): Bruno Berrebi
- Producer(s): Bruno Berrebi

Pinocchio singles chronology
"Petit Papa Noël" (2005)	"Mon cœur fait boom boom" (2006)	"DJ Pinocchio" (2007)

Music video
- "Mon cœur fait boom boom" on YouTube

"Mon cœur fait boom boom" is a song by French virtual singer Marilou from her boyfriend Pinocchio's debut album, Mon Alboum! (2005). Released as the fourth single from that album in March 2006, the song reached number 33 in France.

== Track listing ==
CD single Lavista 946 3 55630 2 3 / EMI Label One, France)
No.	Title	Length
1.	"Mon cœur fait boom boom"	2:55
2.	"Mon cœur fait boom boom" (Club Remix)	4:11
3.	"Mon cœur fait boom boom" (Instrumentale)	2:55

== Charts ==
Chart (2006)	Peak position
Belgium (Ultratip Bubbling Under Wallonia)	5
France (SNEP)	33
