= Pinocchio en hiver (Kalinka) =

Single by Pinocchio

from the album Mon Alboum!
- Released: October 17, 2005
- Genre: Pop
- Length: 3:00
- Label: Lavista 0946 3 44148 0 7 / EMI Label One (EMI Music France)
- Songwriter(s): Bruno Berrebi
- Producer(s): Bruno Berrebi

Pinocchio singles chronology
"T'es pas cap Pinocchio" (2005)	"Pinocchio en hiver (Kalinka)" (2005)	"Petit Papa Noël" (2005)

Music video
- "Pinocchio en hiver (Kalinka)" on YouTube

"Pinocchio en hiver (Kalinka)" is a song by the French virtual singer Pinocchio. Released as a single in October 2005, it debuted at number 8 in France.

The song also appeared on Pinocchio's debut album, Mon Alboum!, which was released a month later.

== Track listing ==
CD single (Lavista 0946 3 44148 0 7 / EMI)
No.	Title	Length
1.	"Pinocchio en hiver" (Radio Edit)	3:00
2.	"Pinocchio en hiver" (Version instrumentale)	3:00
3.	"Pinocchio en hiver" (Vidéo compatible Mac/PC)	3:00

== Charts ==
Chart (2005)	Peak position
Belgium (Ultratop 50 Wallonia)	12
France (SNEP)	8
Switzerland (Schweizer Hitparade)	40
