= Flammes =

Greatest hits album by Niagara
- Released: April 9, 2002
- Recorded: 1985–1992; ICP Studios, Brussels; Studio Meredith, Saint-Nom-la-Bretèche; Studio Mikeli, Paris; Studio Plus XXX, Paris
- Genre: Pop, rock
- Label: Universal, Polydor
- Producer: Daniel Chenevez; Daniel Pabœuf

Niagara chronology
| La Vérité (1992) | Flammes (2002) |

Flammes is a 2002 compilation album by the French pop act Niagara, released nine years after the band broke up. It contains all the band's hit singles from its studio albums and was released in three formats: the classic edition with a single CD, a limited edition double CD with the second disc featuring the extended versions, and a deluxe box set including two CDs, a DVD of the group's music videos (except for "Tchiki Boum"), and a booklet with song lyrics and an overview of the band's history. This compilation topped the French Compilations Chart for three weeks and remained on the chart for 17 weeks (within the top 100). The DVD was also released as a stand-alone product.

== Track listing ==
CD

1. "J'ai vu" – 3:52
2. "Assez" – 3:44
3. "Je dois m'en aller" – 3:25
4. "Pendant que les champs brûlent" – 4:01
5. "Quand la ville dort" – 3:48
6. "Soleil d'hiver" – 4:10
7. "Tchiki boum" – 3:33
8. "L'amour à la plage" – 3:22
9. "Flammes de l'enfer" – 4:08
10. "Baby Louis" – 3:56
11. "Psychotrope" – 3:37
12. "Chemin de croix" – 4:35
13. "La fin des étoiles" – 3:50
14. "TV Addict" – 4:04
15. "Un million d'années" – 4:01
16. "La vie est peut-être belle" – 3:26
17. "Je n'oublierai jamais" – 3:35
18. "Le Minotaure" – 3:20

Second CD - Limited edition

1. "J'ai vu" (extended version) – 6:08
2. "Assez" (extended version) – 5:07
3. "Je dois m'en aller" (extended version) – 4:14
4. "Pendant que les champs brûlent" (extended version) – 6:11
5. "Quand la ville dort" (extended version) – 5:00
6. "Soleil d'hiver" (extended version) – 5:56
7. "Tchiki boum" (extended version) – 4:49
8. "L'amour à la plage" (extended version) – 4:36
9. "Flammes de l'enfer" (extended version) – 5:54
10. "Baby Louis" (extended version) – 5:39
11. "Psychotrope" (extended version) – 5:46
12. "La fin des étoiles" (extended version) – 5:09
13. "Un million d'années" (extended version) – 5:39
14. "Le Minotaure" (extended version) – 7:28

DVD - Long box - Limited edition

1. "Un million d'années" (video)
2. "J'ai vu" (video)
3. "Pendant que les champs brûlent" (video)
4. "Psychotrope" (video)
5. "La vie peut être belle" (video)
6. "Le Minotaure" (video)
7. "Baby Louis" (video)
8. "L'amour à la plage" (video)
9. "Soleil d'hiver" (video)
10. "Assez !" (video)
11. "Je dois m'en allez" (video)
12. "La fin des étoiles" (video)
13. "Quand la ville dort" (video)
14. "Flammes de l'enfer" (video)
15. Chemin de croix - Documentary including five live performances
16. Bonus : two storyboards, commentaries of the producer on two music videos

== Personnel ==
CD

- Written and composed by Laporte / Chevenez
- Mastering : Geoff Pesch (Townhouse)
- Photo : Fabrice Bouquet
- Booklet photos : Gilles Cappé, Catarina, Michel Figuet, Claude Gassian, Youri Lenquette, Eddie Monsoon, Lisa Peardon, Juergen Teller, Zigen
- Graphic design : Léa - Janvier
- Booklet design : Phil Design
- Management : Cyril Prieur
- Editions : Acide Music & Universal Music Publishing France

DVD

- Universal Project responsible : Philippe Zouari
- Production : CTN
- Project coordination : Carole Di Venosa
- Graphism : Cathy Cayeux
- Sound engineer : Aurélien Bony
- Authoring : Johan Viaene and Frédéric Cagan
- Mounting : Vincent Guttmann

== Charts ==
| Chart (2002) | Peak position |
|---|---|
| Belgian (Wallonia) Albums Chart | 23 |
| French Compilations Chart | 1 |
| Swiss Albums Chart | 54 |

| Year-end chart (2002) | Position |
|---|---|
| French Compilations Chart | 22 |
