= Yvette Horner =

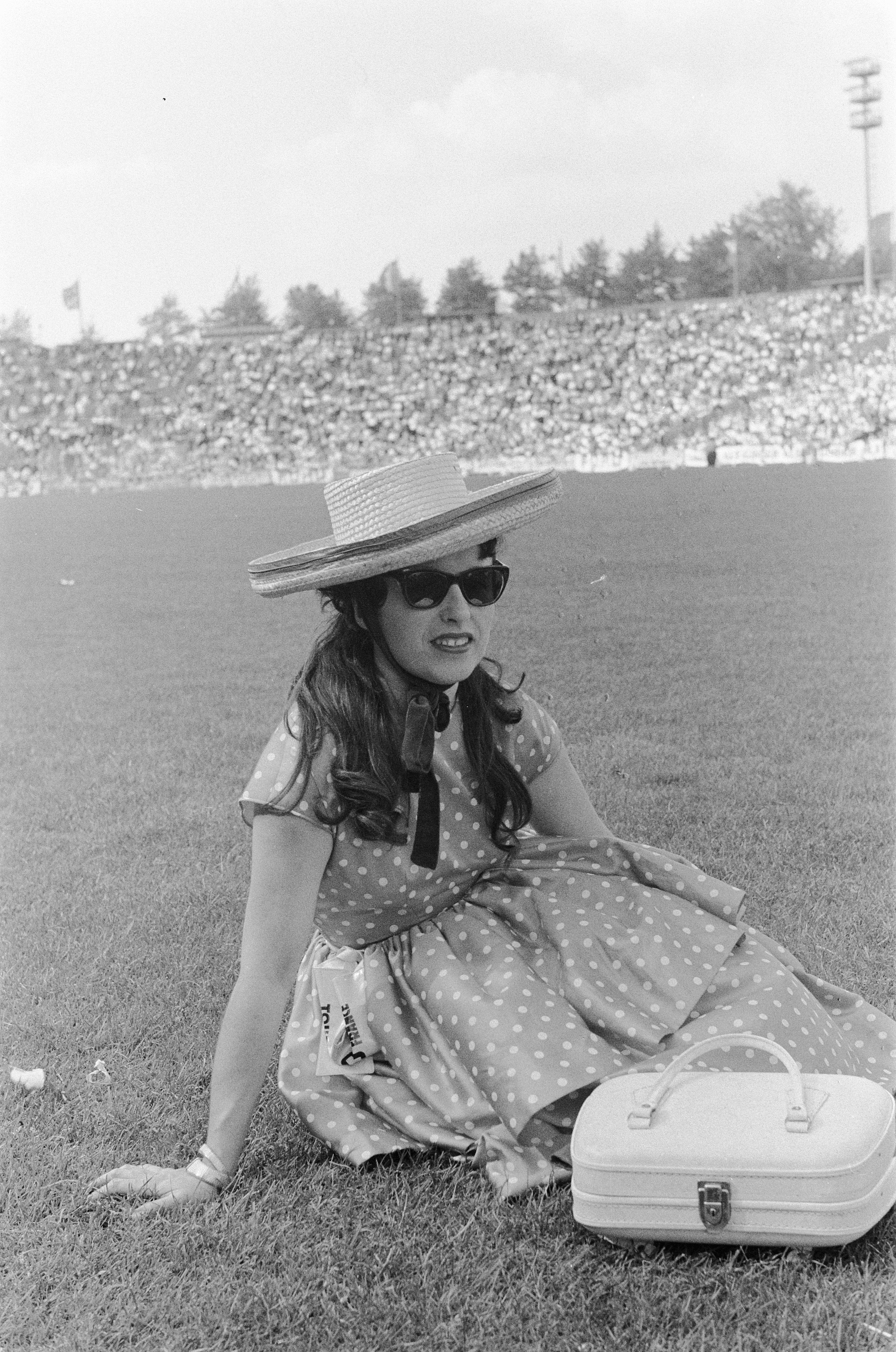
- Yvette Horner in 1960.

Background information
- Also known as: Vévette
- Born: Yvette Marie Eugénie Hornère; 22 September 1922; Tarbes (France)
- Died: 11 June 2018 (aged 95) Courbevoie (France)
- Genres: bal-musette
- Occupation: Musician
- Instruments: Accordion; piano
- Years active: 1940–2011
- Labels: Pathé-Marconi; CBS Records International; Erato Records
- Website: yvettehorsnorme.com

Yvette Horner (née Hornère; 22 September 1922 – 11 June 2018) was a French accordionist, pianist and composer known for performing with the Tour de France during the 1950s and 1960s. During her 70-year long career, she gave more than two thousand concerts and released around 150 records, selling a total of 30 million copies.

Horner won the Coupe mondiale de l'accordéon in 1948, and the Grand Prix du Disque in 1950 for Le Jardin secret d'Yvette Horner, a recital of classical works performed on piano and accordion.

== Biography ==
=== Early life ===
Yvette Hornère (who later adopted the surname Horner, at her mother's suggestion), spent a few years of her childhood in Rabastens-de-Bigorre, where her father, Louis Hornère, was a property developer. She was an only child. Her mother encouraged her to play music, and her teacher, Marguerite Lacoste, taught her her first notes on the piano. She studied music at the conservatory of Tarbes, then at the conservatory of Toulouse where, at the age of 11, she obtained a first prize in piano. Her mother convinced her to abandon her instrument for the chromatic accordion, explaining to her that there were no female accordionists, and that she would then be able to sustain herself. Throughout her life, Yvette Horner remained nostalgic for her first instrument, with which she recorded her prize-winning recital of classical works Le Jardin secret d'Yvette Horner, as well as performing many times as a pianist on TV shows. However, she made her débuts at the "Théâtre Impérial" in Tarbes (later renamed "Théâtre des Nouveautés"), which belonged to her paternal grandmother.

She played in Pyrenean casinos before moving to Paris, where she was a student of Robert Bréard.

=== First awards ===
In 1938, Yvette Horner participated, with Freddy Balta and André Lips, in the first accordion world championships organized in Paris, at the Moulin de la Galette, by the Confédération internationale des accordéonistes. She finished second after Freddy Balta.

She gave her first concert in 1947 in Paris and, in 1948, she was the first woman to win the Coupe mondiale de l'accordéon. She was awarded the Grand Prix International d'Accordion de Paris in 1953.

=== Artistic career ===
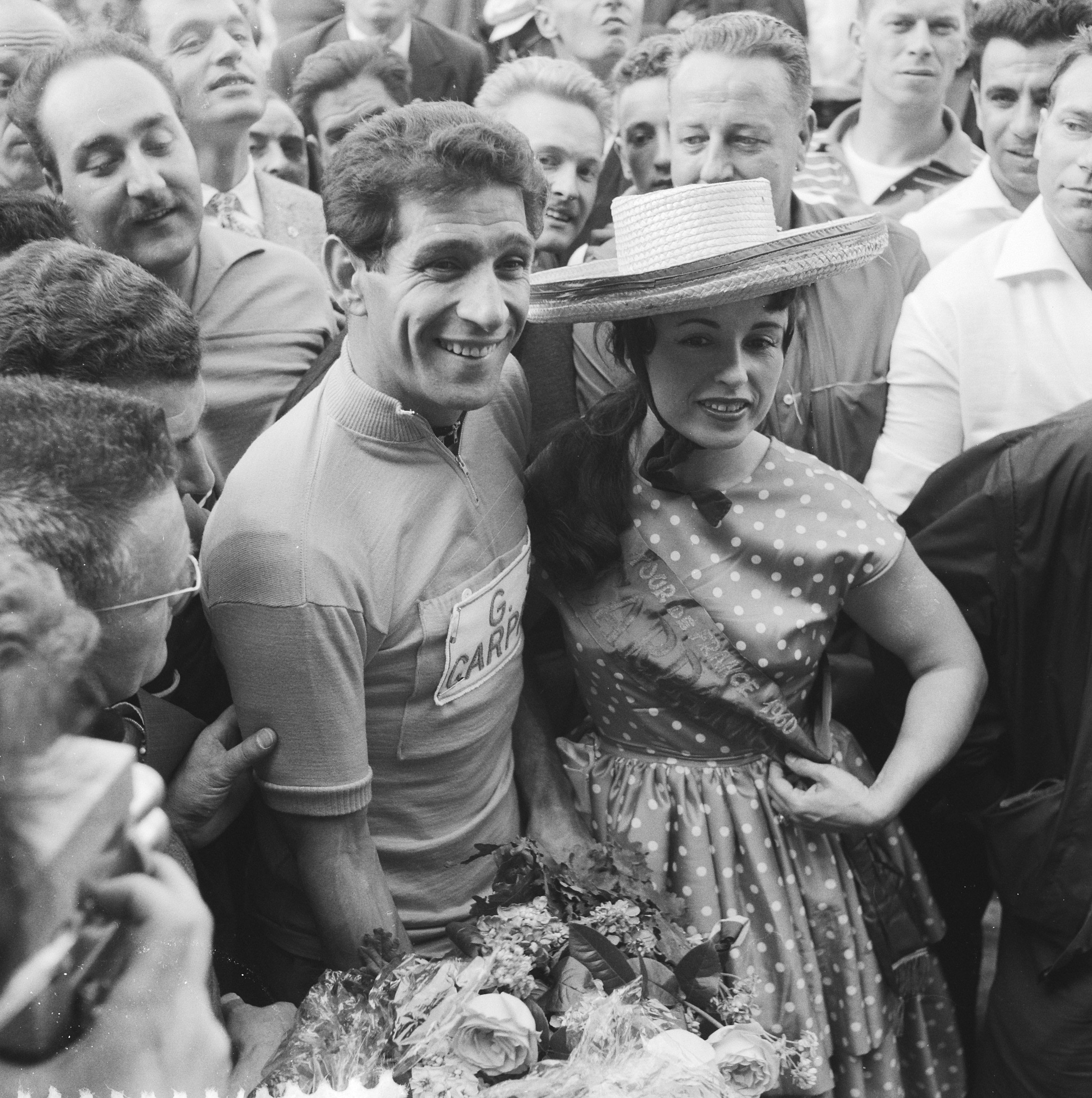
Yvette Horner alongside Gastone Nencini, on 28 June 1960, during the Tour de France

In 1950, she was awarded the Grand Prix du Disque de l'académie Charles-Cros for her album Le Jardin secret d'Yvette Horner, a recital of classical works performed on piano and accordion.

In 1952, the Calor company, sponsor of the Tour de France, offered her the opportunity to join the race, launching her career. She played on a podium at the finish of each stage. Wearing a sombrero and perched on the roof of a Citroën Traction Avant in the Suze brand colours, she repeated this in the following years, accompanying the Tour de France a total of eleven times, from 1952 to 1963. She was also the queen of the Six Days of Paris in 1954.

In the 1980s, she dyed her hair from brown to red and started wearing more extravagant stage outfits (such as the famous "Eiffel Tower Dress") created by fashion designer Jean-Paul Gaultier, who made her one of his muses.

In 1987, she became the godmother of the Doudeville Accordion Club, the Cany-Accordeon-Club, directed by its founder, Annie Lacour, who worked at the Schola Cantorum de Paris for five years.

In 1989, she took part in the celebrations of the bicentenary of the French Revolution by performing on the Place de la Bastille. The following year she starred in a revue at the Casino de Paris. In the 1990s, she appeared on stage with Marcel Azzola, then collaborated with choreographer Maurice Béjart when he staged Tchaikovsky's Nutcracker ballet at the Théâtre du Châtelet in 1999.

In 2005 her autobiography, Le Biscuit dans la poche, was published. In June 2006, the musician began a documentary on her life with Canadian director Damian Pettigrew. Her album Double d'Or was released in 2007. In 2009, she went on to take part in her La plus grande guinguette du monde tour.

In 2011, the accordionist is invited by singer Julien Doré to participate in the recording of his album Bichon. She also gave her last concert the same year. Her last album, called Hors Norme, is released in May 2012. It is produced by Patrick Brugalières. Guest artists include Lio, Didier Lockwood, Richard Galliano and Marcel Amont. The cover is illustrated by Jean-Paul Gaultier.

=== Death and burial ===
Yvette Horner died on 11 June 2018, at the age of 95. "She was not ill. She died after a full life," said her agent, Jean-Pierre Brun.

She is buried in the Saint-Jean cemetery in Tarbes. Nine months after her death, a bronze statue of Yvette Horner was placed on her funerary monument. She asked sculptor Yves Lacoste in 1994 to create this piece as a tribute to her public, her parents, her husband and those who helped her achieve fame. The final piece is life-size (1.54 m), with a Yvette Horner carried by applauding hands, emerging from a cocoon and grasping an accordion, a direct replica of the one she used for one of her favourite pieces.

=== Private life ===
The musician married René Droesch, hailing from Belfort, a footballer with the Girondins de Bordeaux, whom she met in 1936. Droesch interrupted his career to become her manager, her husband and to relieve her of "material worries". Yvette Horner expressed her regret at not having had children with her husband, who died in 1986.

In 2005, the accordionist sold her house in Nogent-sur-Marne, where she had lived for about fifty years. She auctioned off personal items at the Hôtel Drouot, including her collection of Jean Paul Gaultier dresses. The sale was held for the benefit of the Institut du cerveau et de la moelle épinière (ICM) and an association for the fight against cancer. After the sale of her Nogent house, the artist lived in an elderly people's residence in Paris.

== Musical style ==
According to Maurice Béjart, Yvette Horner "stands between the scholar and the popular". During her career, she has explored many musical styles, which led her to collaborate with classical pianist Samson François, jazz trumpeter Jac Berrocal, American harmonica player Charlie McCoy, with whom she recorded a country-inspired album in Nashville, and Culture Club lead singer Boy George, on a 1994 appearance on Taratata. In 1990, she even released a Eurodance-inspired single, Play Yvette, which she performed with DJ Andy Shafte.

== Tributes ==
Yvette Horner is an honorary citizen of Tarbes and Nogent-sur-Marne. The Yvette-Horner-Île-de-Beauté boardwalk, which runs along the Marne as part of a long-distance hiking trail, has been named after her in 2007. The foyer of the Théâtre des Nouveautés in Tarbes, a replica of Opéra Garnier's foyer, is named in her honour.

In 2008, the musical show La Madone des dancings, les mille vies d'Yvette Horner, adapted by Eudes Labrusse and staged by Dominique Verrier, was presented at Avignon as part of the "off" festival. It is inspired by the radio series Les Grandes Histoires d'Yvette, produced by Sylvie Gasteau and broadcast in 2005 by France Culture. The character of Yvette Horner is portrayed by the actress Antoinette Moya.

== Awards ==
=== Decorations ===
Yvette Horner received the commandeur de l'ordre national du Mérite necklet on April 17, 2002, given by the Minister of Culture and Communication Catherine Tasca.

She was named commandeur de la Légion d'honneur on 22 April 2011 in the portfolio of the Ministry of Culture and Communication, decorated on 28 September 2011 by French President Nicolas Sarkozy.

- Commandeur de la Légion d'honneur (2011); officier (1996); chevalier (1986)
- Commandeur de l'ordre national du Mérite (2002)

=== Prizes ===
- Coupe mondiale de l'accordéon (1948)
- Grand prix de l'Académie Charles-Cros (1950)
- Grand prix international d'accordéon de Paris (1953)

== Autobiography ==
- Horner, Yvette (2005). Le Biscuit dans la poche (in French). Éditions du Rocher. ISBN 978-2-268-05567-1.
