= Alice et Moi =

- Also known as: Alice V, Alice Vanor
- Born: Alice Vannoorenberghe; 29 June 1992 (age 33); Paris, France
- Genres: Electro pop, French pop
- Occupation: Singer-songwriter
- Years active: 2017–present
- Labels: L'œil dans la paume, Sony Music Entertainment France

Alice Vannoorenberghe, also known by her stage name Alice et Moi (Alice and Me) or Alice Vanor, is a French electropop singer-songwriter. She made her debut in 2017 with the release of her EP Filme Moi. Her first studio album Drama was released on 21 May 2021.

== Biography ==
=== Beginnings ===
Born in Paris, Alice began writing and singing at a young age, encouraged by her music-loving father, who was a member of a punk group in his adolescence. After finishing secondary school, Alice attended preparatory classes in literature and humanities and eventually obtained a master's degree in journalism at Sciences Po before starting the project of "Alice et Moi" in 2016. In October 2017, she independently released her first EP called Filme Moi, followed by Frénésie in 2019. Alice announced the name and tracklist of her debut studio album on 23 April 2021. The album, called Drama, was released on 21 May 2021 under Sony Music Entertainment France.

=== Eye and stage name ===
Alice remembers that at the age of fourteen or fifteen, she drew an eye on her hand. Ever since, the eye has signified creation to her and has encouraged her to feel better.

The name "Alice et Moi" references the duality of her personality. In an interview with Lemon, she explains that one side of her is a girl who is insecure about herself, while the other side, which, according to her, is more prevalent today, is a "very enthusiastic" girl, "who is not afraid of anything". Furthermore, she says that her stage name allows her fans to "share a bond" with her and to create intimacy by pronouncing the name.

== Discography ==
=== EPs ===
Credits adapted from Spotify.

Filme Moi (2017) (L'œil dans la paume)
No.	Title	Writer(s)	Length
1.	"Il y a"	Alice Vannoorenberghe, Ivan Sjoberg, JB Beurier	3:43
2.	"Filme moi"	Alice Vannoorenberghe, Ivan Sjoberg, JB Beurier	3:30
3.	"Cent fois"	Alice Vannoorenberghe, Ivan Sjoberg, JB Beurier	3:14
4.	"C'est toi qu'elle préfère"	Alice Vannoorenberghe, Ivan Sjoberg, JB Beurier	3:14
5.	"Éoliennes"	Alice Vannoorenberghe, Ivan Sjoberg, JB Beurier	4:16
Total length:			17:41

Frénésie (2019) (L'œil dans la paume)
No.	Title	Writer(s)	Length
1.	"J'veux sortir avec un rappeur"	Alice Vannoorenberghe, Ivan Sjoberg	3:29
2.	"T'es fait pour me plaire"	Alice Vannoorenberghe, Sjoberg, Jean-Baptiste Beurier	3:09
3.	"C'est de la frénésie"	Alice Vannoorenberghe, Sjoberg	2:53
4.	"Je suis all about you"	Alice Vannoorenberghe, Sjoberg	3:18
5.	"J'en ai rien à faire"	Alice Vannoorenberghe, Sjoberg	3:30
Total length:			16:19

=== Albums ===
Credits adapted from Spotify.

Drama (2021) (L'œil dans la paume, Sony Music Entertainment France)
No.	Title	Writer(s)	Producer(s)	Length
1.	"Je suis fan"	Alice et Moi, Ivan Sjoberg	Dani Terreur, Nino Vella	2:48
2.	"Foutez-moi la paix"	Alice et Moi, Terreur	Terreur	2:52
3.	"Karma"	Alice et Moi, Sjoberg	Terreur	3:15
4.	"C'est toi que je veux" (with Joanna)	Alice et Moi, Terreur, Joanna	Terreur	3:14
5.	"Les mots qui te font rêver"	Alice et Moi, Sjoberg	Terreur	3:26
6.	"Maman m'a dit"	Alice et Moi, Sjoberg	Terreur, Tristan Salvati, Elie Zylberman, Lamri	2:35
7.	"Tout va bien"	Alice et Moi, Terreur	Terreur, Nino Vella	2:27
8.	"Reine du drama"	Alice et Moi, Sjoberg	Terreur, Majeur Mineur, Shawondasee	3:05
9.	"Le pire de nous deux" (with Dani Terreur)	Alice et Moi, Terreur	Terreur	3:14
10.	"Les gens sont cools"	Alice et Moi, Sjoberg	Terreur	3:08
11.	"Démon"	Alice et Moi, Terreur	Terreur, Majeur Mineur, Shawondasee	4:02
12.	"T'aimerais que ce soit vrai"	Alice et Moi, Terreur, Sjoberg	Terreur, Majeur Mineur, Shawondasee	2:39
13.	"Sur mon lit"	Alice et Moi, Sjoberg	Terreur, Majeur Mineur, Shawondasee	3:19
14.	"Tout nus"	Alice et Moi, Ivan Sjoberg	Terreur	3:11
15.	"Danse avec moi"	Alice et Moi, Terreur	Terreur, Majeur Mineur, Shawondasee	2:47
16.	"J'veux sortir avec un rappeur – Summer"	Alice et Moi, Ivan Sjoberg	Terreur	3:30
Total length:				49:38

All lyrics are written by Alice et Moi and Dani Terreur; all production is by Dani Terreur.

Photographie (2023) (L'œil dans la paume, Sony Music Entertainment France)
No.	Title	Length
1.	"Ça me va"	3:09
2.	"La vie en bleu"	2:57
3.	"Photographies"	2:56
4.	"J'aime pas sortir"	2:52
5.	"Carabine"	3:21
6.	"La dolce vita"	2:23
7.	"L'incendie"	2:25
8.	"Devant toi"	32:36
9.	"Caramel"	2:46
10.	"Poison"	2:13
11.	"Je m'en vais"	3:43
Total length:		31:27

=== Singles ===
Title	Year of release	Album/EP	Note
Tu m'avais dit (Acoustic Version)	2018	—N/a	
J'veux sortir avec un rappeur	2018	Frénésie	A "Summer" version appears on the album Drama.
C'est de la frénésie	2019	Frénésie	
J'en ai rien à faire	2019	Frénésie	
L'Amour à la plage	2019	—N/a	Cover of the Niagara song
Je n'ai rien à faire	2020	—N/a	Variation on J'en ai rien à faire
T'aimerais que ce soit vrai	2020	Drama	
T'aimerais que ce soit vrai (Acoustique)	2020	—N/a	
Les gens sont cool	2020	Drama	
Je suis fan	2021	Drama	
Maman m'a dit	2021	Drama	
Tédio	2021	GRACINHA	Manu Gavassi featuring Alice et Moi
Ça me va	2023	Photographie	
Photographies	2023	Photographie	
J'aime pas sortir	2023	Photographie	
Ça me va - Soft Spleen Version	2023	—N/a	

=== Music videos ===
Title	Year of release	Album/EP	Note
Cent fois	2016	Filme Moi	
Filme Moi	2017	Filme Moi	
C'est toi qu'elle préfère	2017	Filme Moi	
Il y a	2018	Filme Moi	
J'veux sortir avec un rappeur	2018	—N/a	
C'est de la Frénésie	2019	Frénésie	
Je suis all about you	2019	Frénésie	
J'en ai rien à faire	2019	Frénésie	
T'aimerais que ce soit vrai	2020	Drama	
Les gens sont cools	2020	Drama	
Je suis fan	2021	Drama	
Maman m'a dit	2021	Drama	
Le pire de nous deux	2021	Drama	With Dani Terreur
Ça me va	2023	Photographie	
Photographies	2023	Photographie	
