= Pinocchio (virtual singer) =

- Genres: Pop, dance, children's music
- Occupation: singer
- Years active: 2005–2008
- Labels: Lavista / EMI Label One (EMI Music France)

Pinocchio is a fictional, animated French character and singer, created by a music producer and DJ Bruno Berrebi.

He debuted in 2005 with a single titled "T'es pas cap Pinocchio", which reached number 2 in France, and followed with the singles "Pinocchio en hiver (Kalinka)", "Petit Papa Noël", "DJ Pinocchio", etc. during the years 2005–2007.

== Discography ==
=== Albums ===
Year	Title	Charts			
Year	Title	FRA	BEL Wal	SUI	AUT
2005	Mon Alboum!	35	11	—	—
2006	Mein Album!	—	—	27	16
2007	Magic Pinocchio	196	—	—	50

=== Singles ===
Year	Title	Charts				Album
Year	Title	FRA	BEL Wal	SUI	AUT	Album
2005	"T'es pas cap Pinocchio"	2	2	16	—	Mon Alboum!
2005	"Pinocchio en hiver (Kalinka)"	8	12	40	—	Mon Alboum!
2005	"Petit papa Noël" (Pinocchi & Marilou)	7	17	23	—	Mon Alboum!
2006	"Mon cœur fait boom boom" (Marilou)	33	Tip: 5	—	—	Mon Alboum!
2006	"DJ Pinocchio"	36	Tip: 5	—	—	Mon Alboum!
2006	"Klick klack"	—	—	5	4	Mein Album!
2006	"Pinocchio in Moskau (Kalinka)"	—	—	53	25	Mein Album!
2007	"Pinocchio le clown"	20	Tip: 7	—	—	Magic Pinocchio
2007	"L'Oiseau électrique"	38	—	—	—	Magic Pinocchio
2007	"Lasst uns lachen"	—	—	—	53	Magic Pinocchio

== See also ==
- Ilona Mitrecey
- Bébé Lilly
- Titou Le Lapinou
