= The Adventures of Pinocchio (disambiguation) =

The Adventures of Pinocchio is an 1883 novel by Carlo Collodi.

The Adventures of Pinocchio may also refer to:

== Film and TV ==
- The Adventures of Pinocchio (1911 film), an Italian film directed by Giulio Antamoro and starring Ferdinand Guillaume. It was the first movie based on the 1883 novel.
- The Adventures of Pinocchio (unfinished film), an Italian animated feature film intended for release in 1936
- The Adventures of Pinocchio (1972 miniseries), an Italian miniseries
- The Adventures of Pinocchio (1972 film), an animated adaptation from Cartoons Cinematografica Italiana
- Pinocchio: The Series or Saban's Adventures of Pinocchio, a 1972 Japanese TV series
- The Adventures of Buratino (1975 film), a live-action Soviet two-part Children's musical television film with the title often translated as The Adventures of Pinocchio
- Piccolino no Bōken or The Adventures of Pinocchio, a 1976 Japanese/German TV series
- The Adventures of Pinocchio (1996 film) a live-action British adaptation from Steve Barron

== Music ==
- The Adventures of Pinocchio (opera), a 2007 English-language opera by Jonathan Dove
- The Adventures of Pinocchio, a 2009 stage work by Lior Navok

== See also ==
- The New Adventures of Pinocchio (disambiguation)
- Pinocchio (disambiguation)
