= La Vérité (Niagara album) =

Studio album by Niagara
- Released: October 13, 1992
- Recorded: ICP Studios, Brussels
- Genre: Rock
- Length: 44:44
- Label: Polydor, PolyGram
- Producer: Daniel Chenevez

Niagara chronology
Religion (1990)	La Vérité (1992)	Flammes (2002)

Singles from La Vérité
- 1. "La Fin des étoiles" Released: September 1992; 2. "Un million d'années" Released: January 1993; 3. "Le Minotaure" Released: June 1993

La Vérité was the last album by Niagara. Niagara was one of the few French bands who had success and critical acclaim outside France despite not singing in English, because of this they embarked on an international tour in 1991 which included many sold-out concerts. Based on this success, Polydor decided to spare no expense on La Vérité which was recorded with a big band consisting of 45 musicians and had a special jewel case with a relief of the logo of the band on the cover.

The album was dark with an apocalyptic sound, sometimes bordering on hard rock with ballads intermixed and deals with subjects like the state of the planet, the weird role of the media, the problems of being accepted and being a woman. Up to now they were known for an acid rock sound which was reasonably happy. The change of theme resulted in an album which didn't go straight to #1 like their previous two albums,. The album was nevertheless certified Gold. On the personal side, the relationship between Muriel Moreno, the flamboyant singer, and Daniel Chenevez, the guitar and keyboard player, was not as it used to be. Niagara gave a final concert in Le Zénith, Paris on 25 March 1992 before going their separate ways with moderately successful solo careers.
NB. Sound quality: DDD.

== Track listing ==
#	Title	Length
1.	"Je suis de retour" (Muriel Laporte/Daniel Chenevez)	3:48
2.	"C'est maintenant !" (Muriel Laporte/Daniel Chenevez)	4:10
3.	"La Fin des étoiles" (Muriel Laporte/Daniel Chenevez)	3:50
4.	"Le Minotaure" (Daniel Chenevez)	2:53
5.	"Plus belle qu'une femme" (Daniel Chenevez/Muriel Laporte)	3:55
6.	"Un million d'années" (Muriel Laporte/Daniel Chenevez)	4:01
7.	"Le prochain payera pour les autres" (Muriel Laporte/Daniel Chenevez)	3:20
8.	"De la victoire" (Muriel Laporte/Daniel Chenevez)	3:35
9.	"Je n'oublierai jamais" (Muriel Laporte/Daniel Chenevez)	3:35
10.	"Aux cœurs blessés" (Muriel Laporte)	4:11
11.	"Ma dernière pensée" (Muriel Laporte/Daniel Chenevez)	3:20
12.	"Ultravision" (instrumental) (Daniel Chenevez)	1:20
13.	"Les Sapins" (Muriel Laporte/Daniel Chenevez)	2:59

== Album credits ==
=== Personnel ===
- Muriel Moreno - lead vocals, backing vocals, guitar
- Daniel Chenevez - keyboards, Hammond organ, piano, programming
- Andy Newmark - drums
- Evert Verhees - bass guitar
- René Van Barneveld - guitar
- Yarol Poupaud - guitar
- P.P. Arnold - backing vocals
- Juliet Roberts - backing vocals
- Christian Le Chevretel - trumpet
- Patrick Mortier - trumpet
- Michel Marin - saxophone
- Carlo Mertens - trombone
- Wim Poesen - bagpipe
- Jean-Pierre Vanttees - bagpipe
- Patrick Moreau - tuba
- Karel Van Wynandaele - tuba
- Jacques Blanche - French horn
- Michel Leveugle - French horn
- Dirk de Caluwé - flute
- Werner Braïto - harmonica
- Frank Michiels - percussion
- Arnoult Massart - string conducting

String section 1

- Jean-Pierre Catoul - violin
- Éric Gerstmans - violin
- Christian Gerstmans - viola
- Jean-Paul Zanutel - cello
- André Klenes - double bass

String section 2

- Manuel Cormacho - violin
- Shahrzad Djanati - violin
- Christian Gerstmans - violin
- André Klenes - violin
- Hélène Lislu - violin
- Ariane Plumerel - violin
- Georges Siblik - violin
- Ulysse Waterlot - violin
- Patrick Dussart - viola
- Éric Gerstmans - viola
- Sylvia Tolis - viola
- Jean-Paul Dessy - cello
- Fernando Lage - cello
- Sigrid Vandenbogaerde - cello
- Gerry Cambier - double bass
- Alain Denis - double bass

=== Production ===
- Arranged & produced by Daniel Chenevez
- Engineered by Erwin Autrique
- Mixed by Dominique Blanc-Francard at Electric Lady Studios, New York City
- Mastered by Bob Ludwig at Masterdisk, New York City
- Executive producer - Cyril Prieur

=== Design ===
- Jean-Baptiste Mondino - black and white photography
- Eddie Monsoon - colour photography
- Juergen Teller - front cover & back cover photography
- Den Denis - paintbox
- Niagara - cover design
