= Micky Green =

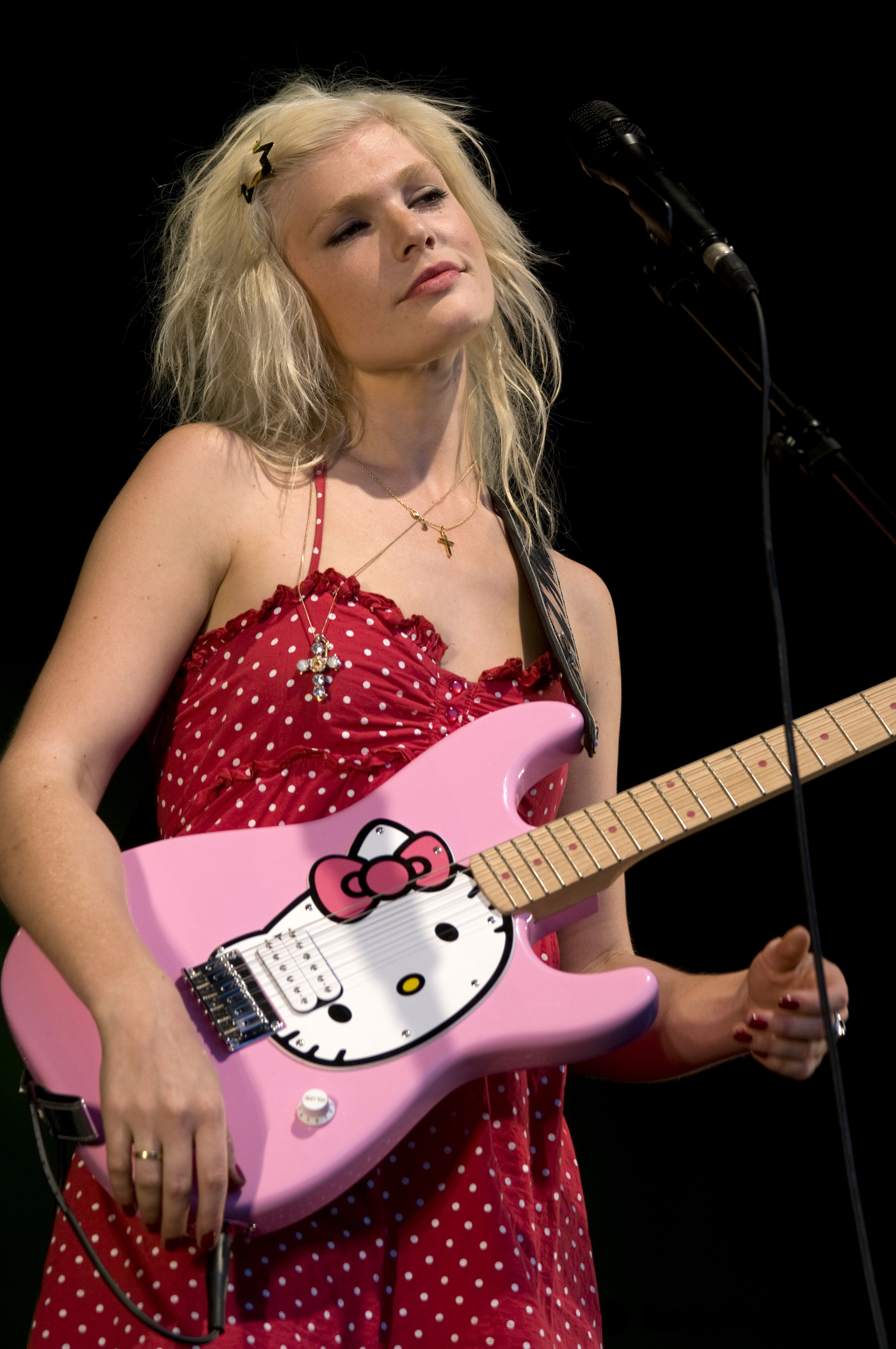
- Micky Green performing at the Aux Zarbs festival, July 2008

Background information
- Born: Michaela Maree Gehrmann; 28 June 1984 (age 42); Sydney, Australia
- Genres: Indie, blues, pop
- Occupations: Singer-songwriter, model
- Instruments: Vocal, guitar, drums
- Years active: 2007–present
- Labels: Polydor, Universal
- Website: mickygreen.com

Michaela Maree Gehrmann (born 28 June 1984), who performs as Micky Green, is an Australian-born blues and pop singer-songwriter. Green left home at the age of 18 years to work in modelling but has mainly concentrated on her music career. At the age of 21 Green relocated to Paris, France. Her debut album White T-Shirt was released there on 27 August 2007, which peaked at No. 12 on the French Albums Chart. Her second album, Honky Tonk, appeared on 18 January 2010, and reached the top 40. Her most popular single, "Oh!", was issued in May 2008 and peaked at No. 12 on the French Singles Chart. As a model Green has worked for Christian Dior and Diesel but by 2010 she had "all but quit modelling".

== Biography ==
Micky Green was born as Michaela Maree Gehrmann on 28 June 1984 and grew up in Sydney. She has both Dutch and German ancestry. Her father, Mark David Gehrmann (born 7 July 1960), an avionics technician/singer, and mother, Alice June Schüssler (born 1 June 1959), a teacher, were married in 1981. Green has an older sister, Anneke Naomi. After her parents separated in 1993, they were raised by their mother. According to Green "I started singing very young with my father who plays the guitar. Then I started playing drums when I was 11, and the piano when I was 14. I started writing around the same time". Green played drums in a jazz and rock band at her secondary school, Asquith Girls High School, and graduated from year 12 in 2001. As a teenager, she was writing songs – one of her first efforts was about a tissue box. She keeps a notebook and has mostly written in airports and hotel rooms. Her first demos were recorded on her computer. To beat out the time, she used the sound of a pen on the table, a box, or her leg.

Green started working as a model and was discovered in a Sydney shopping centre and was signed by Vivien's Model Management. At the age of 21 Green relocated to Paris, France in 2005. She released her first album White T-Shirt on 27 August 2007, working with producer, Renaud Létang (Teki Latex). It peaked at No. 12 on the French Albums Chart. Allmusic's reviewer, Celeste Rhoads, found a "rare gem, drifting playfully along ... There are no songs to skip here; this is perfect soft pop meant to be played through to its flawless end". Upon its Australian release, The Sun-Herald's Craig Mathieson compared her work favourably with Tori Amos ("more focussed") and KT Tunstall ("stripped-down"). Green's most popular single, "Oh!", was issued in May 2008 and reached No. 12 on the French Singles Chart. Mathieson noted "Oh!" has "[s]parse, jazz-inflected beats play-off popping finger clicks and piano parts". It was used in the V Australia series of television advertising, and in an ad for Reese's Peanut Butter Cups in the United States.

As a model Green has worked for Christian Dior and Diesel but by 2010 she had "all but quit modelling". Her second album, Honky Tonk, was issued on 15 February 2010, which reached the top 40 in France. Rhoads was less impressed with this album, "[it] doesn't quite live up to the charm of its predecessor. However, there's a lure to the mellow rhythms that can't be denied". Amazon.com's editorial reviewer found it was "colorful, rhythmic and playful pop ... adorned with more complex arrangements and grooves, with vintage keyboards and a horn section".

Green sang the vocals on a single by Flight Facilities entitled "Stand Still", released November 2013.

Green sang a duo with French singer Julien Doré on his single "Chou Wasabi" in 2014. It peaked at number 31 on the French national music charts.

Green is also the singer/drummer of the all girl soul/rock/reggae/disco/pop trio, SLAP (sending love around the planet), with Charlène Juarez (alias Chat) singer/keys and Sandra Derlon singer/guitarist.

Green owned a pet Labrador named Roxy (now deceased).

== Discography ==
=== Studio albums ===
Title	Album details	Peak chart positions				Certifications
Title	Album details	AUS	BEL (Wa)	FRA	SWI	Certifications
White T-Shirt	Released: 27 August 2007; Label: Polydor; Format: CD, digital download	—	73	12	88	SNEP: Gold
Honky Tonk	Released: 15 February 2010; Label: Polydor; Format: CD, LP, digital download	—	75	35	74	
Daddy, I Don't Want to Get Married	Released: 21 October 2013; Label: Polydor; Format: CD, digital download	—	—	158	—	
"—" denotes a recording that did not chart or was not released in that territory.

=== Singles ===
==== As lead artist ====
Title	Year	Peak chart positions				Certifications	Album
Title	Year	AUS	BEL (Wa)	FRA	SWI	Certifications	Album
"Oh!"	2007	—	— (Note: "Oh!" did not enter the Ultratop 50, but peaked at number 13 on the Walloon Ultratip chart.)	12	69		White T-Shirt
"Shoulda"	2007	—	—	—	—		White T-Shirt
"T.L"	2010	—	—	—	—		Honky Tonk
"In Between (Temporary)"	2013	—	—	—	—		Daddy, I Don't Want to Get Married
"Don't Stop Me Now"	2015	—	—	184	—		
"Do You Copy?"	2021	—	—	—	—		
"Navy Blue"	2023	—	—	—	—		
"—" denotes a recording that did not chart or was not released in that territory.

==== As featured artist ====
Title	Year	Peak chart positions			Certifications	Album
Title	Year	AUS	BEL (Wa)	FRA	Certifications	Album
"Stand Still" (Flight Facilities featuring Micky Green)	2013	61	—	—		Down to Earth
"Chou wasabi" (Julien Doré featuring Micky Green)	2014	—	12	15		Løve
"—" denotes a recording that did not chart or was not released in that territory.
