= Magic Pinocchio =

Studio album by Pinocchio
- Released: March 9, 2007
- Genre: Pop, children's music
- Language: French
- Label: Lavista / EMI Label One (EMI Music France)
- Producer: Bruno Berrebi

Pinocchio chronology
Mon Alboum! (2005)	Magic Pinocchio (2007)

Magic Pinocchio is the second album by French virtual singer Pinocchio, released by EMI Music France on March 9, 2007.

The album debuted at number 196 in France, briefly re-entering at number 122 four months later.

== Track listing ==
Enhanced CD (Lavista 3889650)
No.	Title	Length
1.	"Pinocchio le clown"	2:38
2.	"Mon orchestration"	3:40
3.	"Pinocchio l'agent secret"	2:27
4.	"L'Oiseau électrique"	3:19
5.	"Comme une rock star"	3:05
6.	"Pinocchio le policier (Stop)"	2:52
7.	"Pin pon (Le bal des pompiers)"	2:33
8.	"P'tit Cowboy (La danse du cowboy)"	2:54
9.	"Circus Melody"	2:56
10.	"Bonne nuit Pinocchio"	2:50

== Charts ==
Chart (2007)	Peak position
Austrian Albums (Ö3 Austria)	50
French Albums (SNEP)	122
