= Les Bêtises =

1986 single by Sabine Paturel

Single by Sabine Paturel

from the album Cœur Bébé
- B-side: "J'crois que j't'aime"
- Released: March 1986
- Recorded: 1985, France
- Genre: Pop
- Length: 3:00
- Label: Careere
- Songwriter(s): Sylvain Lebel; Dominique Pankratoff
- Producer(s): Bernard Ricci

Sabine Paturel singles chronology
"Les Bêtises" (1986)	"P'tit Bouchon" (1986)

"Les Bêtises" (French translation for "Stupid Things") is a 1985 song recorded by French artist Sabine Paturel. Released in March 1986 as her debut single from her album Cœur Bébé, released two years later, on which it is the sixth track. The song was a smash hit in France, though it failed to top the chart. It was covered by several artists throughout the years and became a popular song.

== Lyrics and music ==
Written and composed by Sylvain Lebel and Dominique Pankratoff, "Les Bêtises" is a song recorded as a nursery rhyme. Elia Habib, an expert of French charts, stated it is full of mischievousness and could be subtitled "the rhyme of a calamity" as, in the lyrics, "the performer tells the disasters which she carried out to punish her boyfriend for having left her". Paturel performs the song with a childlike voice.

== Chart performance ==
In France, "Les Bêtises" debuted at number 50 on the chart edition of 22 March 1986, entered the top ten in its sixth week where it remained for 19 weeks, with a peak at number two for five consecutive weeks, but was unable to dislodge Princess Stéphanie of Monaco's hit "Ouragan" which topped the chart then; it fell off the top 50 after 30 weeks of presence. On the 1986 year-end chart, the song ranked number three, behind "Les Démons de minuit" and "Ouragan".

== Track listings ==
- 7" single
- "Les Bêtises" — 3:00
- "J'crois que j't'aime" — 3:15

== Charts ==
=== Weekly charts ===
Weekly chart performance for "Les Bêtises"
Chart (1986)	Peak position
Europe (European Hot 100)	21
France (SNEP)	2

=== Year-end charts ===
Year-end chart performance for "Les Bêtises"
Chart (1986)	Position
Europe (European Hot 100)	37
France (SNEP)	3

== Certifications ==
Certifications for "Les Bêtises"
Region	Certification	Certified units/sales
France (SNEP)	Silver	125,000^{*}
^{*} Sales figures based on certification alone.

== Cover versions ==
"Les Bêtises"

Single by Bébé Lilly

from the album Mon Monde à moi
- B-side: "Le Coupe du monde"
- Released: June 2006
- Recorded: 2006, France
- Genre: Pop
- Length: 3:02
- Label: Heben Music
- Songwriter(s): Sylvain Lebel; Dominique Pankratoff
- Producer(s): Teetoff

Bébé Lilly singles chronology
"Allô Papy" (2006)	"Les Bêtises" (2006)	"La Jungle des animaux" (2006)

"Les Bêtises" was covered in 2006 by Bébé Lilly. Produced by Teetoff, the song was the second single from the album Mon monde à moi and was released on 2 June 2006. It achieved success in France where it reached number eight and remained in the top 100 for twenty weeks. It also charted for two weeks in Switzerland and peaked at number 90. "Les Bêtises" was also covered by Leslie on her cover album 80 Souvenirs. In 2010, Les Enfoirés recorded a cover of the song for their album La Crise de nerfs!; the singers on this version are Jean-Louis Aubert, Zazie, Jean-Jacques Goldman, Jean-Baptiste Maunier and Jenifer Bartoli.
