= DJ Pinocchio =

Single by Pinocchio

from the album Mon Alboum!
- Released: June 2006
- Genre: Pop
- Label: Lavista / EMI Label One (EMI Music France)
- Songwriter(s): Bruno Berrebi
- Producer(s): Bruno Berrebi

Pinocchio singles chronology
"Mon cœur fait boom boom" (2006)	"DJ Pinocchio" (2006)	"Pinocchio le clown" (2007)

Music video
- "DJ Pinocchio" on YouTube

"DJ Pinocchio" is a song by French virtual singer Pinocchio from his debut album Mon Alboum! (2005). Released as the fifth and last single from that album in June 2006, the song reached number 36 in France.

== Track listing ==
CD single (Lavista 0946 3 67732 0 9 / EMI Label One, France)
No.	Title	Length
1.	"DJ Pinocchio" (Radio Edit)	3:24
2.	"DJ Pinocchio" (Instrumental)	3:24
3.	"DJ Pinocchio" (Video Clip)	3:24

== Charts ==
Chart (2006)	Peak position
Belgium (Ultratip Bubbling Under Wallonia)	5
France (SNEP)	36
