= Pinocchio le clown =

Single by Pinocchio

from the album Magic Pinocchio
- Released: March 2, 2007
- Genre: Pop
- Length: 2:36
- Label: Lavista 09463 3888972 4 / EMI Label One (EMI Music France)
- Songwriter(s): Bruno Berrebi
- Producer(s): Bruno Berrebi

Pinocchio singles chronology
"DJ Pinocchio" (2006)	"Pinocchio le clown" (2007)	"L'Oiseau électrique" (2007)

Music video
- "Pinocchio le clown" on YouTube

"Pinocchio le clown" is a song by French virtual singer Pinocchio from his second album Magic Pinocchio. It was the album's opening track and it was released as its first single. The single came out on March 2, 2007, one week before the album, and debuted at number 20 in France.

== Track listing ==
CD maxi single Lavista 09463 3888972 4
No.	Title	Length
1.	"Pinocchio le clown"	2:36
2.	"Pinocchio le clown" (Version instrumentale)	2:36
3.	"Pinocchio le clown" (Clip compatible Mac & Pc)	2:36

== Charts ==
Chart (2007)	Peak position
Belgium (Ultratip Bubbling Under Wallonia)	7
France (SNEP)	20
