= Quel enfer! =

Studio album by Niagara
- Released: April 18, 1988
- Length: 44:07
- Label: Polydor/PolyGram
- Producer: Daniel Chenevez

Niagara chronology
Encore un dernier baiser (1986)	Quel enfer! (1988)	Religion (1990)

Singles from Quel enfer!
- 1. "Assez!" Released: 1988; 2. "Soleil d'hiver" Released: 1988; 3. "Flammes de l'enfer" Released: 1989; 4. "Baby Louis" Released: 1989

Quel enfer! (French, 'What Hell!') is the second studio album by the French pop rock duo Niagara. It came out in 1988 on Polydor.

Like all four of the band's studio albums, Quel enfer! was certified Gold in France.

== Critical reception ==
In 2010, the French edition of the Rolling Stone magazine put the album at no. 99 in its top 100 list of French rock albums.

== Track listing ==
No.	Title	Writer(s)	Length
1.	"J'ai tout essayé"	Daniel Chenevez	4:26
2.	"Assez!"	Daniel Chenevez	3:44
3.	"Flammes de l'enfer"	Daniel Chenevez, Muriel Laporte	4:08
4.	"La fille des collines"	Daniel Chenevez, Muriel Laporte	3:32
5.	"Au royaume des sourds, les borgnes sont rois"	Daniel Chenevez	3:18
6.	"Baby Louis"	Daniel Chenevez, Muriel Laporte	3:56
7.	"T.V. Addict"	Daniel Chenevez	4:04
8.	"Soleil d'hiver"	Daniel Chenevez	4:10
9.	"Sois beau et tais-toi"	Daniel Chenevez, Muriel Laporte	2:46
10.	"Western"	Daniel Chenevez	4:06
11.	"Flammes de l'enfer (remix)" (CD bonus title)	Daniel Chenevez, Muriel Laporte	5:53
