= Tchiki boum =

Single by Niagara

from the album Encore un dernier baiser
- Language: French
- Released: 1986
- Genre: Pop
- Length: 3:30
- Label: Polydor
- Songwriter(s): Muriel Laporte
- Producer(s): Daniel Chenevez, Daniel Paboeuf

Niagara singles chronology
"Tchiki boum" (1986)	"L'Amour à la plage" (1986)

Music video
- "Tchiki boum" on YouTube

"Tchiki boum" is a song by French band Niagara. Originally issued as their debut single in January 1986, it was included on their debut album Encore un dernier baiser (released in 1986). Written by Muriel Laporte who also performs the vocals, the song met with success, reaching number 13 on the French singles chart. It was the only single released by Niagara as a trio, as guitarist José Tamarin left after its release and the band has remained a duo from then on.

== Critical reception ==
A review in Pan-European magazine Music & Media described "Tchiki Boum" "an infectious cocktail mix of Afro and Cuban rhythms, much in the Miami Sound Machine (Conga) vein". According to French charts expert Elia Habib, the song displays "a retro and light style" and, like Niagara's other songs at the time, refers to the classic American filmography of the 50s.

== Chart performance ==
In France, "Tchiki boum" debuted at number 42 on 1 February 1986, reached a peak of number 13 twice, in its sixth and ninth weeks, and spent ten weeks in the top 20 and a total of 20 weeks in the top 50, which remained the second longest chart run for a Niagara's single. It also received a silver disc awarded by the Syndicat National de l'Édition Phonographique. On the overall Eurochart Hot 100, it started at number 93 on 22 February 1986 and peaked at number 55 after nine weeks on the chart. Not much aired on radios, it appeared for a sole week on the European Airplay Top 50, at number 45.

== Track listings ==
- 7" single Polydor 883 329-7 (1985)
1. "Tchiki boum" (3:30)
2. "Torpedo" (3:20)

== Charts ==
Chart (1986)	Peak position
Europe (European Hot 100)	55
Europe (European Airplay Top 50)	45
France (SNEP)	13

== Certifications ==
Region	Certification	Certified units/sales
France (SNEP)	Silver	250,000^{*}
^{*} Sales figures based on certification alone.
