= Religion (Niagara album) =

Studio album by Niagara
- Released: 1990
- Studio: ICP (Brussels, Belgium); Studio Plus XXX (Paris, France)
- Length: 41:12
- Label: Polydor
- Producer: Daniel Chenevez

Niagara chronology
Quel enfer! (1988)	Religion (1990)	La Vérité (1992)

Singles from Religion
- 1. "J'ai vu" Released: 1990; 2. "Pendant que les champs brûlent" Released: 1990; 3. "Psychotrope" Released: 1991; 4. "La vie est peut-être belle" Released: 1991

Religion is the third studio album by French pop rock duo Niagara. It was released in 1990 by Polydor Records. The album was certified double gold by the Syndicat National de l'Édition Phonographique (SNEP).

According to Pascale Hamon of Radio France Internationale, on this album the duo sounds "much more muscular" than at the beginning of their career. ("Over the course of their career. their music will evolve (make a transition) from rock to a much more muscular version on their third album Religion.")

== Track listing ==
All tracks are written by Muriel Laporte and Daniel Chenevez

No.	Title	Length
1.	"Le ciel s'est déchiré"	4:11
2.	"J'ai vu"	3:52
3.	"Chemin de croix"	4:35
4.	"Pendant que les champs brûlent"	4:01
5.	"Au-delà de la rivière"	3:25
6.	"Chien rouge"	3:52
7.	"Psychotrope"	3:20
8.	"La vie est peut-être belle"	3:26
9.	"L'Âme des vandales"	3:55
10.	"Pardon à mes ennemis"	3:34
11.	"Ma vie est un serpent au cœur froid" (CD bonus track)	3:00

== Charts ==
Chart (1990)	Peak position
French Albums (SNEP)	17

== Certifications ==
Region	Certification	Certified units/sales
France (SNEP)	2× Gold	200,000^{*}
^{*} Sales figures based on certification alone.
