= L'Oiseau électrique =

Single by Pinocchio

from the album Magic Pinocchio
- Released: August 2007
- Genre: Pop
- Label: Lavista / EMI Label One (EMI Music France)
- Songwriter(s): Bruno Berrebi
- Producer(s): Bruno Berrebi

Pinocchio singles chronology
"Pinocchio le clown" (2007)	"L'Oiseau électrique" (2007)

Music video
- "L'Oiseau électrique" on YouTube

"L'Oiseau électrique" is a song by French virtual singer Pinocchio from his second album Magic Pinocchio. It was the album's fourth track and it was released as its second and last single. The single came out in August 2007, five months and a half after the album, and debuted at number 38 in France.

== Track listing ==
CD maxi single Lavista 509995021060
No.	Title	Length
1.	"L'oiseau Electrique"	3:19
2.	"L'oiseau Electrique"	3:19
3.	"L'oiseau Electrique" (Version A Cappella)	2:55
4.	"L'oiseau Electrique" (Clip compatible Mac & Pc)	3:19

== Charts ==
Chart (2007)	Peak position
France (SNEP)	38
