= Sabine Paturel =

French singer and actress (born 1955)

- Born: Sabine Paturel; 19 September 1955 (age 71); Toulon, France
- Genre: Pop music
- Occupations: Singer, actress
- Years active: 1986–present
- Website: Official website

Sabine Paturel (born 19 September 1955) is a French singer and actress.

== Biography ==
Paturel was born in Toulon, and has three sisters.

In 1986, her first single "Les Bêtises" (French, "stupid things") stayed for 30 weeks in the French singles chart (Top 50) from March to October 1986, peaking at #2 for several weeks and achieving Gold status. In 1987, she released her second single, "P'tit Bouchon", which reached #13.

At the same time, she took lessons in comedy with Jean-Laurent Cochet, which allowed her to start an acting career in theater. She triumphed in La Menteuse at the Théâtre Marigny and was nominated at the Molière Award. She played in various musicals, notably La Mégère apprivoisée and La Reine Margot.

As an actress, she appeared in television series such as Cordier, juge et flic and L'Instit and in films such as Prends ton passe-montagne, on va à la plage (1983) and En cas de guerre mondiale, je file à l'étranger (also in 1983).

Paturel has now created her own drama courses and supplies coaching and vocational training.

She is not related to the French actor Dominique Paturel.

== Discography ==
=== Singles ===
- 1986 : "Les Bêtises"
  - "Les Bêtises" (3:00)
  - "J'crois que j't'aime" (3:15)
- 1987 : "P'tit bouchon"
  - "P'tit bouchon" (3:25)
  - "Dans ma vie, dans ma tête" (2:57)
- 1987 : "Maladie d'été"
  - "Maladie d'été" (3:56)
  - "Jardin secret" (2:12)
- 1987 : "Je craque"
  - "Je craque" (3:45)
  - "Le Cœur en sorbet" (2:37)
- 1987 : "Les Enquêtes caméléon", television series (sung by Sabine Paturel)
  - "Papa file, Maman court" (3:06)
  - "Les Enquêtes caméléon" instrumental (2:30)
- 1988 : "Caramel mou, Caramel dur"
  - "Caramel mou, Caramel dur" (3:37)
  - "Emmerdeuse" (3:03)
- 1988 : "Caramel mou, caramel dur" (12")
  - "Caramel mou, Caramel dur" (5:10)
  - "Caramel mou, Caramel dur" (3:37)
  - "Emmerdeuse" (3:03)
- 1990 : "Insatiable et rebelle"
  - "Insatiable et rebelle" (3:14)
  - "Ami Ami" (3:10)
- 1990 : "Traces de stress"
  - "Traces de stress" (3:56)
  - "S.V.P. Dessine moi un amour" (2:28)

=== Albums ===
==== Cœur bébé ====
Released in 1988 as CD and 12".

1. "Cœur bébé (3:57)
2. "Elton John en tête à tête" (2:43)
3. "Dans les oubliettes" (3:21)
4. "Emmerdeuse" (3:03)
5. "Le cœur en sorbet" (2:37)
6. "Les bêtises" (3:00)
7. "Maladie d'été" (3:56)
8. "Ma 2CV" (3:11)
9. "Je craque" (3:45)
10. "Insolente" (3:36)
11. "Jardin secret" (2:12)
12. "P'tit bouchon" (3:25)

==== Best of ====
Released on 1 October 2002 under the label Choice of Music

1. "J'ai dix ans" (3:03, new song, cover of Alain Souchon's song)
2. "Les Bêtises" (3:05)
3. "P'tit bouchon" (3:21)
4. "Traces de stress" (3:24)
5. "Je craque" (3:45)
6. "L'amour à la plage" (3:11, previously unreleased)
7. "Maladie d'été" (3:55)
8. "Insatiable et rebelle" (3:15)
9. "Porque te vas" (3:16, new song, cover of Jeanette's song)
10. "Cœur bébé" (3:57)
11. "Dieu que l'amour est triste" (3:17, new song)
12. "Caramel mou, Caramel dur" (5:03)
13. "Ami, ami" (3:11)
14. "Dans ma vie, dans ma tête" (2:54)
15. "Jardin secret" (2:10)
16. "Le cœur en sorbet" (2:38)
17. "Dans les oubliettes" (3:23)
18. "Emmerdeuse" (3:05)
19. "Dessine moi un amour" (2:27, new song)
20. "Papa file, maman court" (3:06)

==== Atmosphères ====
Selfreleased digipack – 4 February 2014.

1. "Atmosphères (3:13)
2. "Insatiable et Rebelle (3:07)
3. "J'étais venue pour dire bonjour (2:47)
4. "Dis qu'on est dingue (2:58)
5. "Bamako (4:28)
6. "Tout explose (3:51)
7. "Dieu que l'amour est triste (3:17)
8. "Les Dames de la cour (1:51)
9. "Rien ne va plus (2:35)
10. "Traces de stress (3:24)
11. "A ceux de là-bas (3:27)
12. "Les Bêtises (remix) (3:07)

=== Others ===
- "Fais comme l'oiseau" (3:07)
