= Titou Le Lapinou =

- Genres: Pop, children's music
- Occupation: singer
- Instrument: vocals
- Years active: 2006–2008
- Labels: My Label (2006–2007), WEA (2008)

Titou Le Lapinou (or Titou for short) is a fictional French singer, a little young rabbit. His target audience are young children aged around 1–6.

He is most known for his two first singles, "Le Titou" and "Le Coucou De Titou", that reached number 4 and number 6 in France, respectively. He also released two albums, Mon Premier Album in 2006 and Le Monde De Titou in 2008.

== Discography ==
=== Albums ===
Year	Title	Charts		Sales
Year	Title	FRA	BEL Wal	Sales
2006	Mon Premier Album	33	42	82,000
2008	Le Monde De Titou	96	61	19,000

=== Singles ===
Year	Title	Charts			Album
Year	Title	FRA	BEL Wal	SUI	Album
2006	"Le Titou"	4	33	77	Mon Premier Album
2006	"Le Coucou De Titou"	6	7	—	Mon Premier Album
2007	"Les Gros Mots Des Tout-Petits"	11	22	—	Mon Premier Album
2008	"La Danse De Titou"	17	—	—	Le Monde De Titou
2008	"1, 2, 3 Soleil"	(TL=104)	—	—	Le Monde De Titou

== See also ==
- Bébé Lilly
- Pinocchio (singer)
- Ilona Mitrecey
- Holly Dolly
- Gummibär
