= Tu Tatuta Tuta Ta =

Single by Pin-Occhio

from the album Pinocchio Vai!!
- B-side: "Remix"
- Released: 1993
- Recorded: 1993
- Genre: Electronic, eurodance
- Length: 4:08
- Label: Blow Up (Germany); Flarenasch (France) la-Pin-Production (Italy); Basic Mix (Spain); Power Dance (Belgium); Dino Music (Netherlands)
- Songwriter(s): Pascal Languirand, Nicola Savino, Marco Biondi
- Producer(s): M. Biondi, M. Castelli, N. Savino

Pin-Occhio singles chronology
"Pinocchio" (1993)	"Tu Tatuta Tuta Ta" (1993)	"Vai!!" (1993)

"Tu Tatuta Tuta Ta" is a 1993 electronic song recorded by Italian music group Pin-Occhio. It was the second single from its debut album Pinocchio Vai!! and was released in June 1993, following the success of its previous hit single, "Pin-Occhio".

The song used a slightly modified riff from the 1983 song "Living on Video" recorded by Canadian band Trans-X, which was itself sampled in 2006 by Pakito. The lyrics are only composed of the title which is repeated in the refrains by a male voice.

== Chart performance ==
"Tu Tatuta Tuta Ta" achieved some success throughout Europe, including France, Switzerland and the Netherlands where it reached the top 20, but it was a hit in Belgium (Wallonia) where it topped the chart for three weeks and remained in the top ten for nine weeks. In Belgium (Flanders), it peaked at number four and charted for 14 weeks. On the European Hot 100 Singles, it started at number 39 on 17 July 1993, peaked at number 26 three weeks later, and fell off the chart after 16 weeks of presence. However, the song was not successful in Germany where it failed the chart. Several additional remixes were produced for a release in Italy.

== Track listings ==
These are the formats and track listings of major single releases of "Tu Tatuta Tuta Ta":

CD single / 7" single - France, Belgium, Netherlands
12" maxi - Spain, Italy

No.	Title	Length
1.	"Tu Tatuta Tuta Ta" (tuta mix)	4:09
2.	"Tu Tatuta Tuta Ta" (sensa voce mix)	4:23

CD maxi - France

No.	Title	Length
1.	"Tu Tatuta Tuta Ta" (tuta mix)	3:45
2.	"Tu Tatuta Tuta Ta" (sensa voce mix)	4:23
3.	"Tu Tatuta Tuta Ta" (mangiafuoco mix)	4:10
4.	"Tu Tatuta Tuta Ta" (sweet ballerina)	5:05

CD maxi / 12" maxi - Germany, Italy

No.	Title	Length
1.	"Tu Tatuta Tuta Ta" (tu ta tu version)	4:08
2.	"Tu Tatuta Tuta Ta" (sensa voce mix)	4:25
3.	"Tu Tatuta Tuta Ta" (mangiafuoco mix)	4:11

12" maxi - Remixes - Italy

No.	Title	Length
1.	"Tu Tatuta Tuta Ta" (ho sete mix)	4:30
2.	"Tu Tatuta Tuta Ta" (ho bevuto mix)	4:20
3.	"Tu Tatuta Tuta Ta" (ubri mix)	2:05

== Credits ==
- Lyrics and music : Marco Biondi and Nicola Savino
- Recorded at Village Studio-Sound
- Engineer : Miki Chieregato
- Executive licensee : Power Dance Dept of Sarema International
- Management : AES France
- Producer : Nicola Savino
- Cover design : Ephemere
- Distribution : Musidisc (France) / Distrisound (Belgium)

== Charts ==
Chart (1993)	Peak position
Belgium (Ultratop 50 Flanders)	4
Belgium (Ultratop 50 Wallonia)	1
Europe (European Hot 100)	26
France (SNEP)	14
Netherlands (Single Top 100)	16
Switzerland (Schweizer Hitparade)	20
