= Encore un dernier baiser =

Studio album by Niagara
- Released: November 22, 1986
- Recorded: 1985–1986
- Label: Polydor/PolyGram
- Producer: Daniel Chenevez, Daniel Pabœuf

Niagara chronology
Encore un dernier baiser (1986)	Quel enfer ! (1988)

Singles from Encore un dernier baiser
- 1. "Tchiki boum" Released: 1985; 2. "L'Amour à la plage" Released: 1986; 3. "Je dois m'en aller" Released: 1986; 4. "Quand la ville dort" Released: 1987

Encore un dernier baiser is the debut studio album by the French pop rock band Niagara. It came out in 1986 on Polydor.

By the time the album came out, the trio Niagara became a duo, as guitarist José Tamarin left before its release. (more precisely, after the release of the band's first single "Tchiki boum").

The album, which, in the words of the book 30 Years of French Rock, "hit the racks with its psychedelic silk sleeve", "turned into a jackpot win".

Like all four of the studio albums the band would release, Encore un dernier baiser was certified Gold in France.

== Track listing ==
No.	Title	Writer(s)	Producer(s)	Length
1.	"Tu sais bien ce dont j'ai envie"	Daniel Chenevez	Daniel Chenevez	3:35
2.	"Encore un dernier baiser"	Daniel Chenevez	Daniel Chenevez	4:09
3.	"Je dois m'en aller"	Daniel Chenevez	Daniel Chenevez	3:25
4.	"Interdit aux moins de seize ans"	Daniel Chenevez	Daniel Chenevez	3:19
5.	"Tchiki boum"	Muriel Laporte	Daniel Chenevez, Daniel Pabœuf	3:33
6.	"Dans la peau"	Daniel Chenevez	Daniel Chenevez	4:08
7.	"Acide Winy"	Daniel Chenevez	Daniel Chenevez	3:15
8.	"Quand la ville dort"	Daniel Chenevez, Muriel Laporte	Daniel Chenevez	3:48
9.	"Torpédo"	Muriel Laporte	Daniel Chenevez, Daniel Pabœuf	3:19
10.	"L'Amour à la plage"	Muriel Laporte	Daniel Chenevez, Daniel Pabœuf	3:29
11.	"Les amants" (CD and cassette bonus title)	Muriel Laporte	Daniel Chenevez, Daniel Pabœuf	2:38
