= The New Adventures of Pinocchio =

The New Adventures of Pinocchio may refer to:

- The New Adventures of Pinocchio (TV series), American show syndicated starting 1960–61, directed by Arthur Rankin Jr.
- The New Adventures of Pinocchio (film), 1999 film directed by Michael Anderson

== See also ==
- The Adventures of Pinocchio (disambiguation)
- Pinocchio (disambiguation)
