= Vous & moi =

Studio album by Julien Doré
- Released: 2 March 2018
- Label: Columbia, Sony BMG

Julien Doré chronology
& (2016)	Vous & moi (2018)

Vous & moi is an acoustic album by French singer Julien Doré, released on 2 March 2018. It mostly consists of acoustic versions of songs from his fourth studio album &. The album peaked at number two in France and Wallonia.

== Track listing ==
No.	Title	Length
1.	"Le lac (Acoustic)"	4:20
2.	"Coco Câline (Acoustic)"	3:46
3.	"Porto-Vecchio (Acoustic)"	4:45
4.	"Moonlight Serenade (Acoustic)"	4:12
5.	"Africa (Acoustic)" (with Dick Rivers)	3:34
6.	"Eden (Acoustic)"	4:11
7.	"Sublime & silence (Acoustic)"	5:14
8.	"Romy (Acoustic)"	4:20
9.	"Caresse (Acoustic)"	4:16
10.	"Magnolia (Acoustic)"	4:39
11.	"De mes sombres archives (Acoustic)"	8:36
12.	"Aline (Acoustic)"	3:44

== Charts ==
Chart (2018)	Peak position
Belgian Albums (Ultratop Wallonia)	2
French Albums (SNEP)	5
Swiss Albums (Schweizer Hitparade)	10

== Certifications ==
Region	Certification	Certified units/sales
France (SNEP)	Gold	50,000^{‡}
^{‡} Sales+streaming figures based on certification alone.

== Release history ==
Region	Date	Format	Label
France	2 March 2018	CD, digital download	Columbia/Sony BMG
