= Bébé Lilly =

Animated baby singer

- Also known as: Baby Lilly, Lilly Baba
- Origin: France
- Genres: Dance, electronic
- Years active: 2006–2012

Bébé Lilly (also known as Lilly Baba or Baby Lilly) is an animated baby girl singer from France, created by Akad Daroul. She has released thirteen singles, mainly in French, but several have also been recorded in other languages. She also has four albums and a DVD. Many of her songs have been ranked on top ten hits lists in Lebanon.

== Background ==
Akad Daroul came up with an idea for a children's song in a honeymoon he had in the mid-2000s. Upon returning home, he started writing Allô papy, about a baby who called his grandfather on the phone to ask him life questions. His nieces Lilia (inspiration behind the name Lilly) and Sarah were brought into the studio, while Akad's wife made the backing vocals. Sarah was the voice of Bébé Lilly. The music videos and songs were adapted into several languages and became hits in several countries outside France, such as Germany, Estonia, Spain, Italy, Lebanon, North Africa, and even Brazil, amassing two billion views.

After a twelve-year hiatus, Daroul announced in the summer of 2024 that the character would return at an unspecified date in late 2024, with new songs and two covers. The hiatus and the delays were due to legal problems with all of the visuals, which have been used without authorization.

== Discography ==
=== Albums ===
Year	Title	Chart			Certification (FR)
Year	Title	FR	AUT	POR	Certification (FR)
2006	Mon Monde à moi ^{1}	32	12	2	—
2007	Les Vacances de Bébé Lilly	57	—	—	—
2007	Mon Tour du monde à moi	59	—	—	—
2008	Les Aventures de Bébé Lilly ^{2}	34	—	14	—
2008	Mon Monde à moi (2 CD)	195	—	—	—

^{1} Also released under the titles Este e o meu mundo (Portugal), Il mio mondo (Italy) and Meine Welt (Austria)
^{2} Also released under the titles Super Bébé (Portugal), A világ körü and Dookoła świata

=== Singles ===
Year	Title	Chart						Certification (FR)
Year	Title	FR	SWI	GER	POR	IT	AUT	Certification (FR)
2006	"Allô Papy" ^{1}	5	—	34	—	17	8	Silver
2006	"Les Bêtises"	8	90	—	3	—	—	—
2006	"La Jungle des animaux" ^{2}	4	—	—	35	4	—	Silver
2006	"Petit Papa Noël"	5	41	—	—	—	—	—
2007	"Les Cow-Boys"	6	80	—	—	—	—	—
2007	"Mon Megamix à moi"	5	—	—	—	—	—	—
2007	"Les Pirates"	10	—	—	—	—	—	—
2007	"1000 et une nuits"	12	—	—	—	—	—	—
2008	"Dans l'espace"	7	—	—	—	—	—	—
2008	"La Changa"	8	—	—	—	—	—	—
2008	"Viens avec moi"	15	—	—	—	—	—	—
2008	"Le super mégamix"	8	—	—	—	—	—	—
2009	"Même pas peur"	10	—	—	—	—	—	—
2009	"Les jeux vidéos"	19	—	—	—	—	—	—
2009	"Les fantômes"	20	—	—	—	—	—	—
2009	"Petit Papa Noël (2009)"	9	—	—	—	—	—	—
2009	"Le mégamix 2010"	13	—	—	—	—	—	—

^{1} Also released under the titles "Hallo Papi" (Portugal) and "Ciao Papi" (Italy)
^{2} Also released under the title "La giungla degli animali" (Italy)

=== DVD ===
Year	Title	Chart		Certification (FR)
Year	Title	FR	POR	Certification (FR)
2006	Mon Monde à moi ^{1}	?	1	—
2007	Les Aventures de Bébé Lilly ^{2}	?	1	—

^{1} Also released under the title O meu (Portugal)
^{2} Also released under the title O meu das ferias (Portugal)

- Karaoke Z Bébé Lilly was certified Gold and peaked at #21 in Poland.

== See also ==
- Titou Le Lapinou
- Pinocchio (singer)
- Ilona Mitrecey
