= Bichon (album) =

Studio album by Julien Doré
- Released: 21 March 2011
- Genre: Pop
- Label: Columbia, Sony BMG

Julien Doré chronology
Ersatz (2008)	Bichon (2011)	Løve (2013)

Bichon is the second album of Julien Doré, released by Columbia/Sony BMG on 21 March 2011. The release consists of a single 13-track CD and is the follow-up of his debut album Ersatz. .

== Track list ==
1. "Baie des anges" (4:56)
2. "Kiss Me Forever" (3:01)
3. "BB Baleine" (duet with Françoise Hardy) (3:41)
4. "L'Été Summer" (2:44)
5. "Golf Bonjovi" (3:27)
6. "Laisse avril" (3:47)
7. "Roubaix mon amour" (2:58)
8. "Glenn Close" (7:24)
9. "Vitriol" (4:22)
10. "Miami" (2:39)
11. "Bleu Canard" (1:24)
12. "Homosexuel" (duet with Yvette Horner) (2:48)
13. "Bergman" (duet with Biyouna) (3:39)

Special edition There was also a 2 CD limited edition of Bichon that contained the track list of an English language EP in collaboration with The Bash and two additional bonus tracks as follows:

CD 1: The exact content of above track list

CD 2:

=== Julien Doré & The Bash EP ===
(All 5 tracks in English language and credited to Julien Doré & The Bash)

1. "Winnipeg" (5:06)
2. "The Wall (3:20)
3. "Just A Deal" (2:41)
4. "Wheelchair" (2:21)
5. "Brown Ears" (7:11)

=== Bonus tracks ===
1. "L'été summer" (Demo version) (3:12)
2. "Wrong" (duet with Biyouna) (4:24)

== Charts ==
Chart (2013)	Peak position
Belgian Albums (Ultratop Wallonia)	4
French Albums (SNEP)	3
Swiss Albums (Schweizer Hitparade)	20
