= & (album) =

Studio album by Julien Doré
- Released: 14 October 2016
- Length: 51:26
- Label: Columbia, Sony BMG

Julien Doré chronology
Løve Live (2015)	& (2016)	Vous & moi (2018)

& is the fourth studio album by French singer Julien Doré, released on 14 October 2016. The album debuted at number one in France and Wallonia. "Le lac", released as the first single from the album, also reached number one on the French singles chart.

== Track listing ==
No.	Title	Length
1.	"Porto-Vecchio"	3:43
2.	"Coco Câline"	3:47
3.	"Sublime & Silence"	3:56
4.	"Le Lac"	3:55
5.	"Corail" (featuring Juliette Armanet)	3:31
6.	"Mon écho"	4:34
7.	"Romy"	3:38
8.	"Moonlight Serenade"	3:16
9.	"Eden"	3:48
10.	"Magnolia"	3:43
11.	"Beyrouth plage"	2:59
12.	"Caresse"	3:48
13.	"De mes sombres archives"	6:50

== Charts ==
=== Weekly charts ===
Chart (2016)	Peak position
Belgian Albums (Ultratop Flanders)	80
Belgian Albums (Ultratop Wallonia)	1
French Albums (SNEP)	1
Swiss Albums (Schweizer Hitparade)	3

=== Year-end charts ===
Chart (2016)	Position
Belgian Albums (Ultratop Wallonia)	16
French Albums (SNEP)	15
Swiss Albums (Schweizer Hitparade)	72
Chart (2017)	Position
Belgian Albums (Ultratop Wallonia)	6
French Albums (SNEP)	15
Swiss Albums (Schweizer Hitparade)	95
Chart (2018)	Position
Belgian Albums (Ultratop Wallonia)	44

== Certifications ==
Region	Certification	Certified units/sales
Belgium (BRMA)	Gold	15,000^{*}
France (SNEP)	Diamond	500,000^{‡}
Switzerland (IFPI Switzerland)	Gold	10,000^{‡}
^{*} Sales figures based on certification alone.^{‡} Sales+streaming figures based on certification alone.

== Release history ==
Region	Date	Format	Label
France	14 October 2016	CD, digital download	Columbia/Sony BMG

== See also ==
- List of number-one hits of 2016 (France)
