= Pin-Occhio =

Italian electronic band

Pin-Occhio is an Italian electronic band composed of deejays Nicola Savino and Marco Biondi. It had its peak of popularity in 1993 with two hit singles in Europe.

== History ==
In 1993, the band released his first single "Pinocchio" which used the music created by Italian composer Fiorenzo Carpi as the main theme for Luigi Comencini's 1972 TV miniseries Le avventure di Pinocchio. The song was a top ten hit in Belgium (Wallonia) and France.

A few months later, the duo released "Tu Tatuta Tuta Ta", which used a sample from "Living on Video" of Canadian band Trans-X (later used in 2006 by Pakito).

A third single, "Vai!!", was released in 1993 and peaked at #34 in France. An album with the same name was also launched.

The fourth single, "Enjoy the Music", reached #48 in France in April 1994.

French television host Nathalie Vincent was sometimes vocalist and dancer of the band for several songs.

== Discography ==
=== Albums ===
- 1993 : Pinocchio Vai!!

=== Singles ===
Year	Title	Peak chart positions					Album
Year	Title	NED	BEL (FLA)	FRA	SWI	EUR	Album
1993	"Pinocchio"	10	5	10	—	28	Pinocchio Vai !!
1993	"Tutatutatutata"	16	4	14	20	33	Pinocchio Vai !!
1993	"Pinocchio Vai !!"	—	45	34	—	—	Pinocchio Vai !!
1994	"Enjoy the Music"	—	—	48	—	—	Pinocchio Vai !!
1994	"Happy Gipsies"	—	—	—	—	—	Pinocchio Vai !!
1994	"The Return"	—	—	—	—	—	single only
"—" denotes releases that did not chart or were not released in that territory.
