= Pinocchio (instrumental) =

Electronic song recorded by Pin-Occhio

Single by Pin-Occhio

from the album Pinocchio Vai!!
- B-side: "Remix"
- Released: 1993
- Recorded: 1992–1993
- Genre: Eurodance, electronic
- Length: 4:10
- Label: Blow Up (Germany); Flarenasch (France) la-Pin-Production (Italy); Blanco Y Negro (Spain); Dino Music (Netherlands)
- Songwriter: Fiorenzo Carpi
- Producers: M. Biondi, M. Castelli, N. Savino

Pin-Occhio singles chronology
"Pinocchio" (1993)	"Tu Tatuta Tuta Ta" (1993)

"Pinocchio" is a 1972 instrumental composed by Fiorenzo Carpi for the soundtrack of Luigi Comencini's miniseries The Adventures of Pinocchio. In 1993, it was successfully covered by Eurodance music group Pin-Occhio which make it a number one hit in Belgium, and a top ten hit in Italy, France and the Netherlands. At the same time, it was also covered by Pepeto which was a top ten hit in Spain. In 2005, a massive hit was recorded by Pinocchio, an animated character, under the title "T'es pas cap Pinocchio".

== Pin-Occhio version ==
It was the debut single of the band off the album Pinocchio Vai!! on which it appears in two versions : 'Colladi rave remix' and 'original version'. The song achieved success, particularly in France where it hit number ten on 29 May 1993 and remained in the top 50 for 25 weeks, and in Belgium (Wallonia) where it reached number one for three weeks, and remained in the top ten for 15 weeks.

=== Track listings ===
These are the formats and track listings of major single releases of "Pinocchio".

CD single / Cassette / 7" single - France, Belgium
12" maxi - Spain, Italy

No.	Title	Length
1.	"Pinocchio" (legno mix)	4:10
2.	"Pinocchio" (fabia mix)	3:55

CD maxi / Cassette - Germany

No.	Title	Length
1.	"Pinocchio" (legno mix)	3:11
2.	"Pinocchio" (fabia mix)	3:57
3.	"Pinocchio" (collodi rave mix)	4:24
4.	"Pinocchio" (mastro ciliegia mix)	2:55
5.	"Pinocchio" (lucignolo version)	4:12
6.	"Techno Colour"	3:01

12" maxi - Germany

No.	Title	Length
1.	"Pinocchio" (collodi rave mix)	4:24
2.	"Pinocchio" (lucignolo version)	4:12
3.	"Pinocchio" (legno mix)	3:11
4.	"Pinocchio" (fabia mix)	3:57

CD maxi - Netherlands

No.	Title	Length
1.	"Pinocchio" (legno mix)	4:10
2.	"Pinocchio" (fabia mix)	3:55
3.	"Techno Colour"	3:30
4.	"Pinocchio" (collodi rave mix)	4:20
5.	"Pinocchio" (mastro ciliegia mix)	3:00

12" maxi - Remixes - Italy

No.	Title	Length
1.	"Pinocchio" (collodi rave mix)	4:20
2.	"Pinocchio" (mastro ciliegia mix)	3:00
3.	"Pinocchio" (lucignolo version)	4:10
4.	"Techno Colour"	3:30

=== Charts ===
==== Weekly charts ====
By Pin-Occhio

Chart (1993)	Peak position
Belgium (Ultratop 50 Flanders)	5
Belgium (Ultratop 50 Wallonia)	1
Europe (European Hot 100)	25
Italy (Musica e dischi)	4
France (SNEP)	10
Netherlands (Dutch Top 40)	11
Netherlands (Single Top 100)	10

By Pepeto

Chart (1993)	Peak position
France (SNEP)	21
Spain (AFYVE)	8

==== Year-end charts ====
Chart (1993)	Position
Belgium (Ultratop Flanders)	24
Europe (Eurochart Hot 100)	68
Netherlands (Dutch Top 40)	82
Netherlands (Single Top 100)	80

== Pinocchio versions ==
"T'es pas cap Pinocchio"

Single by Pinocchio

from the album Mon Alboum!
- B-side: "La chanson du Kazoo"
- Released: 3 July 2005
- Length: 3:15
- Label: Lavista, EMI Music
- Songwriters: Bruno Berrebi, Fiorenzo Carpi, Thierry Sforza
- Producer: Bruno Berrebi

Pinocchio singles chronology
"T'es pas cap Pinocchio" (2005)	"Pinocchio en hiver (Kalinka)" (2005)

Pinocchio, an animated character, recorded a cover of this song under the title "T'es pas cap Pinocchio" and added lyrics devoted to children. It was the lead single off the album Mon Alboum! and was a hit in France and Belgium (Wallonia), reaching number two in both regions. In France, it remained in the top 100 for 39 weeks and earned a Diamond sales certification. A German-language version of "T'es pas cap Pinocchio" was also created, called "Klick Klack". This version reached the top five in Austria, Germany, and Switzerland.

=== Track listings ===
CD single

No.	Title	Length
1.	"T'es pas cap Pinocchio" (radio edit)	3:15
2.	"La chanson du Kazoo"	3:22
3.	"T'es pas cap Pinocchio" (music video)	3:20

Digital download

No.	Title	Length
1.	"T'es pas cap Pinocchio" (radio edit)	3:15

CD maxi – Germany

No.	Title	Length
1.	"Klick Klack"	3:15
2.	"Lo fai o no Pinocchio" (Italienische Version)	3:15
3.	"T'es pas cap Pinocchio" (Französische Version)	3:15
4.	"La chanson du Kazoo"	3:21
5.	"Klick Klack" (Videoclip)	3:15

=== Charts ===
==== Weekly charts ====
"T'es pas cap Pinocchio"

Chart (2005)	Peak position
Belgium (Ultratop 50 Wallonia)	2
Europe (Eurochart Hot 100)	7
France (SNEP)	2
Switzerland (Schweizer Hitparade)	16

"Klick Klack"

Chart (2006)	Peak position
Austria (Ö3 Austria Top 40)	4
Europe (Eurochart Hot 100)	14
Germany (GfK)	3
Switzerland (Schweizer Hitparade)	5

==== Year-end charts ====
"T'es pas cap Pinocchio"

Chart (2005)	Position
Belgium (Ultratop 50 Wallonia)	6
Europe (Eurochart Hot 100)	22
France (SNEP)	4
Switzerland (Schweizer Hitparade)	81

"Klick Klack"

Chart (2006)	Position
Austria (Ö3 Austria Top 40)	40
Germany (Media Control GfK)	34
Switzerland (Schweizer Hitparade)	78

=== Certifications ===
Region	Certification	Certified units/sales
Belgium (BRMA)	Gold	25,000^{*}
France (SNEP)	Diamond	500,000^{*}
^{*} Sales figures based on certification alone.
