= Niagara (band) =

French new wave/rock band

- Origin: Rennes, France
- Genres: Synth-pop; new wave; rock
- Years active: 1984–1993
- Labels: Polydor
- Past members: Muriel Moreno; Daniel Chenevez; José Tamarin (†)

Niagara was a French rock band that achieved popularity both in France and Canada in the 1980s and early 1990s. The band, who was known under the name L'Ombre jaune from 1982 to 1984, was formed in Rennes, France by vocalist Muriel Laporte (later known as Muriel Moreno) and keyboardist Daniel Chenevez. Early on, the band also included guitarist José Tamarin, although he left before the release of their first album.

Evolving from a new wave and synth-pop style on their earlier albums to a more rock-oriented style on their later ones, they were frequently compared to the British duo Eurythmics.

== Biography ==
The band originally took their name from the 1953 Marilyn Monroe film Niagara.

They became famous in France when they issued in 1985 their first single, "Tchiki boum" (a Top 20 hit), which was followed in the summer 1986 by their second single and Top 5 hit, "L'Amour à la plage". 200,000 copies of each single were sold in France. Driven by Laporte's charisma and vocal style, the duo released their debut album in 1986, Encore un dernier baiser which included their first two successes and two new singles, "Je dois m'en aller" and "Quand la ville dort" (both also reaching the Top 20).

Their second and most popular release was the album Quel enfer! in 1988; the video for its single "Soleil d'hiver" received frequent airplay in Canada, leading to the group forming a following in North America. This song was also a hit in France, reaching n°12, and two other singles from the album ("Assez !" and "Flammes de l'Enfer") entered the French Top 50.

Their next album, Religion (1990), introduced a harder-edged sound to their music. Its singles "J'ai vu" and "Pendant que les champs brûlent" became minor hits in central Europe and reached the French Top 50.
Around this time, they received some interest from record labels in the United States, but declined a deal as it was conditional on the band recording an English language version of the album. However, their tour to support the album included their first major concert dates in Canada, including five shows at The Spectrum in Montreal, one at the National Arts Centre in Ottawa, and one show in Toronto.

They released their fourth and final album, La Vérité, in 1992. They toured Canada again in 1993 to support the album, playing eight dates in Quebec and New Brunswick including a show at the Montreal Forum.

Following La Vérité, the band and the real-life couple of Laporte/Moreno-Chenevez separated. Both musicians went on to solo careers.

In 2002, a compilation entitled Flammes was released as a double CD and DVD, containing all the band's hits. It hit No. 1 for three weeks on the French Compilations Chart.

== Discography ==
=== Albums ===
- 1986 : Encore un dernier baiser
- 1988 : Quel enfer !
- 1990 : Religion
- 1992 : La Vérité

=== Compilations ===
- 2002 : Flammes

=== Singles ===
- 1985 : "Tchiki boum"
- 1986 : "L'amour à la plage"
- 1986 : "Je dois m'en aller"
- 1987 : "Quand la ville dort"
- 1988 : "Assez !"
- 1988 : "Soleil d'hiver"
- 1989 : "Flammes de l'enfer"
- 1989 : "Baby Louis"
- 1990 : "J'ai vu"
- 1990 : "Pendant que les champs brûlent"
- 1991 : "Psychotrope"
- 1991 : "La vie est peut-être belle"
- 1992 : "La fin des étoiles"
- 1993 : "Un million d'années"
- 1993 : "Le minotaure"
