= Étienne Daho discography =

- Studio albums: 15
- Live albums: 7
- Compilation albums: 8
- Singles: 49

This article presents the discography of the French pop singer-songwriter Étienne Daho.

== Albums ==
=== Studio albums ===
Year	Title	Chart						Sales	Certifications
Year	Title	FRA	FR DD	BEL (Fl)	BEL (Wa)	IT	SWI	Sales	Certifications
1981	Mythomane	—	—	—	—	—	—		
1984	La Notte, la notte	—	—	—	—	—	—		SNEP: 2× Gold
1985	Tombé pour la France ^{1}	—	—	—	—	—	—		
1986	Pop Satori	5	—	—	—	—	—	FRA: 500,000	SNEP: Platinum
1988	Pour nos vies martiennes	4	—	—	—	—	—		SNEP: Platinum
1991	Paris ailleurs	10	—	—	—	—	—	FRA: 700,000	SNEP: Platinum
1995	Reserection ^{2}	12	—	—	22	—	—		
1996	Eden	7	—	—	8	—	—	FRA: 200,000	SNEP: Gold
2000	Corps et Armes	1	—	—	3	—	64		SNEP: Gold
2003	Réévolution	5	—	—	2	—	56		SNEP: Gold
2007	L'Invitation	2	1	—	9	—	51		SNEP: Platinum
2010	Le Condamné à mort (with Jeanne Moreau)	35	12	—	46	—	—		
2013	Les chansons de l'innocence retrouvée	3	—	120	6	—	34		SNEP: Platinum
2017	Blitz	4	—	—	5	—	23		SNEP: Gold
2023	Tirer la nuit sur les étoiles	1	—	—	1	90	10		SNEP: Gold

- ^{1} Mini-album.
- ^{2} EP, charted in the singles charts, sometimes under the title "Jungle Pulse".

=== Live albums ===
Year	Title	Chart			Certifications
Year	Title	FR	BEL (Wa)	SWI	Certifications
1989	Live ED	12	—	—	SNEP: 2× Gold
1993	Daholympia	3	—	—	SNEP: 2× Gold
2001	Daho Live	25	17	—	
2005	Sortir ce soir (Best of Live)	10	10	96	SNEP: Gold
2009	Daho Pleyel Paris	19	22	—	
2014	Diskönoir	53	54	—	
2024	Étienne Live	24	32	—	

=== Compilations ===
Year	Title	Chart			Certifications
Year	Title	FR	BEL (Wa)	SWI	Certifications
1987	Collection	—	—	—	
1995	Popzone	—	—	—	
1998	Singles	3	4	—	SNEP: Platinum
2002	Dans la peau de Daho	—	—	—	
2008	Tombés pour Daho	114	—	—	
2011	Monsieur Daho	44	34	—	
2015	L'homme qui marche	14	17	76	
2025	L'adorer	34	48	—	

== Extended plays ==
Year	Title	Chart
Year	Title	BEL (Wa)
2021	The Virus X Experience Edition	49

== Singles ==
=== Complete singles ===
Year	Title
1981	"Il ne dira pas"
1982	"Le Grand Sommeil"
1983	"Sortir ce soir"
1984	"Week-end à Rome"
1985	"Tombé pour la France"
1986	"Épaule tatoo"
1986	"Duel au soleil"
1988	"Bleu comme toi"
1988	"Des heures hindoues"
1989	"Caribbean Sea"
1989	"Stay with me"
1989	"Le Grand Sommeil" (live)
1990	"Le Plaisir de perdre" (live)
1991	"Saudade"
1992	"Des attractions désastre"
1992	"Les Voyages immobiles"
1993	"Comme un igloo"
1993	"Un homme à la mer"
1993	"Mon manège à moi"

Year	Title
1995	"Jungle Pulse"
1995	"Tous les goûts sont dans ma nature" (with Jacques Dutronc)
1996	"He's on the Phone" (with Saint Etienne)
1996	"Au commencement"
1996	"A New World"
1997	"Me manquer"
1997	"Soudain"
1997	"Les Bords de Seine"
1998	"Le Premier Jour"
1998	"Idéal"
1999	"Sur mon cou" (live)
2000	"Le Brasier"
2000	"La Nage indienne"
2000	"Rendez-vous à Vedra"
2001	"Ouverture"
2001	"Comme un boomerang" (with Dani)

Year	Title
2003	"Retour à toi"
2004	"If" (with Charlotte Gainsbourg)
2004	"Réévolution"
2005	"Sortir ce soir"
2007	"L'Invitation"
2008	"Obsession"
2008	"La vie continuera"
2008	"L'adorer"
2013	"Les chansons de l'innocence"
2013	"Le peau dure"
2014	"En surface" / "En surface (Rone Remix)"
2016	"Paris sens interdits"
2017	"Les flocons de l'été"

=== Charting singles ===
Year	Title	Chart		Album
Year	Title	FR	BEL (Wa)	Album
1984	"Week-end à Rome"		—	La Notte, la notte
1985	"Tombé pour la France"	13	—	Tombé pour la France/Pop Satori
1986	"Epaule tattoo"	39	—	Pop Satori
1987	"Duel au soleil"	17	—	Pop Satori
1988	"Bleu comme toi"	30	—	Pour nos vies martiennes
1992	"Saudade"	26	—	Paris ailleurs
1992	"Des attractions désastres"	25	—	Paris ailleurs
1992	"Les voyages immobiles"	37	—	Paris ailleurs
1993	"Mon manège à moi"	4	—	Daholympia
1996	"Tous les goûts sont dans ma nature" (with Jacques Dutronc)	39	—	Brèves Rencontres
1998	"Le premier jour du reste de ta vie"	30	22	Singles
2001	"Rendez-vous à Vedra"	71	—	Corps et Armes
2001	"Comme un boomerang" (with Dani)	6	23	Daho Live
2004	"If" (with Charlotte Gainsbourg)	42	21	Réévolution
2007	"L'invitation"	—	9^{3}	L'invitation
2013	"Les chansons de l'innocence"	64	5^{3}	Les chansons de l'innocence retrouvée
2013	"La peau dure"	64	6^{3}	Les chansons de l'innocence retrouvée
2015	"Paris sens interdits"	84	9^{3}	L'homme qui marche
2017	"Les flocons de l'été"	9	—	Blitz

- ^{3} Single did not appear in the official Belgian Ultratop 50 charts, but rather in the bubbling under Ultratip charts.

== Videos ==
- Une nuit Satori à l'Olympia (1987, Virgin Video)
- Tant pis pour l'Idaho! (1989, Virgin Video)
- "Paris Ailleurs", le film et les Clips (1993, Virgin) - SNEP: Platinum
- DahOlympia (1994, Virgin)
- Intégrale Clips (1998, Virgin)
- Daho Live (2001, Virgin)
- Sortir ce soir - Live 2004 (2005, Capitol Music) - SNEP: Gold
- An Evening With Daho (2008, Capitol Music)
