= Cocoon (band) =

French pop-folk band

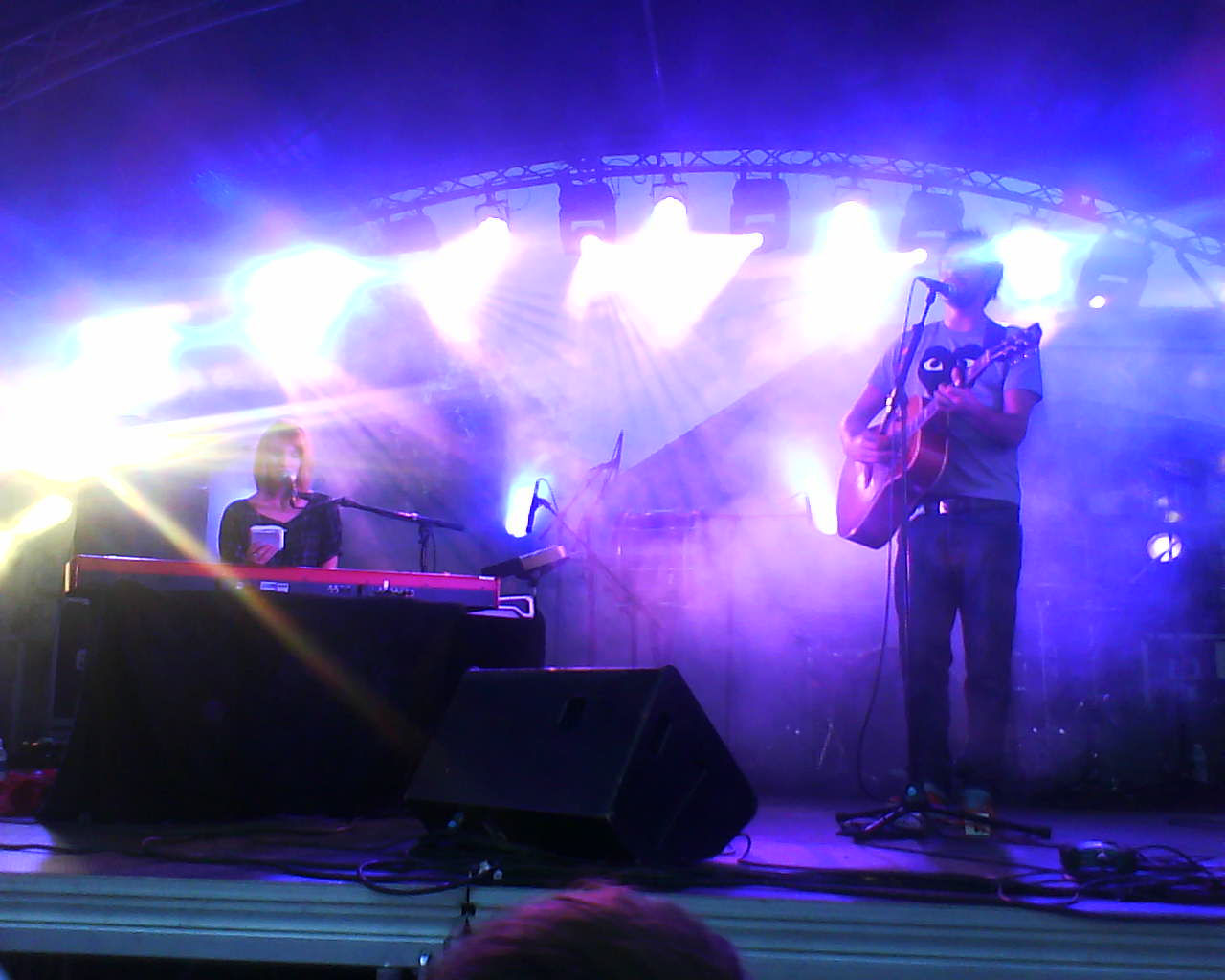
- Cocoon in 2009

Background information
- Origin: France
- Genres: Folk pop, folk, pop rock
- Years active: 2006-present
- Label: Barclay
- Members: Mark Daumail
- Past members: Morgane Imbeaud

Cocoon is a French pop-folk band from Clermont-Ferrand (France) that sings in English. It was created in 2006 by Mark Daumail (born 6 December 1984), alongside Morgane Imbeaud. They released the albums My Friends all Died in a Plane Crash in 2007 and Where the Oceans End in 2010, which were defined by dual lead vocals from both, and by its coupling of mostly upbeat-sounding music and very dark lyrics.

Cocoon entered a hiatus in 2011. Daumail then tried to reunite with Imbeaud, but she was busy with other projects and felt that the new songs were Daumail's but not hers, and encouraged him to make the next album alone. The album, Welcome Home, was released in 2016.

== History ==
The band's first album, My Friends all Died in a Plane Crash, was released on 22 October 2007. It proved to be an international commercial and critical success selling over 150,000 copies and certified platinum in France.

After their first album, Cocoon released the live CD/DVD, Back to Panda Mountains, on 7 September 2009. Following the release of a live CD/DVD, they went on a world tour, dubbed the "Baby Panda Tour".

In April 2010, the band started to record their second studio album, Where the Oceans End. This second record also went platinum, selling more than 150,000 copies worldwide.

In 2012, Cocoon entered a hiatus, due to the duo being tired after touring extensively, and wanting to focus on other projects.

During this hiatus, Daumail started to write songs while at the hospital, during his and his family's stay due to his son being born with cardiac problems. He soon realized that those songs were made for Cocoon, and contacted Imbeaud for a reunion. However, she was busy with other projects; she insisted that Daumail would do the new album without her, as its themes were more personal for him. He decided not to replace her by another female singer, and made the album as a sole member.

The album, Welcome Home, featuring Matthew E. White and Natalie Prass, was released in 2016 to similar commercial and critical success.

=== Mark Daumail ===
In 2014, Mark Daumail released his solo album entitled Speed of Light that has charted on SNEP Official French Albums Chart and on Ultratop Belgian Wallonia Albums Chart.

== Discography ==
=== Albums ===
- My Friends all Died in a Plane Crash (2007)
- Where the Oceans End (2010)
- Welcome Home (2016)
- Wood Fire (2019)

=== EP ===
- I Hate Birds (2006)
- From Panda Mountains (2007)
- Covers (2011)
- Pacific Palace (2021)

=== Singles ===
- On My Way (September 2007)
- Chupee (November 2008)
- Owls (version live) (October 2009)
- Comets (September 2010)
- Oh My God (December 2010)
- American Boy (April 2011)
- Dee Doo (December 2011)
- I Can't Wait (March 2016)
- Get Well Soon (October 2016)
- Miracle (April 2017)
- Spark (May 2019)
- Back to One (May 2019)
- I Got You (September 2019)
- Baby (October 2019)
- Blue Night (January 2021)
- The Road (March 2021)

=== DVD ===
- Back to Panda Mountains (2009)

== Sources ==
- Anissa Boumachouene, "Cocoon - The Band that is going high", Brain Magazine, 11 June 2007.
