= L'Amour à la plage =

Single by Niagara

from the album Encore un dernier baiser
- Language: French
- Released: 1986
- Length: 3:22
- Label: Polydor
- Songwriter: Muriel Laporte

Niagara singles chronology
"Tchiki boum" (1985)	"L'Amour à la plage" (1986)	"Je dois m'en aller" (1986)

Music video
- "L'Amour à la plage" on YouTube

"L'Amour à la plage" is a song by the French band Niagara, written by band's member Muriel Laporte. Originally issued as a single, it was included on their debut album Encore un dernier baiser, released in the autumn of the same year 1986. By the time the single came out, the band became a duo, as guitarist José Tamarin left the trio after the release of their debut single "Tchiki boum".

== Analysis ==
According to Jean-Emmanuel Deluxe and his book Yé-Yé Girls of '60s French Pop, the song "L'Amour à la plage" "was emblematic of the country's desire to escape the grim reality of the economic crisis of the mid-1980s".

The refrain is inspired by a melody from the 5th act of the opera Don Quichotte, written by French composer Jules Massenet.

== Chart performance ==
In France, "L'Amour à la plage" debuted at number 39 on the chart edition of 21 June 1986, reached a peak of number five nine weeks later, which remained Niagara's highest position on the French Singles Chart, and spent a total of 19 weeks in the top 50, eight of them in the top ten. It was certified Silver disc by the Syndicat National de l'Édition Phonographique. On the Music & Media's pan-Eurochart Hot 100 chart, it started at number 83 on 19 July 1986, attained a peak of number 30 twice, and fell off the chart after 16 weeks of presence. It also spent 13 weeks on the Eurochart Airplay Top 50 with a peak at number 23 twice.

== Cover versions ==
"L'Amour à la plage" was covered, among others, by Lorie, Virginie Ledoyen, Suarez, Alice et Moi & Alice on the Roof, and by Collectif Métissé. There is also a cover in Vietnamese by Ngọc Lan with the name Tình Yêu Biển Xanh.

== Track listings ==
- 7" single Polydor 883 991-7 (1986)
1. "L'amour à la plage" (3:22)
2. "Les amants" (2:42)
- 12" maxi single Polydor 883 991-1 (1986)
1. "L'amour à la plage (Version Longue)" (4:36)
2. "Les amants" (2:42)

== Charts and certifications ==
=== Weekly charts ===
Weekly chart performance for "L'Amour à la plage"
Chart (1986)	Peak position
Europe (European Hot 100)	30
Europe (European Airplay Top 50)	23
France (SNEP)	5
Quebec (Francophone chart)	22

=== Certifications ===
Certifications and sales for "L'Amour à la plage"
Region	Certification	Certified units/sales
France (SNEP)	Silver	250,000^{*}
^{*} Sales figures based on certification alone.
