= Petit Papa Noël =

Single by Tino Rossi
- B-side: "Minuit, Chrétiens"
- Recorded: 1946
- Genre: Christmas song
- Length: 3:07
- Label: Disques Pathé, Fifty Five, M6 Interactions
- Songwriter(s): Raymond Vincy; Henri Martinet

"Petit Papa Noël" (literally Little Father Christmas) is a 1946 song recorded by French singer Tino Rossi. Written by Raymond Vincy (lyrics) and Henri Martinet (music), this Christmas song was originally performed by Rossi in Richard Pottier's film Destins. Since its initial recording, over 30 million copies have been sold worldwide. The song peaked at No. 6 on 28 December 1991 (the French SNEP Singles Chart was created on 4 November 1984), and was ranked every year under several labels, including Disques Pathé, Fifty Five and M6 Interactions (every label is charted separately). The song has been covered by many artists over the years.

== Track listings ==
Tino Rossi

CD single – 1992 version

1. "Petit Papa Noël" – 3:07
2. "Minuit, chrétiens" – 3:11

CD single – Disques Pathé

1. "Petit Papa Noel" – 3:07
2. "Vive le vent" – 2:30
3. "Douce nuit" – 2:05
4. "Noël des enfants oubliés" – 2:45

CD single – Fifty Five

1. "Petit Papa Noël"
2. "Ave Maria"
3. "Mon étoile"
4. "Minuit Chrétien"

Bébé Lilly

CD single

1. "Petit Papa Noël" – 3:26
2. "Vive le vent d'hiver" – 2:00
3. "Mon beau sapin, roi des forêts" – 2:09
4. "Bonne année" – 3:28

Pinocchio & Marilou

CD single

1. "Petit Papa Noël" – 3:59
2. "Sous la neige étoilée" by Pinocchio – 4:16

== Charts ==
Chart	Peak position
Tino Rossi (from 1984)
French SNEP Singles Chart^{1}	6
French SNEP Singles Chart^{2}	17
French SNEP Singles Chart^{3}	17
French SNEP Singles Chart^{4}	29
French SNEP Singles Chart^{5}	9
The Smurfs (1996)
French SNEP Singles Chart	21
Roch Voisine (2000)
French SNEP Singles Chart	49
Roberto Alagna (2003)
French SNEP Singles Chart	91
Pinocchio & Marilou (2005)
Belgian (Wallonia) Singles Chart	17
French SNEP Singles Chart	7
Swiss Singles Chart	23
Bébé Lilly (2006)
French SNEP Singles Chart	5
Swiss Singles Chart	41
Josh Groban (2008)
French SNEP Singles Chart	12

^{1} Original version
^{2} "Petit Papa Noël / Minuit, chrétiens"
^{3} Disques Pathé label
^{4} Fifty Five label
^{5} M6 Interactions label

== See also ==
- List of Christmas carols
