= Susan Shopmaker =

American casting director

- Education: Kirkland College
- Occupations: Casting director, lecturer at State University of New York at Purchase

Susan Shopmaker is an American casting director. She is best known for her work casting for independent films. In 2024, she was awarded the BAFTA Award for Best Casting for The Holdovers.

== Early life and education ==
Shopmaker received a bachelor's degree from Kirkland College in 1978, prior to the institution's absorption into Hamilton College.

== Career ==
In addition to her work as a casting director, Shopmaker serves as a lecturer at State University of New York at Purchase.

== Filmography ==
=== Film ===
| Year | Title | Notes |
|---|---|---|
| 1987 | Salvation! | Extras casting |
| 1988 | Stars and Bars | Extras casting, New York |
| 1988 | Call Me | Extras casting |
| 1988 | Vampire's Kiss | Extras casting |
| 1990 | Alligator Eyes | —N/a |
| 1991 | Liebestraum | Casting associate |
| 1991 | Night on Earth | Extras casting, New York |
| 1992 | Das war der wilde Osten | New York casting |
| 1993 | Three of Hearts | Extras casting, New York |
| 1994 | Dead Funny | —N/a |
| 1996 | Ed's Next Move | —N/a |
| 1997 | Hurricane Streets | —N/a |
| 1997 | L'amico di Wang | —N/a |
| 1997 | Ties to Rachel | —N/a |
| 1997 | Obsession | New York casting |
| 1998 | Desert Blue | —N/a |
| 1998 | Shadrach | New York casting |
| 1998 | Undercurrent | New York casting |
| 1999 | Trick | —N/a |
| 1999 | The Waiting Game | —N/a |
| 1999 | Speed of Life | —N/a |
| 1999 | Story of a Bad Boy | —N/a |
| 2000 | Crime + Punishment in Suburbia | —N/a |
| 2000 | The Magic of Marciano | —N/a |
| 2000 | 75 Degrees in July | —N/a |
| 2000 | João Mata Sete | —N/a |
| 2001 | Diary of a City Priest | —N/a |
| 2001 | Hedwig and the Angry Inch | —N/a |
| 2001 | Double Whammy | —N/a |
| 2001 | Series 7: The Contenders | —N/a |
| 2001 | Acts of Worship | —N/a |
| 2001 | Relative Evil | —N/a |
| 2002 | Garmento | —N/a |
| 2002 | The Other Brother | —N/a |
| 2003 | Party Monster | —N/a |
| 2003 | Happy End | —N/a |
| 2003 | In Search of an Impotent Man | United States casting |
| 2003 | Something's Gotta Give | New York casting |
| 2004 | Evergreen | —N/a |
| 2004 | Duane Incarnate | —N/a |
| 2004 | Mean Girls | New York casting |
| 2004 | Invitation to a Suicide | Casting consultant |
| 2005 | The Motel | —N/a |
| 2005 | Red Doors | —N/a |
| 2005 | Lenny the Wonder Dog | —N/a |
| 2005 | Road | —N/a |
| 2005 | Mouth to Mouth | United States casting |
| 2006 | The Last Romantic | —N/a |
| 2006 | Full Grown Men | —N/a |
| 2006 | Just Like the Son | —N/a |
| 2006 | Shortbus | —N/a |
| 2006 | Trapped Ashes | —N/a |
| 2006 | Sisters | —N/a |
| 2006 | Glory Road | New York casting |
| 2006 | The Holiday | New York casting |
| 2007 | Great World of Sound | —N/a |
| 2007 | West 32nd | —N/a |
| 2007 | Walk the Talk | —N/a |
| 2007 | Neal Cassady | —N/a |
| 2007 | Enchanted | New York casting |
| 2008 | Henry May Long | —N/a |
| 2008 | Afterschool | —N/a |
| 2008 | Make Yourself at Home | —N/a |
| 2008 | American Violet | —N/a |
| 2008 | Santa Mesa | Additional casting |
| 2009 | Children of Invention | —N/a |
| 2009 | The Exploding Girl | —N/a |
| 2009 | Year of the Carnivore | —N/a |
| 2009 | The Undying | —N/a |
| 2009 | Jonas Brothers: The 3D Concert Experience | Extras casting |
| 2009 | The Maiden Heist | New York casting |
| 2010 | Beware the Gonzo | —N/a |
| 2010 | Two Gates of Sleep | —N/a |
| 2011 | Martha Marcy May Marlene | —N/a |
| 2012 | Simon Killer | —N/a |
| 2012 | King Kelly | —N/a |
| 2012 | The Magic of Belle Isle | —N/a |
| 2012 | Not Waving But Drowning | —N/a |
| 2012 | Petunia | —N/a |
| 2013 | Deep Powder | —N/a |
| 2013 | Teenage | —N/a |
| 2013 | The Happy Sad | —N/a |
| 2013 | Stand Clear of the Closing Doors | —N/a |
| 2013 | Finding Neighbors | —N/a |
| 2013 | Haunter | Additional casting |
| 2014 | God's Pocket | —N/a |
| 2014 | Listen Up Philip | —N/a |
| 2014 | That Awkward Moment | —N/a |
| 2014 | Rivers of Fundament | —N/a |
| 2014 | The Heart Machine | —N/a |
| 2014 | Hunter&Game | —N/a |
| 2014 | Buttercup Bill | New York casting |
| 2015 | James White | —N/a |
| 2015 | Don't Worry Baby | —N/a |
| 2015 | Those People | —N/a |
| 2015 | Chronic | —N/a |
| 2016 | Goat | —N/a |
| 2016 | Frank & Lola | —N/a |
| 2016 | Punk's Dead: SLC Punk 2 | —N/a |
| 2016 | Approaching the Unknown | —N/a |
| 2016 | Imperium | —N/a |
| 2016 | Tramps | —N/a |
| 2017 | Where is Kyra? | —N/a |
| 2017 | Beach Rats | —N/a |
| 2017 | Super Dark Times | —N/a |
| 2017 | Maya Dardel | —N/a |
| 2017 | After Louie | —N/a |
| 2017 | Mobile Homes | —N/a |
| 2017 | First Reformed | —N/a |
| 2018 | Family Games | —N/a |
| 2018 | Beach House | —N/a |
| 2018 | Siberia | —N/a |
| 2018 | Rosy | —N/a |
| 2018 | Life Itself | New York casting |
| 2019 | Blood Bound | —N/a |
| 2019 | Low Tide | —N/a |
| 2019 | Sound of Metal | —N/a |
| 2019 | Angelfish | —N/a |
| 2019 | Blood Bound | —N/a |
| 2019 | Wallflower | —N/a |
| 2020 | The Nest | —N/a |
| 2020 | Minyan | —N/a |
| 2020 | The Big Ugly | —N/a |
| 2020 | Lost Girls and Love Hotels | —N/a |
| 2020 | Reunion | —N/a |
| 2021 | Superior | —N/a |
| 2021 | The Card Counter | —N/a |
| 2021 | Sundown | —N/a |
| 2021 | Bashira | —N/a |
| 2021 | I Am Mortal | —N/a |
| 2023 | Maggie Moore(s) | —N/a |
| 2023 | The Holdovers | —N/a |
| 2023 | Memory | —N/a |
| 2023 | The Iron Claw | —N/a |
| 2023 | Outrage | —N/a |
| 2024 | What We Find on the Road | —N/a |
| 2024 | La Cocina | —N/a |

=== Television ===
| Year | Title | Notes |
|---|---|---|
| 1997 | Smoke Alarm: The Unfiltered Truth About Cigarettes | TV movie |
| 1998 | World War Three | TV movie, New York casting |
| 2004 | Tanner on Tanner | —N/a |
| 2009 | We Are New York | 1 episode |
| 2011 | Skins | 10 episodes |
| 2011 | Who Killed Chandra Levy? | TV movie |
| 2013 – 2018 | A Crime to Remember | 37 episodes |
| 2014 | Gun Hill | TV movie |
| 2015 | Film U | Miniseries |
| 2017 | I, Witness | 3 episodes |
| 2018 – 2022 | Random Acts of Flyness | 12 episodes |
| 2020 | Grand Army | 9 episodes |
| 2023 | Dead Ringers | 6 episodes |

== Awards and nominations ==
| Year | Award | Category | Nominated work | Result | Ref. |
|---|---|---|---|---|---|
| 2005 | CineVegas International Film Festival | Special Jury Prize, Ensemble Acting | Red Doors | Won (Note: Shared with Lois Drabkin.) | |
| 2008 | Casting Society of America | Outstanding Achievement in Casting - Studio Feature - Comedy | Enchanted | Nominated (Note: Shared with John Papsidera and Marcia Ross) | |
| 2010 | Casting Society of America | Outstanding Achievement in Casting – Short Film | Mary Last Seen | Nominated | |
| 2010 | Casting Society of America | Outstanding Achievement in Casting – Low Budget Feature – Comedy or Drama | Afterschool | Nominated | |
| 2010 | Black Reel Awards | Black Reel Award for Best Ensemble | American Violet | Nominated | |
| 2012 | Casting Society of America | Outstanding Achievement in Casting – Low Budget Feature – Comedy or Drama | Martha Marcy May Marlene | Won | |
| 2016 | Casting Society of America | Outstanding Achievement in Casting – Low Budget Feature – Drama | James White | Nominated | |
| 2017 | Casting Society of America | Outstanding Achievement in Casting – Low Budget Feature – Comedy or Drama | Goat | Nominated (Note: Shared with D. Lynn Meyers.) | |
| 2018 | Casting Society of America | Outstanding Achievement in Casting – Low Budget Feature – Comedy or Drama | Beach Rats | Won | |
| 2020 | Casting Society of America | Outstanding Achievement in Casting - Live Television - Variety or Sketch Comedy | Random Acts of Flyness | Nominated (Note: Shared with Emily Fleischer.) | |
| 2020 | Casting Society of America | Outstanding Achievement in Casting – Micro Budget Feature – Comedy or Drama | Low Tide | Nominated | |
| 2021 | Semiramis Award for Excellence in Casting | Excellence in Casting | Sound of Metal | Nominated (Note: Shared with Lisa Lobel and Angela Peri.) | |
| 2021 | Casting Society of America | Outstanding Achievement in Casting – Low Budget Feature | Sound of Metal | Nominated | |
| 2024 | Casting Society of America | Outstanding Achievement in Casting – Low Budget Feature | Memory | Won | |
| 2024 | Casting Society of America | Outstanding Achievement in Casting – Studio or Independent Feature – Drama | The Iron Claw | Nominated (Note: Shared with Brent Caballero.) | |
| 2024 | Casting Society of America | Outstanding Achievement in Casting – Studio or Independent Feature – Comedy | The Holdovers | Won | |
| 2024 | Alliance of Women Film Journalists | Best Ensemble Cast | The Holdovers | Nominated | |
| 2024 | Astra Creative Arts Awards | Best Casting | The Holdovers | Nominated | |
| 2024 | BAFTA Awards | Best Casting | The Holdovers | Won | |
| 2024 | Chicago Indie Critics | Best Ensemble | The Holdovers | Nominated | |
| 2024 | Online Film & Television Association | Best Casting | The Holdovers | Nominated | |
| 2024 | Seattle Film Critics Society | Best Ensemble Cast | The Holdovers | Won | |
