= Rachel Pickup =

British actress

- Born: London, England
- Education: Royal Academy of Dramatic Art
- Occupation: Actress
- Years active: 1996–present

Rachel Pickup is a British theatre, television and film actress. Her first major role was as Kaye Bentley in the 10-part BBC TV series No Bananas, with Alison Steadman and Tom Bell. She has since appeared in many British and American TV shows and has worked extensively in theatre, playing most of the major Shakespearean heroines. She played Portia in The Merchant Of Venice at Shakespeare's Globe Theatre in London, opposite Jonathan Pryce.

Pickup appeared in Chronic starring Tim Roth and directed by 2012 Un Certain Regard winner, Michel Franco.

== Early life ==
Her father is actor Ronald Pickup, and she grew up in a theatrical family. She joined the National Youth Theatre and studied at the Royal Academy of Dramatic Art (RADA).

== Career ==
Before graduating from RADA, Pickup won a part in the BBC series No Bananas, playing the role of Kaye Bentley, her first professional engagement. This was followed by a role opposite Alan Bates in Mike Poulton's Fortune's Fool. Other major theatre roles followed, including Irina in Mike Poulton's translation of Three Sisters for Bill Bryden, Olivia in Twelfth Night for Terry Hands, Helena in All's Well That Ends Well for Irina Brook, Portia in Julius Caesar for David Farr at the RSC, Sylvia in The Two Gentlemen of Verona and Helena in A Midsummer Night's Dream also for the RSC.

In 2003, Pickup appeared at The Old Vic in King Lear playing Cordelia. This was followed by Ophelia in Calixto Bieito's Hamlet, and Helen of Troy in Troilus and Cressida for Peter Stein. She had a supporting role in the film Basil and AKA.

In 2011, she moved to the United States to appear in the Shakespeare Theatre Company's production of An Ideal Husband. In August 2011, she made her New York Off-Broadway debut in the Irish Repertory Theatre's 20th Anniversary production of Dancing at Lughnasa. Other productions at the Irish Repertory Theatre include Airswimming by Charlotte Jones for "Fallen Angel Theatre" and A Mind Bending Evening of Beckett for Robert Flanagan. In 2014, Pickup played Goneril at the new Polonsky Shakespeare Theatre for Theatre for a New Audience, in Brooklyn New York, opposite Michael Pennington's King Lear, and Amanda in director Darko Tresnjak's production of Private Lives at Hartford Stage, Connecticut, opposite American actor Ken Barnett.

Pickup played Portia in The Merchant Of Venice at Shakespeare's Globe Theatre in London, England, opposite Jonathan Pryce, directed by Jonathan Munby, and appeared in the feature film Chronic directed by Michel Franco, which was part of the official selection for the Palme d'Or at the 2015 Cannes Film Festival. She had a cameo role as Fausta Grables in Wonder Woman.

Pickup appeared with her father for the first time in 2008 in an episode of Midsomer Murders:The Magician’s Nephew and played Molly, the central role in her mother's first screenplay "G - Litter" in 2015.

Pickup starred at the Criterion Theatre in The 39 Steps and has worked with Sir Peter Hall several times, including his 2009 revival of Bedroom Farce.

== Awards ==
For Ophelia in Hamlet Pickup won a Herald Angel award. She also won a MEN Best Supporting Actress Award for her performance in Time and the Conways at the Royal Exchange theatre in Manchester. She was nominated for a Critics' Circle Best Actress Award for her performance in Miss Julie with Stephen Unwin at the Rose Theatre, Kingston.

== Filmography ==
=== Film ===
Year	Title	Role	Notes
1998	Basil	Clara Fairfax	
2002	AKA	Stella Primrose	
2015	Chronic	Sarah	
2016	The Merchant of Venice	Portia	
2017	Wonder Woman	Fausta Grables	
2020	The Skin Game	Mary Booker	

=== Television ===
Year	Title	Role	Notes
1994	Soldier Soldier	Cheryl	Episode: "Poles Apart"
1996	No Bananas	Kaye Bentley	10 episodes
2000, 2008, 2010, 2013, 2024	Doctors	Various roles	5 episodes
2001	Relic Hunter	Amanda Reardon	Episode: "The Royal Ring"
2001	Victoria & Albert	Lady Henrietta Standish	Television serial
2002	Jeffrey Archer: The Truth	Casino Girl	Television film
2004	Holby City	Kate Lewis	Episode: "Honour Thy Father"
2006	Rosemary & Thyme	Jenny Channing	Episode: "Enter Two Gardeners"
2006	Live!Girls! present Dogtown	Lesley Parkes	4 episodes
2008	Midsomer Murders	Isolde Balliol	Episode: "The Magician's Nephew"
2009	Small Island	Mrs. Ryder	Episode #1.1
2010	Garrow's Law	Maria Reader	Episode #2.2
2013	House of Anubis	Mara's lawyer	Episode: "House of Enemies"
2014	Elementary	Allison Fuller	Episode: "The Diabolical Kind"
2014	50 Ways to Kill Your Lover	Mickey Faveau	Episode: "Chickened Out"
2017	Great Performances	Understudy	Episode: "Present Laughter"
2018	Dietland	Mrs. Gormely	Episode: "F... This"
2018, 2019	Madam Secretary	Lana	2 episodes
2019	Grantchester	Meredith Davenport	Episode #4.5
2021	The Beast Must Die	India	Episode #1.3
2022	Sister Boniface Mysteries	Jocelyn Kelly	Episode: "Scoop!"
2023	Casualty	Christy Eakins	Episode: "Lost in Translation"
