= Cristina Velasco =

Mexican film producer

Cristina Velasco Lozano (Tijuana, Mexico), b. 1983 is a Mexican film producer, and a cofounder of Paloma Negra Films, a Mexican independent production company.

She started in cinema as the production coordinator of the feature film “Norteado” by Rigoberto Perezcano, the most awarded Mexican film of 2009. She later coordinated the production of “Morir de pié” by Jacaranda Correa, winner of best documentary at FIC Guadalajara.

Since then she has produced many works including: Granicero a documentary by Gustavo Gamou in 2011, Tijuana sonido del Nortec, by Alberto Cortés, The Naked Room by Nuria Ibáñez, winner of best documentary at the 2013 Morelia International Film Festival.

Cristina also produced Carmín Tropical by Rigoberto Perezcano, winner in Morelia 2015 and other international awards.

She is the producer of Eisenstein in Guanajuato by Peter Greenaway, premiered in competition at the 2015 Berlinale and sold in more than 20 countries. She is co-producer of Los Herederos by Jorge Hernandez Aldana and produced by Lucia Films.

In 2015, Cristina joined the Mexican Film Institute, IMCINE, as Director of Production. She was in charge of the FOPROCINE fund and the National Film Commission. A couple of years later, she directed EFICINE, a fiscal incentive for Mexican film production.

In 2018, she produced the documentary El Reino de la Sirena by Luis Rincón, which had its launch at the prestigious documentary festival, Dok Leipzig in Germany, it later showed at FICUNAM, the 2018 Ambulante Documentary Tour, among other festivals.

In 2019, she produced New Order by Michel Franco, winner of the Grand Jury Prize at the Venice Film Festival and was in the first place at the box office in Mexico for several weeks. That same year she completed the production of El Gran Fellove directed by actor and director Matt Dillon, which premiered at the San Sebastian Film Festival.

She produced for Teorema, the film Sundown by Michel Franco, which premiered in competition at the 2021 Biennale di Venezia, starring Tim Roth and Charlotte Gainsbourg. She is also the producer of Los Amantes se despiden con la mirada by Rigoberto Perezcano and Catire's shadow by Jorge Hernandez Aldana, which will premiere soon.

== Filmography ==
Year	Title	Type	Position	Awards and nominations
2002	Bulbo TV	TV Series	Creator and producer	
2009	Northless	Feature Film	Production supervicer	Best Movie, Golden Arie. Ariel Awards, 2010. Best Edition, Silver Ariel. Ariel Awards, 2010. Jury Prize, Latinamerican Film Festival Utrecht, 2010.
2011	Granicero	TV Documentary	Producer	Oficial Selection, FICUNAM, 2011. Oficial Selection, DOCSDF, 2011. Mexican Documentary Film Show at Ullens Center for Contemporary Art, Beijing China.
2012	Tijuana, sonidos del Nortec	Documentary	Line producer	
2013	The naked room	Documentary	Producer	Best documentary made by a woman Award, Morelia International Film Festival, 2013. Now Mexico Award, FICUNAM, 2013. Rendezvous With Madness Film Festival, 2013. Thessaloniki International Film Festival, 2013. Sarajevo Film Festival, 2014.
2014	Tropical Carmine	Feature Film	Producer	Best Screenplay Written Directly for the Screen, Silver Ariel, 2015. Best Feature Film, Morelia International Film Festival, 2015.
2015	Eisenstein in Guanajuato	Feature Film	Producer	Best Director, Silver Peacock. International Film Festival of India, 2015. Official selection, Berlin Film Festival, 2015. Ocaña Award, Seville European Film Festival, 2015.
2015	The Heirs	Feature Film	Co-producer	Breakthrough Actor, Silver Ariel (nominee). Ariel Awards, 2018.
2017	The Mermaid Kingdom	Feature Film	Producer	World Premiere at the DOK Leipzig Festival, 2017. LCI Insurance Award, FICUNAM, 2018.
2020	New Order	Feature Film	Producer	Best Special Effects, Silver Ariel. Ariel Awards, México, 2021. Best Films Openings, ICP Award. Indiewire Critics’ Poll, 2020. Best Latin American Picture, José María Forqué Awards, 2021. Best Non-U.S. Release, OFCS Award. Online Film Critics Society Awards, 2021. Impact Award, Stockholm Film Festival, 2020. Leoncino d’Oro Agiscuola Award, Venice Film Festival, 2020. Grand Jury Prize, Silver Lion. Venice Film Festival, 2020.
2019	Lover's fare goodbye	Feature Film - In post production	Producer	
2019	Catire's Shadow	Feature Film - In post production	Producer	
2020	The Great Fellove	Documentary	Producer	Official Section, San Sebastian International Film Festival, 2020.
2021	Sundown	Feature Film	Producer	Best Ibero-American Film, Palm Springs International Film Festival, 2021. Internacional Competition, Brussels International Film Festival, 2021. Best film, Venice Film Festival, 2021. Official competition, London Film Festival, 2021. Best feature, Chicago International Film Festival, 2021. Feature narrative competition, Silver Star, El Gouna Film Festival, 2021.
2023	Sierra Madre	TV Series	Producer	
2023	Zafari	Feature film - In post production	Producer	
2023	Wake of Umbra	Feature film - in production	Producer	
2023	Death has no master	Feature film - in development	Producer	
