= Tim Roth filmography =

Filmography

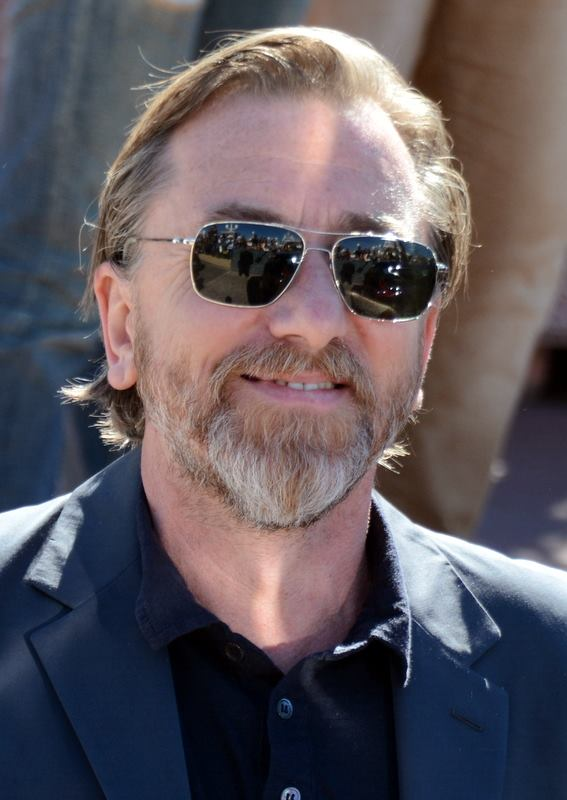
Roth at the 2015 Cannes Film Festival

Tim Roth is an English actor. He won the BAFTA Award for Best Actor in a Supporting Role and was nominated for the Academy Award and the Golden Globe Award in the same category for his role in Rob Roy.

== Film ==
Year	Title	Role	Notes
1984	The Hit	Myron	Nominated – BAFTA Award for Most Promising Newcomer to Leading Film Roles
1985	Return to Waterloo	Boy Punk	
1988	A World Apart	Harold	
1988	To Kill a Priest	Feliks	
1989	The Cook, the Thief, His Wife & Her Lover	Mitchel	
1990	Vincent & Theo	Vincent van Gogh	
1990	Farendj	Anton	
1990	Rosencrantz & Guildenstern Are Dead	Guildenstern	
1992	Backsliding	Tom Whitton	
1992	Reservoir Dogs	Freddy Newandyke / Mr. Orange	
1992	Jumpin' at the Boneyard	Manny	
1993	Bodies, Rest & Motion	Nick	
1993	El Marido perfecto	Milan	
1994	Captives	Philip Chaney	
1994	Little Odessa	Joshua Shapira	Nominated – Independent Spirit Award for Best Male Lead
1994	Pulp Fiction	Ringo / Pumpkin	
1995	Rob Roy	Archibald Cunningham	BAFTA Award for Best Actor in a Supporting Role; Kansas City Film Critics Circle Award for Best Supporting Actor; Nominated – Academy Award for Best Supporting Actor; Nominated – Golden Globe Award for Best Supporting Actor – Motion Picture; Nominated – Saturn Award for Best Supporting Actor
1995	Four Rooms	Ted	
1996	No Way Home	Joey	
1996	Everyone Says I Love You	Charles Ferry	
1997	Gridlock'd	Alexander 'Stretch' Rawland	
1997	Hoodlum	Dutch Schultz	
1997	Deceiver	James Walter Wayland	
1998	Animals	Henry	
1998	The Legend of 1900	Danny Boodman TD Lemon 1900	
1999	The War Zone	—N/a	Director; C.I.C.A.E. Award; Valladolid International Film Festival Silver Spike; European Film Award for European Discovery of the Year; Edinburgh International Film Festival for Best New British Feature; Tróia Award – First Works Section; Jury Award for Best Director & Best First Feature; Nominated – Bodil Award for Best Non-American Film; Nominated – Independent Spirit Award for Best Foreign Film
2000	The Million Dollar Hotel	Izzy Goldkiss	Uncredited
2000	Vatel	Marquis de Lauzun	
2000	Lucky Numbers	'Gig'	
2001	Planet of the Apes	General Thade	Nominated – Empire Award for Best British Actor; Nominated – MTV Movie Award for Best Villain; Nominated – Saturn Award for Best Supporting Actor
2001	Invincible	Hersche Steinschneider / Erik Jan Hanussen	
2001	The Musketeer	Febre	
2002	Emmett's Mark	John Harrett / Frank Dwyer	Nominated – DVD Exclusive Award for Best Supporting Actor in a DVD Premiere Movie
2003	To Kill a King	Oliver Cromwell	
2004	Battle of the Brave	William Pitt	
2004	The Beautiful Country	Captain Oh	
2004	Silver City	Mitch Paine	
2005	Don't Come Knocking	Sutter	
2005	Dark Water	Jeff Platzer	
2007	Even Money	Victor	
2007	Youth Without Youth	Dominic	
2007	Virgin Territory	Gerbino	
2007	Funny Games	George	
2008	The Incredible Hulk	Emil Blonsky / The Abomination	
2009	King Conqueror	King Pedro II of Aragon	
2010	Pete Smalls Is Dead	Pete Smalls	
2012	Arbitrage	Detective Michael Bryer	
2012	Broken	Archie	Stockholm International Film Festival Award for Best Actor
2012	Möbius	Rostovski	
2013	The Liability	Roy	
2014	Grace of Monaco	Prince Rainier III of Monaco	
2014	United Passions	Sepp Blatter	
2014	Selma	George Wallace	
2014	October Gale	Tom	
2015	600 Miles	Hank Harris	Executive producer Nominated – Ariel Award for Best Actor
2015	Chronic	David	Executive producer Nominated – Independent Spirit Award for Best Male Lead
2015	Hardcore Henry	Henry's Father	
2015	Mr. Right	Hopper	
2015	The Hateful Eight	'English' Pete Hicox / Oswaldo Mobray	
2017	1 Mile to You	Coach Jared	
2018	The Con Is On	Peter Fox	
2018	The Padre	The Padre	
2019	Luce	Peter Edgar	
2019	Once Upon a Time in Hollywood	Raymond	Scenes cut, but still credited
2019	The Song of Names	Martin Simmonds	
2019	QT8: The First Eight	Himself	Documentary film
2021	Bergman Island	Tony	
2021	The Misfits	Schultz	
2021	Shang-Chi and the Legend of the Ten Rings	Emil Blonsky / The Abomination	Uncredited cameo
2021	Sundown	Neil	
2022	Resurrection	David	
2022	There Are No Saints	Carl Abrahams	
2022	Punch	Stan	
2024	Poison	Lucas	
2024	Classified	Kevin Angler	
2025	Tornado	Sugarman	
2025	260 Days	Adult Marijan Gubina	
2026	Peaky Blinders: The Immortal Man	John Beckett	
2026	Seven Snipers	The Dragon	
TBA	A Colt Is My Passport †	TBA	Post-production
TBA	Projet K †	Klaus Barbie	Filming

== Television ==
Year	Title	Role	Notes
1982	Made in Britain	Trevor	Television film
1983	Meantime	Colin Pollock	Television film
1983	Not Necessarily the News	Gay Man	Episode: "Road Trip"
1985	Murder with Mirrors	Edgar Lawson	Television film
1986	King of the Ghetto	Matthew Long	4 episodes
1989	Theatre Night: Metamorphosis	Gregor Samsa	Television Film
1991	Tales from the Crypt	Jack Craig	Episode: "Easel Kill Ya"
1993	Murder in the Heartland	Charles Starkweather	2 episodes
1993	Heart of Darkness	Marlow	Television film
2006	Tsunami: The Aftermath	Nick Fraser	Television film
2009	Skellig	Skellig	Television film
2009–2011	Lie to Me	Dr. Cal Lightman	48 episodes People's Choice Award for Favorite TV Crime Fighter
2010	Sea Wolf	Death Larsen	2 episodes
2014	Klondike	The Count	6 episodes
2014	Robot Chicken	Frank / Police Officer (voice)	Episode: "Walking Dead Lobster"
2016	Reg	Reg Keys	Television film
2016	Rillington Place	John Christie	3 episodes
2017	Twin Peaks: The Return	Gary 'Hutch' Hutchens	5 episodes
2017–2020	Tin Star	Jim Worth	25 episodes
2022	She-Hulk: Attorney at Law	Emil Blonsky / The Abomination	4 episodes
2023	Last King of the Cross	Ezra Shipman	10 episodes
2023	Tiny Beautiful Things	Hayes MacKeown	Episode: "Go"

== Video games ==
Year	Game	Role
2008	The Incredible Hulk	Emil Blonsky / Abomination (voice)
