= Macbeth in Manhattan =

- Directed by: Greg Lombardo
- Written by: Greg Lombardo; Joe Gagen
- Produced by: Joe Gagen; Victoria Lang; Pier Paolo Piccoli
- Starring: Gloria Reuben; Nick Gregory; David Lansbury; John Glover; Harold Perrineau
- Cinematography: Leland Krane
- Edited by: Donna Stern
- Music by: John Hegner
- Production company: Cinbebard
- Distributed by: The Asylum
- Release date: 14 March 1999 (South by Southwest Film Festival)
- Running time: 97 minutes
- Country: United States
- Language: English

Macbeth in Manhattan is a 1999 American drama film directed by Greg Lombardo, starring Gloria Reuben, Nick Gregory, David Lansbury, John Glover and Harold Perrineau.

== Cast ==
- Gloria Reuben as Claudia/Lady Macbeth
- Nick Gregory as Max/Macduff
- David Lansbury as William/Macbeth
- John Glover as Richard/Director
- Harold Perrineau as Chorus
- Christopher McCann as Derek/Duncan
- Natalie Zea as Samantha/First Witch
- Carolyn Neff as Michelle/Second Witch
- Tertia Lynch as Wendy/Third Witch
- Lisa G as Reporter
- Jordan Bridges as Michael/Malcolm
- Michael Stuhlbarg as Robert/Ross
- John Elsen as Joe Connelly/Banquo
- Alan Pottinger as Jim/Murderer
- Amelia Campbell as Patty/Stage Manager
- Randi Rosenholtz as Roxy

== Reception ==
Sarah Hepola of The Austin Chronicle wrote that Lombardo has "pulled off the unlikely by digging inside perhaps the bleakest of all of Shakespeare's plays and not only making us think, but also making us laugh."

Emanuel Levy of Variety wrote that the film is "Nicely produced and decently acted" and that it "makes good use of a contempo New York setting to breathe new life into a classic play."

TV Guide wrote, "This intriguing and cleverly conceived independent production is undone by two miscalculations. Its light-hearted treatment of the actors' love triangle can't hold a candle to the unrelenting tragedy of MacBeth, and the personable cast isn't as good with Shakespeare as they with romantic comedy."
