= Memory (2023 film) =

Film by Michel Franco

- Release poster
- Directed by: Michel Franco
- Written by: Michel Franco
- Produced by: Michel Franco; Eréndira Núñez Larios; Alex Orlovsky; Duncan Montgomery
- Starring: Jessica Chastain; Peter Sarsgaard; Merritt Wever; Brooke Timber; Elsie Fisher; Josh Charles; Jessica Harper
- Cinematography: Yves Cape
- Edited by: Oscar Figueroa; Michel Franco
- Production companies: Teorema; High Frequency Entertainment; Screen Capital; MUBI; Case Study Films
- Distributed by: Ketchup Entertainment
- Release dates: 8 September 2023 (Venice); 22 December 2023 (United States)
- Running time: 99 minutes
- Country: United States
- Language: English
- Box office: $2.1 million

Memory is a 2023 American drama film starring Jessica Chastain as Sylvia, a single mother and social worker grappling with her past, and Peter Sarsgaard as Saul, a man suffering from early onset dementia, in a story that intertwines their troubled lives following a high school reunion. The film is written and directed by Michel Franco. It also stars Merritt Wever, Brooke Timber, Elsie Fisher, Josh Charles and Jessica Harper.

The film was selected to compete for the Golden Lion at the 80th Venice International Film Festival, where it premiered on 8 September 2023. Sarsgaard won the Volpi Cup for Best Actor for his performance. It was released in limited theaters in the United States on December 22, 2023, before expanding wide on January 5, 2024.

== Plot ==
Sylvia, a single mother, social worker, and recovering alcoholic, reluctantly attends a high school reunion with her younger sister Olivia. Sylvia is perturbed by a man who sits next to and smiles at her. She leaves the event and is followed home by the man, who waits outside in the rain.

In the morning, Sylvia finds him sleeping outside, wet, and barely responsive. She finds out his name is Saul and phones his brother, Isaac, to retrieve him. At Saul and Isaac's home she is offered an apology: Saul has early onset dementia, causing him to get disoriented and confused, and hindering his ability to recall or create memories.

Sylvia takes Saul to a park to ask why he followed her. Saul says he doesn't know and can't recall meeting her before, which upsets her. Sylvia tells Saul that in high school some of his classmates got her drunk and sexually assaulted her. Sylvia accuses Saul of participating but he insists he doesn't remember that. Enraged, Sylvia steals his necklace with emergency contact info in it, abandons him, changes her mind, returns the necklace, and helps get him home.

Sara, Isaac's daughter, offers Sylvia a second job caring for Saul during the day. Sylvia accepts after Olivia assures her that Saul joined their school after Sylvia transferred out, meaning he didn't assault her.

Sylvia spends time caring for Saul and they bond. Sylvia learns about Saul's deceased wife, a redhead like her, and he befriends Sylvia's teenage daughter Anna. One day, Sylvia and Saul fall asleep on a sofa holding each other and are found by Sara. Uncomfortable with the incident, Sylvia stops her visits. Saul leaves the house on his own to find her and they begin a romantic relationship, upsetting Isaac.

Anna secretly gets acquainted with Sylvia and Olivia's mother, Samantha, as Sylvia always had insisted they never contact her.

At Olivia's home, Sylvia is confronted by Samantha in front of Saul and Anna. Sylvia is scolded by her mother for dating a man with mental health issues and keeping Anna away from her. After she accuses Sylvia of lying about her assault in high school, Sylvia laments she was also sexually assaulted by her late father before that and Samantha's refusal to believe her is what drove her away. Olivia admits she remembers their father taking Sylvia into his room multiple times when they were children. When the younger Olivia asked Samantha about it, Olivia too was accused of lying too and slapped.

Retraumatized, Sylvia secludes herself at home as Saul cares for her. Olivia tries to see Sylvia, but is turned away by Anna who asks why she never confirmed Sylvia's abuse by their dad until now. Olivia says she was just a child and never sure if she could trust what she saw.

Sylvia returns to her daily routines with Saul's help. One night, Saul returns from the bathroom but gets confused about which bedroom door is Sylvia's and which is Anna's, so he decides to sit in the hallway. The next day, while alone, Saul falls from Sylvia's balcony and is hospitalized. Sylvia attempts to visit Saul but is stopped by Isaac.

Sylvia attempts to call Saul several times and leaves messages he doesn't respond to. Anna visits Saul's home and sees he has a full-time nurse. He was unable to contact Sylvia because Isaac confiscated his phone and forbade him from leaving the house. Anna convinces Saul to sneak out with her and leads him back to Sylvia who embraces him.

== Cast ==
- Jessica Chastain as Sylvia
- Peter Sarsgaard as Saul
- Merritt Wever as Olivia
- Jessica Harper as Samantha
- Elsie Fisher as Sara
- Brooke Timber as Anna
- Josh Charles as Isaac
- Tom Hammond as Robert

== Production ==
Filming wrapped in New York in May 2022. According to Variety, Chastain recommended Sarsgaard for the role of Saul.

== Release ==
Memory premiered at the 80th Venice International Film Festival on 8 September 2023. It had its North American premiere at the 2023 Toronto International Film Festival on 10 September 2023. In October 2023, Ketchup Entertainment acquired distribution rights to the film. The film was for a limited theatrical release in the United States on December 22, 2023, before a wide release on January 5, 2024. The film was released in the United Kingdom on February 23, 2024.

== Reception ==
On the review aggregator website Rotten Tomatoes, 85% of 111 critics' reviews are positive, with an average rating of 7/10. The website's consensus reads: "A searingly powerful union of filmmaker and cast, Memory finds writer/director Michel Franco exploring complex, mature themes brought brilliantly to life by stars Jessica Chastain and Peter Sarsgaard." Metacritic, which uses a weighted average, assigned the film a score of 71 out of 100, based on 31 critics, indicating "generally favorable" reviews.

=== Accolades ===
Year	Award / Film Festival	Category	Recipient(s)	Result	Ref(s)
2023	Venice International Film Festival	Golden Lion	Michel Franco	Nominated	
2023	Venice International Film Festival	Volpi Cup for Best Actor	Peter Sarsgaard	Won	
2023	Independent Spirit Awards	Best Lead Performance	Jessica Chastain	Nominated	
2024	Casting Society of America	Feature Low Budget – Comedy or Drama	Susan Shopmaker	Won	
