= New Order (film) =

2020 film

- Theatrical release poster
- Spanish: Nuevo orden
- Directed by: Michel Franco
- Written by: Michel Franco
- Produced by: Michel Franco; Cristina Velasco; Eréndira Núñez Larios
- Starring: Naian Gonzalez Norvind; Diego Boneta; Mónica Del Carmen; Fernando Cuautle; Darío Yazbek; Eligio Meléndez
- Cinematography: Yves Cape
- Edited by: Óscar Figueroa; Michel Franco
- Production companies: Teorema; Les Films d’Ici; The Match Factory; CNC; Institut Français
- Distributed by: Videocine
- Release dates: September 10, 2020 (Venice); October 22, 2020 (Mexico)
- Running time: 86 minutes
- Countries: Mexico; France
- Language: Spanish
- Box office: $2 million

New Order (Spanish: Nuevo orden) is a 2020 thriller art film. It takes place in a dystopian near future Mexico. It was written, directed, produced and edited by Michel Franco and is a French-Mexican co-production.

The film had its world premiere on September 10, 2020 at the Venice Film Festival, where it won the Grand Jury Prize. Shots of darker-skinned underclass attacking a lighter-skinned elite provoked a furious backlash on Mexican social media when its trailer was released because of its perceived racial stereotyping. The criticism towards the film continued after its premiere in theaters and still remained after its release in streaming. The film stars Naian González Norvind, Diego Boneta and Mónica Del Carmen.

== Synopsis ==
In 2020, the gap between social classes in Mexico is increasingly marked. A high-society wedding is interrupted by a group of armed and violent rioters who are part of an even larger uprising of the underprivileged, and take the participants as hostages. The Mexican Army exploits the disorder caused by the riots to establish a military dictatorship in the country. It involves the kidnappings of young adults, extortion, assaults, torture of the kidnapped while being held, and execution upon receiving no ransom, some of it, or all of it, by the Mexican military.

== Cast ==
- Naian Gonzalez Norvind as Marianne
- Diego Boneta as Daniel
- Mónica Del Carmen as Marta
- Fernando Cuautle as Cristian
- Darío Yazbek as Alan
- Eligio Meléndez as Rolando
- Roberto Medina as Iván
- Patricia Bernal as Pilar
- Lisa Owen as Rebeca
- Enrique Singer as Victor
- Gustavo Sánchez Parra as General Oribe

== Production ==
Michel Franco started to develop the idea in 2014, and finished the script in 2017. Production concluded in May, 2019. The cast included Naian Gonzalez Norvind, Diego Boneta, Mónica Del Carmen, Fernando Cuautle, Darío Yazbek Bernal and Eligio Meléndez.

== Release ==
The film had its world premiere on September 10, 2020 at the Venice Film Festival where it was awarded the Grand Jury Prize. It also screened at the Toronto International Film Festival on September 15, 2020. Shortly after, Neon acquired North American distribution rights to the film, while Mubi acquired distribution rights to the film in the U.K., India, Ireland, Latin America and Turkey. The film was released in Mexico on October 22, 2020, by Videocine. It was released in a limited release in the United States on May 21, 2021.

== Reception ==
=== Critical reception ===
New Order holds a 67% approval rating on review aggregator website Rotten Tomatoes, based on 104 reviews, with an average of 6.7/10. The website's critics consensus reads: "In spite of solid performances, New Order's merciless brutality and unfocused gaze threaten to derail its message." On Metacritic, the film holds a rating of 62 out of 100, based on 22 critics.

Peter Debruge of Variety said: "Essentially picking up where The Joker left off, this ultra-provocative case of speculative fiction promises a view of what change might look like, only to succumb to a deep sense of cynicism as the scope of the film becomes unmanageable."

IndieWire gave it a C+, as critic Nicholas Barber wrote: "It's a bold, angry, provocative indictment, but because Franco zooms back to the state-of-the-nation big picture, he loses sight of the characters who were sketched so sharply in the opening scenes. They’re still in the film, but they have so little agency and dialogue that they are reduced to counters on a board".

In Spain, newspaper El País wrote: "The film does not come close to the fine class analysis that Bong Joon-ho's Parasite made, because it fails to increasingly develop the unbearable tension between rich and poor... His chaos scenes are closer to those seen in Todd Phillips' Joker, but without an actor like Joaquin Phoenix to understand the depth of the madness". The sociologist David Leupold also sees a strong parallel between the two films, albeit, arrives at a more positive evaluation:

"New Order begins where Parasite ends ... In the case of Parasite we see the story unfolding from the perspective of the dispossessed family whereas in New Order it is through the perspective of an elite family subjected to violence by the dispossessed. What both films also have in common is the lack of clear moralizing attributes. Neither the elites appear as particularly vicious nor the disempowered as heroic ... It is clear that instead of self-righteous blaming, polemical simplifications and paternalizing moralizations, the directors are concerned with something else and much more decisive: exposing the acute structures of injustice and the imminent danger they harbour."

=== Backlash in Mexico ===
Prior to its release in Mexican cinemas, the film's trailer was received with an overwhelming negative response from the public and internet backlash as the scenes of the trailer was called by Mexican audiences on social media "Classist, racist and painfully stereotypical portraits of upper and lower classes in Mexico".

The racism accusations towards the film in Mexico worsened as director Michel Franco claimed the film was a target of "profound reverse racism" and felt himself as a victim of "hate crimes" as a White Mexican, in reference to the term Whitexican, used in the country to refer to racial inequalities in society. Franco would later post an apology on social media for his statements, claiming he was not aware of the impact of the terms he used towards the public's reception of the film trailer.

José Antonio Aguilar, executive director of RacismoMX, a nationwide initiative in Mexico to address issues of racism in the country said: “The film's trailer repeats many racial stereotypes: brown people are poor, they’re savages, they’re resentful and want revenge.”

After the release of the film, Erick Estrada from the website Cinegarage wrote: "[To] the ones who wish [to] revert [to] the establishment, [it is] a warning about the consequences of their acts than calling attention to how it was before the country's militarization." In Codigo Espaguetti, Nicolas Ruiz said the film is "[a criticism], with no empathy, from this cold distance that sees individuals as sheep and protesters as blood-thirsty zombies; it creates banal, shallow and Manichean representations".

Arturo Magaña Arce in Cine Premiere reiterated the same view when he said the film "gives reason to those who judge people who, in a desperate way, [seek to] reclaim justice from the streets".

== See also ==
- Elite panic
