= Christopher McCann =

American actor

- Born: September 29, 1952 (age 73); New York City, New York, U.S.
- Education: St. Francis Preparatory School; New York University
- Occupation: Actor

Christopher McCann (born September 29, 1952) is an American theater, film and television actor. He was nominated for a Drama Desk Award and won an Obie Award for his performance in the 1993 play The Lights, written by Howard Korder.

== Career ==
He has starred in several Broadway and Off-Broadway roles including the original Vince in Sam Shepard's Buried Child, Mihai in Mad Forest produced by the Manhattan Theatre Club Stage, Richard III at Theater at St. Clement's Church, and Dr. Miklos Nyiszli in The Grey Zone at the MCC Theater. In 1994, McCann was nominated for a Drama Desk Award and won an Obie Award for his performance in The Lights at Lincoln Center Theater.

His television credits include Law & Order, Numb3rs, Now and Again, and Miami Vice, while his film credits include American Violet, Acts of Worship, The Repair Shop,, Macbeth in Manhattan and Minyan.

He teaches in the Professional Actor Training Program at State University of New York at Purchase.

== Filmography ==
=== Film ===
Year	Title	Role	Notes
1998	Fiona	Kassem	
1999	Macbeth in Manhattan	Derek / Duncan	
2001	Acts of Worship	Jack	
2004	Mind the Gap	Cabbie	
2005	Buy It Now	Peter	
2005	The Notorious Bettie Page	Dr. Henry	
2007	Neal Cassady	Hank Anderson	
2008	Afterschool	Dr. Ullman	
2008	American Violet	Joel Fisher	
2009	Kill Daddy Good Night	Freund von Mimi	
2012	The Magic of Belle Isle	Bookstore Owner	
2013	All That I Am	Dr. Lynn	
2013	Bluebird	Lyman	
2014	God's Pocket	Brookie Sutherland	
2014	God Help the Girl	Cooking Flatmate	
2015	Anesthesia	Dr. Keller	
2015	Chronic	Robert	
2020	Minyan	Herschel	

=== Television ===
Year	Title	Role	Notes
1986	Rockabye	Candyman	Television film
1988	Miami Vice	FBI Agent Sam Russell	Episode: "Love at First Sight"
1991–2009	Law & Order	Various roles	5 episodes
1997	Path to Paradise: The Untold Story of the World Trade Center Bombing	Ahmed Ajaj	Television film
1999	Law & Order: Special Victims Unit	David Kelp	Episode: "Stocks & Bondage"
2000	Now and Again	Reverend Kelso	Episode: "Disco Inferno"
2004	Strip Search	Nicholas Hudson	Television film
2006	Numbers	Dr. Brewer	Episode: "Traffic"
2006	Haskett's Chance	Ben Rafferty	Television film
2007	Damages	Bruce Marx	Episode: "Blame the Victim"
2009	The Good Wife	Howard Brightman	Episode: "Lifeguard"
2011	Unforgettable	Thad Ralston	Episode: "Check Out Time"
2011	Boardwalk Empire	Mortician	Episode: "Battle of the Century"
2013	Elementary	Dr. Del Santo	Episode: "The Woman"
