= Eisenstein in Guanajuato =

2015 film

- Theatrical release poster
- Directed by: Peter Greenaway
- Written by: Peter Greenaway
- Produced by: San Fu Maltha; Cristina Velasco; Femke Wolting
- Starring: Elmer Bäck; Luis Alberti; Maya Zapata; Lisa Owen; Stelio Savante
- Cinematography: Reinier van Brummelen
- Edited by: Elmer Leupen
- Production companies: Fu Works; VPRO; Yle; ZDF/Arte
- Distributed by: Cinemein (Netherlands); Piano (Mexico); B-Plan Distribution (Finland); Pyramide Distribution (France)
- Release dates: 11 February 2015 (Berlin); 18 June 2015 (Netherlands); 8 July 2015 (France); 4 September 2015 (Finland); 22 January 2016 (Mexico)
- Running time: 105 minutes
- Countries: Netherlands; Mexico; Belgium; Finland; France
- Languages: English; Spanish
- Budget: €2.472 million; ($2.8 million)
- Box office: $78,542

Eisenstein in Guanajuato is a 2015 biographical film written and directed by Peter Greenaway. Starring Elmer Bäck as Soviet film director Sergei Eisenstein, alongside Stelio Savante, Lisa Owen, Maya Zapata, Luis Alberti, Jakob Öhrman, Rasmus Slätis, and Raino Ranta, the film is an international co-production among companies in the Netherlands, Mexico, Belgium, Finland, and France.

== Cast ==
- Elmer Bäck as Sergei Eisenstein
- Stelio Savante as Hunter S. Kimbrough
- Lisa Owen as Mary Craig Sinclair
- Maya Zapata as Concepción Cañedo
- Luis Alberti as Palomino Cañedo
- Jakob Öhrman as Eduard Tisse
- Rasmus Slätis as Grisha Alexandrov
- Raino Ranta as Meierhold
- América Rodríguez as La mera vena

== Release ==
Eisenstein in Guanajuato premiered at the 65th Berlin International Film Festival in the main competition section on 11 February 2015. The film was voted to the bottom place by the Screen International's critics’ jury and subsequently ignored by the official jury.

The film opened theatrically 18 June in the Netherlands, 8 July in France, 4 September in Finland, and 22 January 2016 in Mexico. It had a limited theatrical release in the United States on 5 February 2016.

=== Critical reception ===
The film received mixed reviews from critics. On Rotten Tomatoes, the film has a 55% score based on 38 reviews, with an average rating of 6/10. The site's consensus states: "Eisenstein in Guanajuato is certainly bold, but its provocations aren't always enough to overcome a lack of depth and clear narrative purpose." Metacritic reports a 60 out of 100 rating based on 16 critics, indicating "mixed or average reviews".

Critic and author David Robinson praised Greenaway's "post-modern pictorialism still as ingenious, flashy and painstakingly wrought in his seventies." He also criticised the film heavily for its salaciousness and many historical inaccuracies, stating that of Eisenstein's wife Pera Atasheva and his many friends, confidants and colleagues: "None of these would recognise the Eisenstein they knew in Greenaway’s Guanajuato."

== See also ==
- List of LGBT-related films of 2015
