= Strip Search (film) =

2004 American drama TV film

- Written by: Tom Fontana
- Directed by: Sidney Lumet
- Starring: Glenn Close; Maggie Gyllenhaal; Ken Leung; Bruno Lastra; Dean Winters; Austin Pendleton
- Theme music composer: Paul Chihara
- Country of origin: United States
- Original language: English

Production
- Producers: Mark A. Baker; Irene Burns
- Cinematography: Ron Fortunato
- Editor: Tom Swartwout
- Running time: 86 minutes (Germany); 56 minutes (U.S.)
- Production company: HBO Films

Original release
- Network: HBO
- Release: April 27, 2004

Strip Search is a drama film made for the HBO network, first aired on April 27, 2004. The film explores the status of individual liberties in the aftermath of the September 11 attacks and the approval of the USA PATRIOT Act. The film was directed by Sidney Lumet and written by Oz creator Tom Fontana. It stars Glenn Close, Maggie Gyllenhaal, Ken Leung, Bruno Lastra and Dean Winters. The film initially was screened at the Monaco International Film Festival with Lumet presenting it in the presence of Fontana.

Different cuts of the film exist. There is supposedly a two-hour version. German TV showed an 86-minute version. The version released on DVD in the U.S. is 56 minutes.

== Plot ==
The film is built around two main parallel stories, each containing almost identical dialogues. One story line involves Linda Sykes (Gyllenhaal), an American woman detained in the People's Republic of China, being interrogated by a military officer (Leung). In the other storyline, Sharif Bin Said (Lastra), an Arab man detained in New York City, is interrogated by two FBI agents (Winters and Close). Both characters are graduate students detained with no hard evidence and interrogated about unspecified activities which may or may not be related to terrorist plots.

In the course of the increasingly brutal interrogations, both Sykes and Bin Said are strip searched against their will by their interrogators and are subjected to a cavity search. In both cases the protagonists appear to have only tenuous connections with the suspected terrorist plots.

The film ends with the question: "Must security and safety come at the price of freedom?"

== Cast ==
- Glenn Close as Karen Moore
- Maggie Gyllenhaal as Linda Sykes
- Ken Leung as Liu Tsung-Yuan
- Bruno Lastra as Sharif Bin Said
- Dean Winters as Ned McGrath
- Peter Jacobson as John Scanlon
- Austin Pendleton as James Perley
- Tom Guiry as Gerry Sykes
- Fred Kohler as Jimmy Briggs
- Christopher McCann as Nicholas Hudson
- Nelson Lee as Xiu-Juan Chang
- Ramsey Faragallah as Abdul Amin
- Daniel May Wong as Arresting Officer
