= Amelia Campbell =

Canadian-born, American-raised actress

- Born: Amelia Campbell; August 4, 1965 (age 61); Montreal, Quebec, Canada
- Occupation: Actress
- Years active: 1988–present
- Spouse: Anthony Arkin
- Relatives: Alan Arkin, Father in Law

Amelia Campbell (born August 4, 1965) is a Canadian-born, American-raised actress. She was born in Montreal, Quebec, but grew up in Ithaca, New York. A stage and film actress, she has appeared in such films as The Paper, My Louisiana Sky, Single White Female, and Lorenzo's Oil.

== Personal life ==
Campbell was born in Montreal but grew up in Ithaca, New York. She graduated from Syracuse University in 1988. She is married to Anthony Arkin (b. 1967), son of Alan Arkin and younger brother of actor Adam Arkin.

== Career ==
In 1990, Campbell played a small role in The Exorcist III. In 1992 she played roles in Single White Female and Lorenzo's Oil. She appeared in Ron Howard's film The Paper in 1994. In 1999 she played Patty the stage manager in Macbeth in Manhattan, which was filmed in one of New York City's historic theatres.

In 2001 she played the role of Corinna Ramsey Parker in My Louisiana Sky, directed by her brother-in-law Adam Arkin. In 2008, she played Sandra Zeller in A Dog Year. She played Maggie Harmon in Tim Blake Nelson's 2010 film, Leaves of Grass, which starred Edward Norton.
