= Elmer Bäck =

Finnish actor

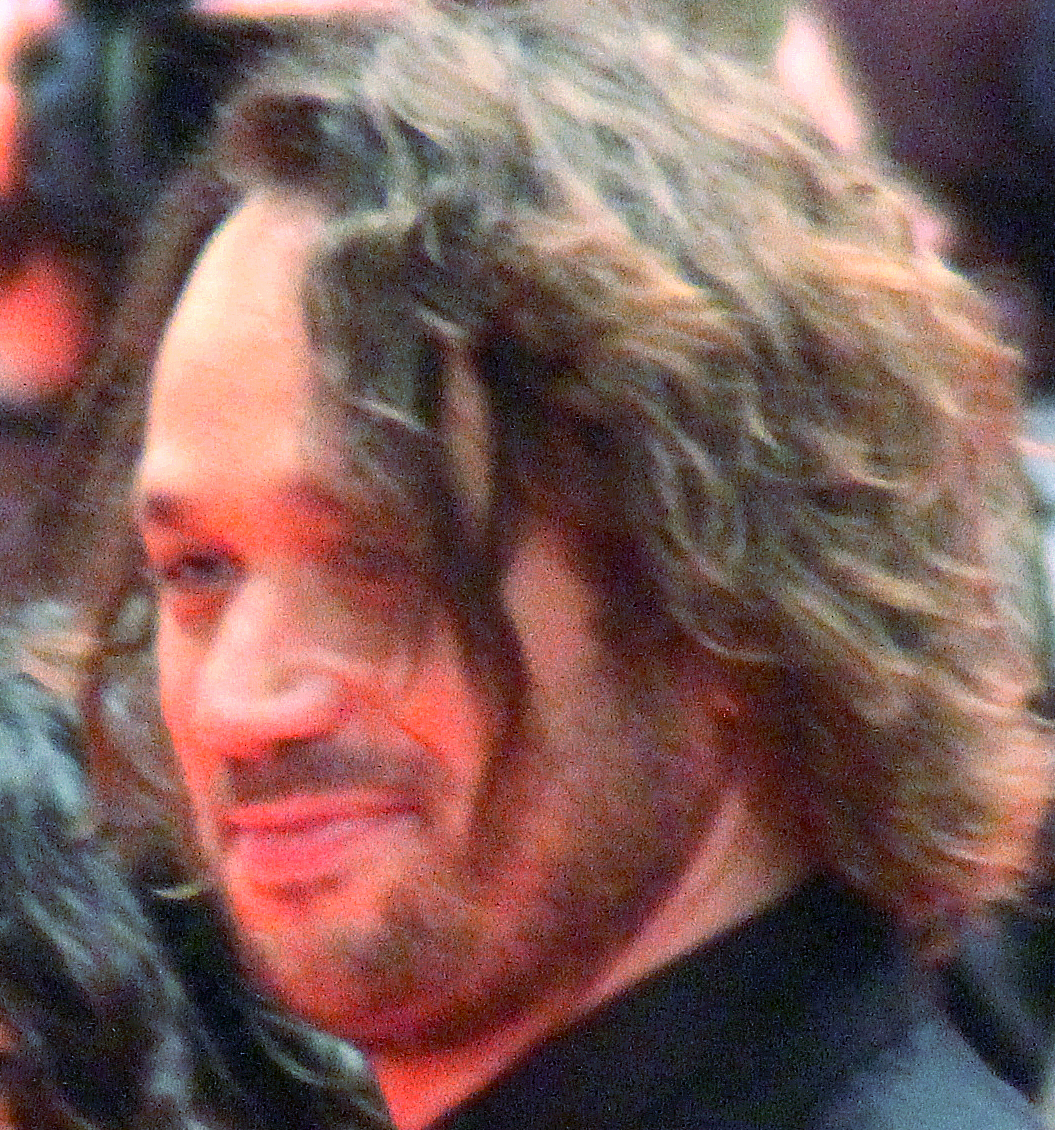
Elmer Bäck at the 2015 Berlin International Film Festival

Elmer Bäck (born 18 October 1981) is a Finnish actor who is best known for starring in a 2015 Peter Greenaway film Eisenstein in Guanajuato. He has been in theatrical productions, in movies and on television in Finland, and is part of the theatre group Nya Rampen, based in Berlin, Germany.

== Personal life ==
Bäck is a Swedish-speaking Finn. He married Brenda, a Mexican costume designer, in 2017. They had met during the production of Eisenstein in Guanajuato.

== Selected filmography ==
- Missä kuljimme kerran (2011)
- Eisenstein in Guanajuato (2015)
- Cold Courage (2020, TV series)
- The Last Ones (2020)
