= Minyan (film) =

2020 American drama film

- Film poster
- Directed by: Eric Steel
- Written by: Eric Steel; Daniel Pearle
- Based on: Minyan by David Bezmozgis
- Produced by: Luca Borghese; Luigi Caiola; Ben Howe
- Starring: Samuel H. Levine; Ron Rifkin; Christopher McCann; Brooke Bloom; Alex Hurt; Chris Perfetti
- Cinematography: Ole Bratt Birkeland
- Edited by: Ray Hubley
- Music by: David Krakauer; Kathleen Tagg
- Production companies: Easy There Tiger; AgX
- Distributed by: Salzgeber & Company Medien; Strand Releasing
- Release dates: February 17, 2020 (Berlinale); October 22, 2021 (IFC Center)
- Running time: 118 minutes
- Country: United States
- Language: English
- Box office: $11,451

Minyan is a 2020 American LGBT-related coming-of-age drama film written by Eric Steel and Daniel Pearle. It was directed by Eric Steel, in his feature film debut. It is based on a short story of the same name by David Bezmozgis. The film stars Samuel H. Levine, Ron Rifkin, Christopher McCann, Brooke Bloom, Alex Hurt, Chris Perfetti, and Mark Margolis in his final film role before his death in 2023. It had its world premiere at the 2020 Berlin International Film Festival and was nominated for Best Feature Film. It went on to screen at Los Angeles Outfest, where it won the Grand Jury Award for Outstanding U.S. Narrative Feature. The film was received favorably by critics.

== Synopsis ==
The film is set in the 1980s with David, the 17-year-old gay son of a Russian Jewish family in Brighton Beach, Brooklyn. He has a closer relationship with his widowed grandfather Josef, than he does with his parents; his dad frequently beats him and his mother is overbearing and constantly meddling in his life. She insists he go to a Jewish school, where he will not get beat up for being a Jew, instead of enrolling in public school, which David would rather go to. When his grandfather decides to downsize from his too big apartment to a smaller one in subsidized housing, he takes David along with him. After meeting the rabbi assigned to approve residency in the apartment block, Josef is approved after committing him and David to make up the quorum required for a Jewish prayer circle, also known as a minyan. There is also a closeted gay senior couple living there, Herschel and Itzik, whom the neighbors choose to view as friends, which David befriends. In one scene in the film, the building manager explains why he doesn't care that they live together: "Thieves, adulterers, homosexuals. I take them all, without them, we would never have our minyan". Now that David is living away from his parents, he can explore his sexuality more fully by cruising the parks and the local library, where young gay men hang out. One night he enters a gay bar for the first time where he meets Eric, who buys him drinks, and Bruno, the bartender. Bruno and David eventually have sex, while Bruno teaches David about the perils of AIDS that is just starting to spread through the gay community.

== Cast ==
- Samuel H. Levine as David
- Ron Rifkin as Josef
- Christopher McCann as Herschel
- Mark Margolis as Itzik
- Brooke Bloom as Rachel
- Alex Hurt as Bruno
- Chris Perfetti as Eric
- Zane Pais as Nathan
- Carson Meyer as Alicia
- Elizabeth Loyacano as Mrs. Namovsky

== Release ==
- Berlin International Film Festival (February 17, 2020, nominee - Best Feature Film)
- Los Angeles Outfest (August 13, 2020, winner - Grand Jury Award for Outstanding U.S. Narrative Feature)
- OUTshine Film Festival (August 28, 2020)
- Reeling: The Chicago LGBTQ+ International Film Festival (October 4, 2020)
- New York Lesbian, Gay, Bisexual, & Transgender Film Festival (October 16, 2020)
- IFC Center (October 22, 2021)
- Los Angeles and PVOD services (October 29, 2021)
- Cafritz Hall, Washington, D.C. (November 12, 2021)

== Critical reception ==
On the review aggregator website Rotten Tomatoes, 94% of 18 critics' reviews are positive, with an average rating of 6.4/10. Metacritic assigned the film an average weighted score of 68 out of 100, based on 11 critics, indicating "generally favorable reviews".

Peter Debruge of Variety said it is a "subtle film, so understated at times that Steel's intentions may escape audiences entirely". He praised Samuel Levine for his performance saying, he is an "emerging talent known only to theater audiences at the moment...but Minyan makes clear that we are dealing with a performer of uncommon gifts". Jude Dry wrote in their review for Indie Wire, that "Josef and David's relationship...provides some of the film's most charming moments...in no small part to the delightful Ron Rifkin and Levine...who carries it all off with a smoldering finesse". They also noted the "pretty hot sex scenes" between David and Bruno the bartender. David Rooney from The Hollywood Reporter praised the performances, especially old-timers Rifkin and Topol, saying they "convey a lot while saying relatively little". He also complimented Levine for his portrayal of David as being "consistently compelling, vulnerable, nervous and frequently defensive yet hungry for human contact that will feed his self-knowledge". Brian Bromberger from the Bay Area Reporter was also impressed with Ron Rifkin saying he "radiates" in his role as the grandfather, and said this is Levine's "stunning breakout role".

The Forward said the film "elevates a slice of Jewish experience that rarely makes it onto the big screen". They concluded that Levine is the one "who carries the film", and the movie succeeds by letting his character "stumble uninterrupted toward adulthood". Kyle Amato wrote in his review for Boston Hassle that Steel's feature film debut is "confident" and Levine is the "perfect avatar for Steel's intentions; his face can shift with such subtlety and speed, his emotional devastation could go entirely unnoticed by those around him while the audience sees into his soul". Jonathan Christian from The Playlist graded the movie a D+. He said Levine is a "talent to keep an eye on" and Rifkin "delivers a commendable performance". But the film "cannot earn much more than a participation trophy...and under Steel's direction, the film regrettably fails to impress".

== See also ==
- List of LGBT-related films of 2020
