= No Bananas =

British television series

No Bananas is a 10-episode television miniseries that aired on BBC1 between 5 May and 14 July 1996. It is set in England during World War II. The cast was led by Alison Steadman, Michael Elwyn and Stephanie Beacham.
