= Sundown (2021 film) =

2021 film by Michel Franco

- Theatrical release poster
- Directed by: Michel Franco
- Written by: Michel Franco
- Produced by: Michel Franco; Cristina Velasco; Eréndira Núñez Larios
- Starring: Tim Roth; Charlotte Gainsbourg; Iazua Larios
- Cinematography: Yves Cape
- Edited by: Óscar Figueroa; Michel Franco
- Production companies: Teorema; CommonGround Pictures; Luxbox; Film I Väst
- Distributed by: Videocine Entretenimiento (Mexico); Ad Vitam Distribution (France); Lucky Dogs (Sweden)
- Release dates: 5 September 2021 (Venice); 28 January 2022 (United States)
- Running time: 83 minutes
- Countries: Mexico; France; Sweden
- Languages: English; Spanish
- Box office: $1 million

Sundown is a 2021 drama film written and directed by Michel Franco. It stars Tim Roth, Charlotte Gainsbourg and Iazua Larios. The plot follows a wealthy man (Roth) who attempts to abandon his family on vacation after the death of his mother. The film had its world premiere at the Venice Film Festival on 5 September 2021, and was released in the United States by Bleecker Street on 28 January 2022. The film was met with generally positive reviews.

== Plot ==
Neil Bennett, a quiet man from London, is on vacation in Acapulco with his sister Alice and her two children, Colin and Alexa. The family, who made their fortune in the meat-processing industry, stays at a luxurious hotel and eat at fancy restaurants. Day after day, the family participates in a variety of fun activities. Neil, however, is not having fun. Alice receives a phone call informing her that her and Neil's mother is in the hospital. Immediately, the family prepares to go home. On the way to the airport, Alice receives a second call informing her that their mother has died. Alice bursts into tears while Neil remains calm. At the airport, Neil falsely claims he left his passport at the hotel, and the rest of the family departs without him.

Neil decides to stay in Acapulco, at least for the next few days. He befriends a taxi driver named Jorge Campos, who takes him to a small hotel. Neil passes the time eating at cheap restaurants and visiting the beach. He ignores Alice's requests to come home and starts dating a friendly local named Berenice. He returns to his room one day to find his belongings are missing, presumably stolen, but shows no emotion. The next day, he witnesses a shooting yet remains apathetic.

Alice returns to Acapulco and confronts Neil for abandoning her during a hard time. After talking about the family business, Neil signs a document relinquishing his assets and inheritance in the presence of the family lawyer, Richard. Later, Alice is shot and killed by common criminals driven by Jorge. The police arrest Neil, believing he ordered the assassination. Neil bursts into tears upon learning about his sister's death. His representatives arrive and tell him that the company is now his. After Richard gets him out of prison, Neil returns to his hotel room. He continues seeing Berenice and spending time at the beach. Richard, Colin, and Alexa confront him in his room. Alexa hits Neil in the head with a glass bottle. Later, Neil signs off the rights to the family company to Colin and Alexa. Neil, in return, will receive a monthly pension and £100,000 as a down payment. After the meeting, Neil returns to Berenice.

A few days later, Neil falls down a set of stairs. Berenice takes him to the hospital, where she learns Neil has brain cancer. After Berenice falls asleep by his side, Neil abandons her and walks down the streets of Mexico City alone at night. The film abruptly cuts from his sad face to the sounds of the beach's waves the following morning, the glaring sunshine, and the clothes and shoes Neil was wearing the previous night, left unattended on his chair with a beer nearby.

== Cast ==
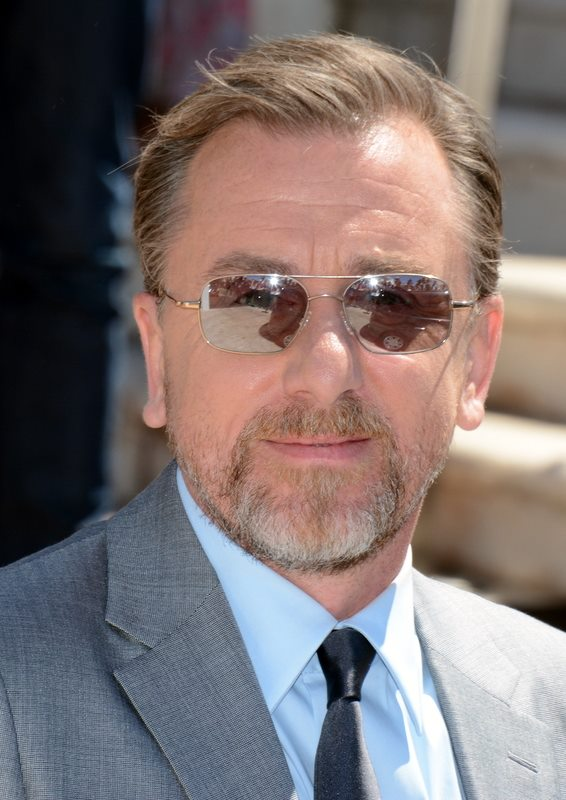
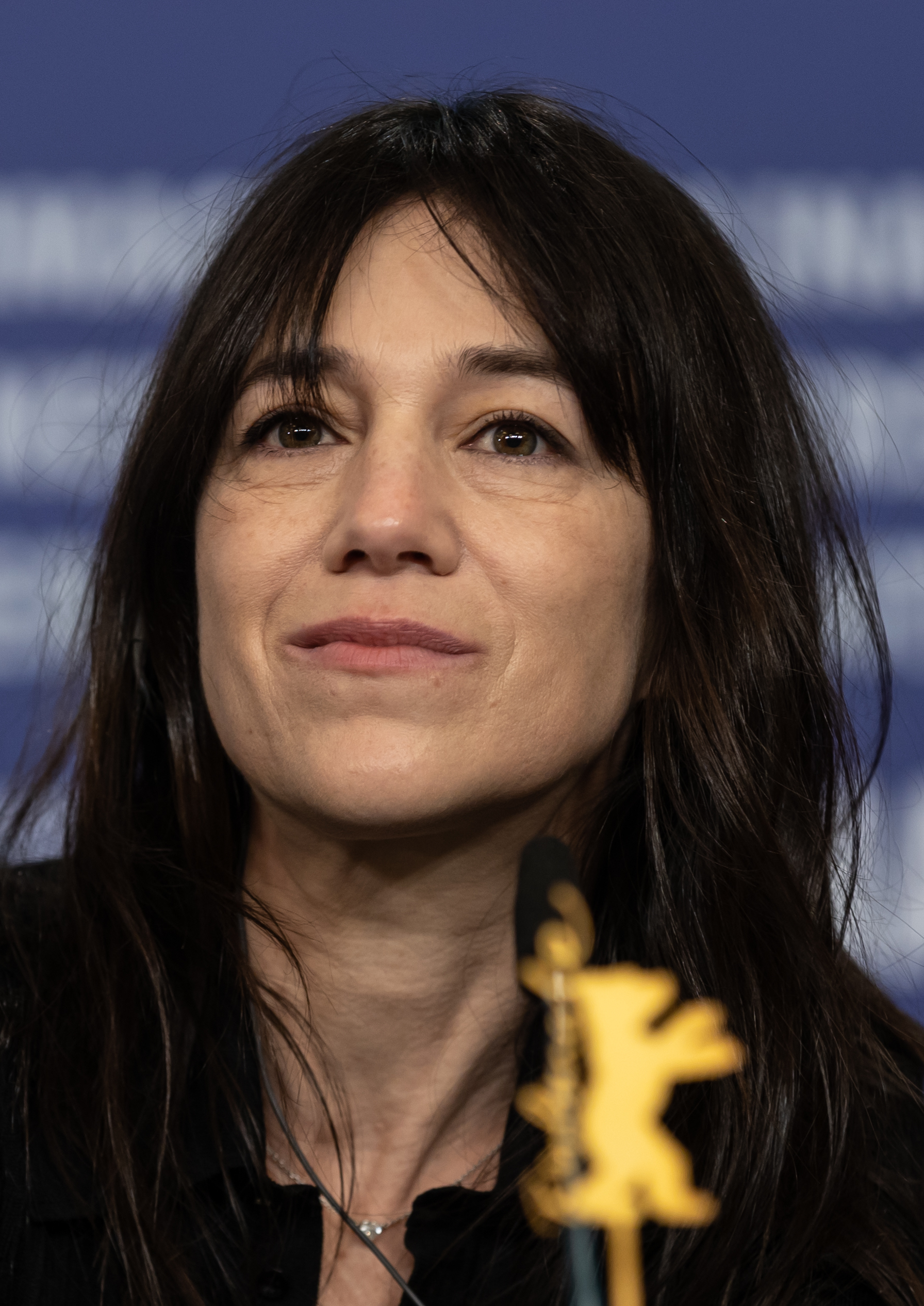
Tim Roth and Charlotte Gainsbourg play Neil and Alice Bennett
- Tim Roth as Neil Bennett
- Charlotte Gainsbourg as Alice Bennett
- Iazua Larios as Berenice
- Henry Goodman as Richard
- Albertine Kotting McMillan as Alexa Bennett
- Samuel Bottomley as Colin Bennett
- Jesús Godínez as Jorge 'Campos' Saldaña

== Production ==
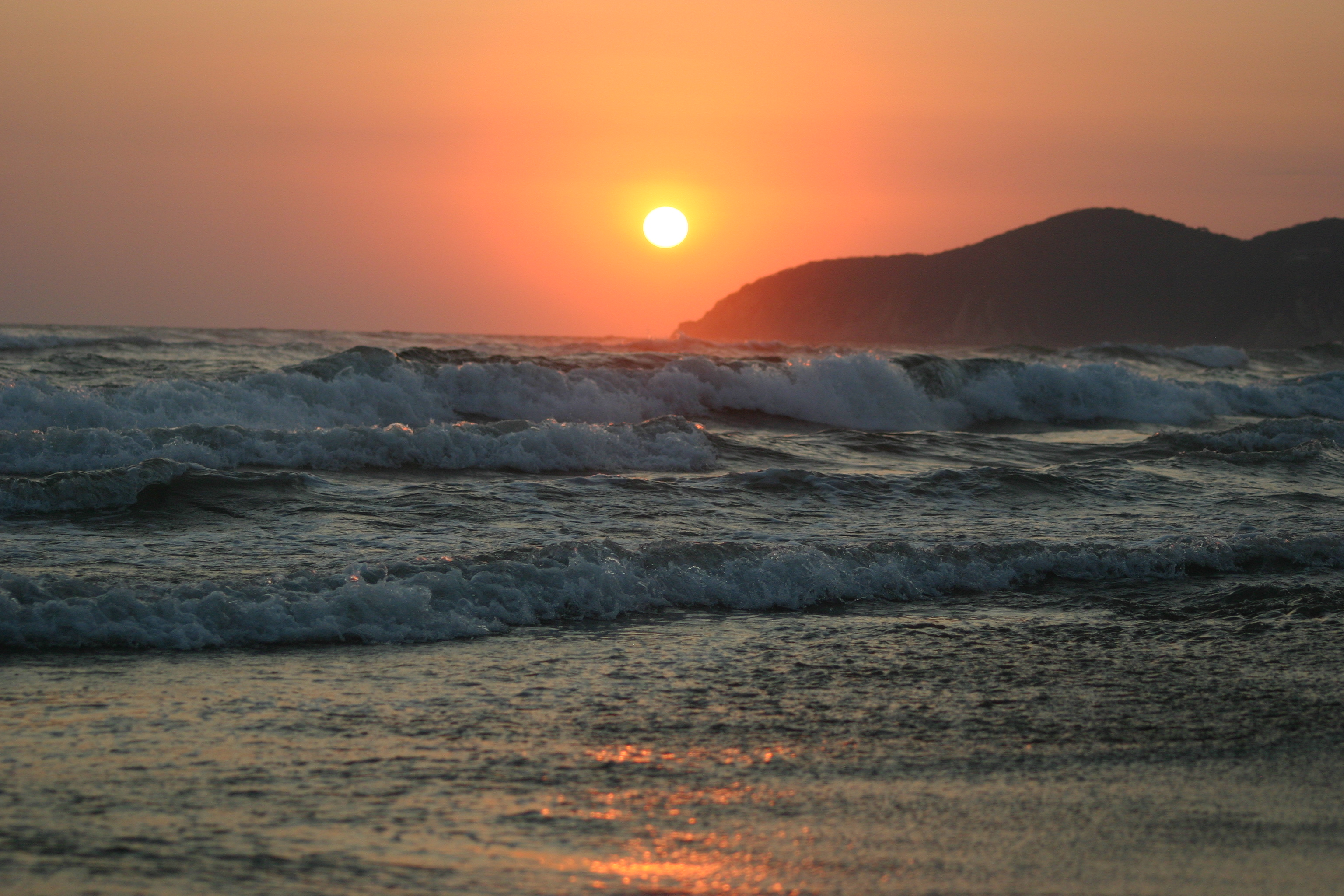
The film was shot in Acapulco, Mexico.

In July 2021, Tim Roth and Charlotte Gainsbourg were announced to star with Mexican filmmaker Michel Franco writing and directing. Roth and Franco had previously worked together on the 2015 releases 600 Miles and Chronic. According to Franco, he wrote the screenplay for the film fairly quickly before he turned 40 while going through a personal crisis. He sent it to Roth, who was immediately on board with the idea.

The film was shot on location in Acapulco and Mexico City. For the beach scenes, the production decided against closing down a real beach and hiring extras; instead, they shot on a crowded public beach. Franco said that was "the right way to do it because Acapulco is a character in itself. I want to capture that. I shoot in chronological order so I am also changing the story or certain details while I'm shooting and editing."

According to Roth, he came up with the idea of making slaughterhouses the primary source of the Bennett family's wealth after driving through New Mexico with his family: "I was on a road trip ... and there was this horrible smell. We drove another few miles and suddenly on each side of the road were these vast pens crammed with cattle: just crammed in, with slaughterhouses on one side and this massive machine to kill these animals to process them." Roth's character was influenced by the family of billionaire Rupert Murdoch. The actor said a major aspect of the film was putting his undisturbed character in dangerous circumstances so "the audience has to make up their minds about what that says about him. And why." He also said he liked the film's original title, Driftwood, because it defined who his character was; a wandering, uncaring, and sometimes oblivious man impacting the people around him. Iazua Larios, who plays Berenice, said the film was an exploration of people in different social classes "finding love and communicating in a strange way."

== Release ==
The film had its world premiere at the Venice Film Festival on 5 September 2021. It was also screened at the Toronto International Film Festival in September 2021. In October 2021, Bleecker Street acquired the film's distribution rights. Sundown was theatrically released in the United States on 28 January 2022. The film was screened in six theaters in New York and Los Angeles in its opening weekend that included Q&A sessions with Franco.

The film was released for Blu-ray and DVD on May 27, 2022.

== Reception ==
=== Box office ===
Sundown grossed $229,922 in the United States and Canada, and $794,764 in other territories, for a worldwide total of $1 million.

In the United States and Canada, the film earned $21,930 from six theaters in its opening weekend, and $113,607 in its second. After expanding to 181 theaters, the film made $21,173 in its third weekend, and $1,040 (for a per screen average of $5) in its fourth. Outside the US and Canada, the film was released in Russia and the Commonwealth of Independent States ($80,069), Spain ($27,795), and Slovenia ($596).

=== Critical response ===
On the review aggregator website Rotten Tomatoes, 77% of 115 critics' reviews are positive, with an average rating of 7.2/10. The website's consensus reads: "Sundown's emotionally muted wavelength may be difficult for some viewers to tune into, but it's enlivened by Tim Roth's strong central performance." Metacritic, which uses a weighted average, assigned the film a score of 70 out of 100, based on 27 critics, indicating "generally favorable" reviews.

Roth received critical acclaim for his performance. Xan Brooks of The Guardian gave the film five stars out of five, calling it "pitiless and pitch-perfect, an existential tour-de-force with shades of Albert Camus's The Outsider." Writing for San Francisco Chronicle, Mick LaSalle said Sundown's greatest achievement "is harder to explain. It's an inward-looking film that seems to be saying something about life. Whatever it's saying — and it's not clear that it's saying anything specific — it connects. It's not just another good movie. Somehow, it all adds up as something more important." South Korean filmmaker Bong Joon-ho listed it among his favorite films of 2021.
