= Tim Roth =

English actor (born 1961)

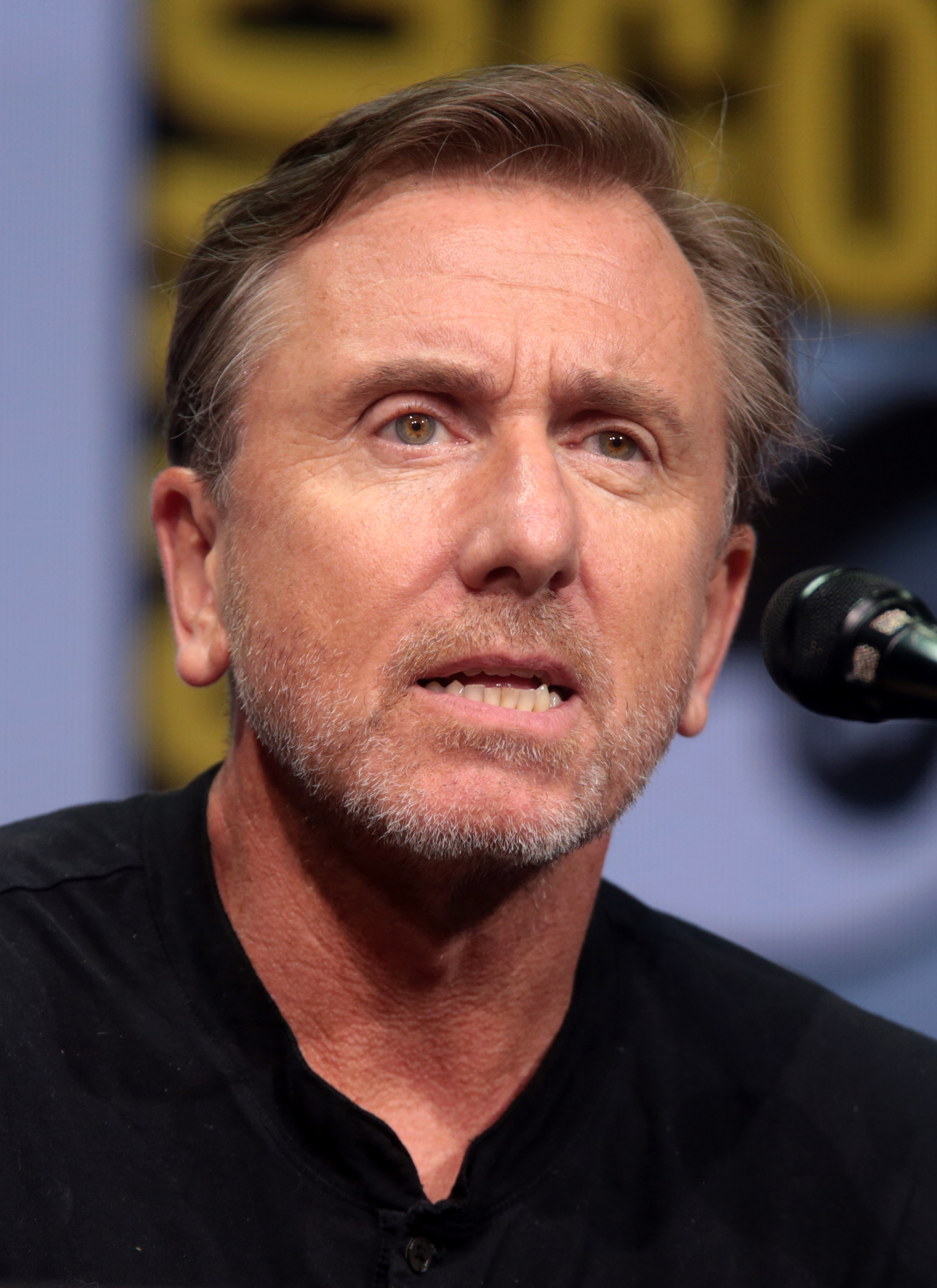
- Roth at the 2017 San Diego Comic-Con
- Born: Timothy Simon Roth; 14 May 1961 (age 65); Dulwich, London, England
- Occupations: Actor; director; producer
- Years active: 1982–present
- Works: Full list
- Spouse: Nikki Butler (m. 1993)
- Children: 3

Timothy Simon Roth (/rɒθ/; born 14 May 1961) is an English actor. A prominent member of the Brit Pack group, his accolades include a BAFTA Award, as well as nominations for an Academy Award and a Golden Globe Award.

After garnering attention in television productions Made in Britain (1983) and Meantime (1983), Roth was nominated for the BAFTA Award for Most Promising Newcomer in his theatrical film debut The Hit (1984). He gained further recognition for his roles in films, including The Cook, the Thief, His Wife & Her Lover (1989), Vincent & Theo, and Rosencrantz & Guildenstern Are Dead (both 1990).

Roth has collaborated with Quentin Tarantino on several films, including Reservoir Dogs (1992), Pulp Fiction (1994), Four Rooms (1995), and The Hateful Eight (2015). For his performance in Rob Roy (1995), he won the BAFTA Award for Best Actor in a Supporting Role, and was nominated for the Academy Award and the Golden Globe Award in the same category. Other film credits include The Legend of 1900 (1998), Planet of the Apes (2001), Funny Games (2007), Selma (2014), Luce (2019), and Bergman Island (2021).

Roth made his directorial debut with the film The War Zone (1999). He played Cal Lightman on the Fox series Lie to Me (2009–11), Jim Worth / Jack Devlin on the Sky Atlantic series Tin Star (2017–20), and Emil Blonsky / Abomination in the Marvel Cinematic Universe, including the films The Incredible Hulk (2008), Shang-Chi and the Legend of the Ten Rings (2021), and the Disney+ series She-Hulk: Attorney at Law (2022).

== Early life and education ==
Timothy Simon Roth was born in Dulwich, London on 14 May 1961. His mother, Ann, was a painter and teacher. His father, Ernie, was a Fleet Street journalist and painter. His father was born in Sheepshead Bay, Brooklyn, to a family of Irish descent. Although he was not of Jewish background, his father changed his surname from "Smith" to the German/Yiddish "Roth" in the 1940s, as "an act of anti-Nazi solidarity". Roth's father was a World War II veteran.

Roth is a survivor of child sexual abuse, committed by his paternal grandfather, whom he has stated sexually abused him from childhood until his early teen years. He first revealed that he was a victim of sexual abuse during press for the 1999 film The War Zone, which dealt with the topics of incest and sexual violence within a family, but declined to name the perpetrator at that time. In December 2016, he gave an interview to The Guardian in which he said that his abuser was his grandfather, who had also abused his father when he was a child.

Roth attended school in Lambeth before moving to Croydon Technical School, due to bullying. He attended the Strand School in Tulse Hill. Roth wanted to be a sculptor and studied at London's Camberwell College of Arts.

== Career ==
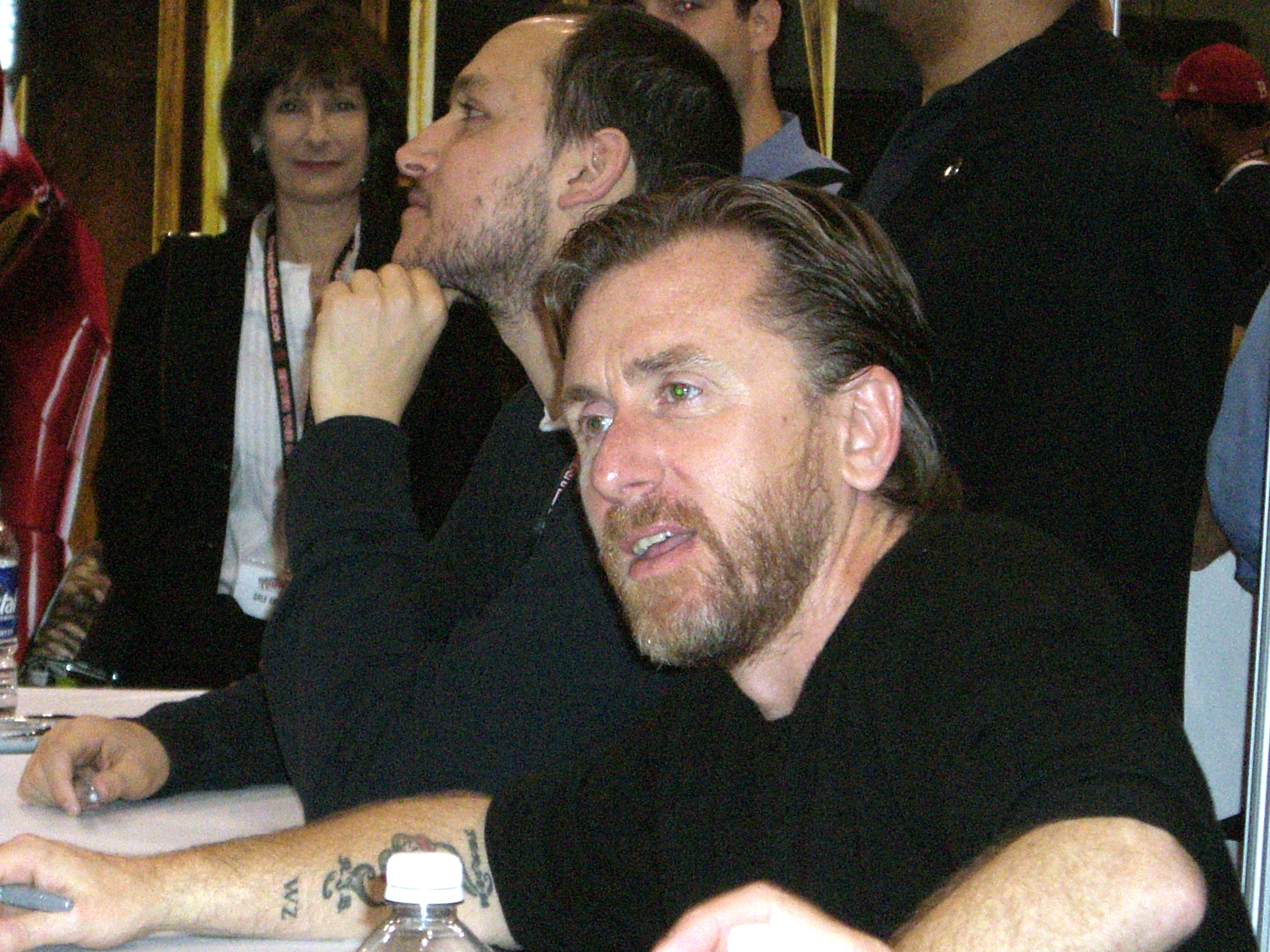
Roth at the 2008 Marvel booth signing

Roth starred in television films in the 1980s, including Made in Britain, Meantime, and Murder with Mirrors. After his film debut The Hit, he earned an Evening Standard Award for Most Promising Newcomer. He played an East End character in King of the Ghetto, a controversial drama based on a novel by Farukh Dhondy set in Brick Lane and broadcast by the BBC in 1986. Roth, Gary Oldman, Colin Firth, Daniel Day-Lewis, Bruce Payne, and Paul McGann were dubbed the Brit Pack.

In 1990, he played Vincent van Gogh in Vincent & Theo, and Guildenstern in Rosencrantz & Guildenstern Are Dead.

Roth became an international star when he collaborated with Quentin Tarantino on several films, including Reservoir Dogs, Pulp Fiction, Four Rooms, and The Hateful Eight.

He played Archibald Cunningham in Rob Roy. He won the BAFTA Award for Best Actor in a Supporting Role, and was nominated for an Academy Award and a Golden Globe Award in the same category. Roth starred in Woody Allen's musical film Everyone Says I Love You and in The Legend of 1900. He also co-starred with Tupac Shakur in the film Gridlock'd. Roth made his directorial debut film The War Zone, a film version of Alexander Stuart's novel. In 2001, he played General Thade the evil chimpanzee in Tim Burton's Planet of the Apes. For the Harry Potter film series, Roth declined the role of Severus Snape, which went to Alan Rickman.

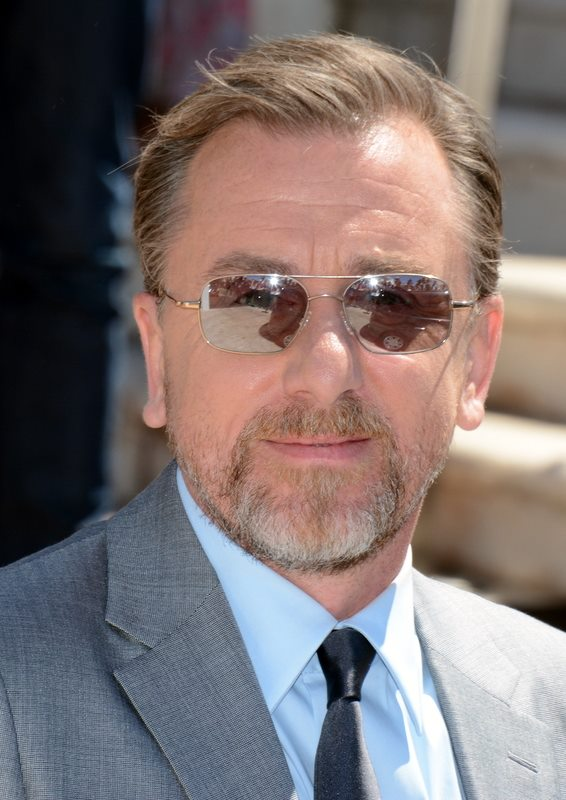
Roth at the 2014 Cannes Film Festival

Roth starred in Francis Ford Coppola's film Youth Without Youth, Michael Haneke's Funny Games, and played Emil Blonsky / Abomination, a Russian-born officer in the British Royal Marine Commandos, in The Incredible Hulk. Louis Leterrier was a fan of Roth's work. Leterrier wrote on Empire magazine: "it's great watching a normal Cockney boy become a superhero!". Roth starred in the television series Lie to Me as Cal Lightman, an expert on body language assisting local and federal law organisations with crime. A fan of Monty Python since his youth, Roth appeared in the 2009 television documentary, Monty Python: Almost the Truth (Lawyers Cut). He appeared on the cover of Manic Street Preachers' 2010 studio album, Postcards from a Young Man.

In 2012, he became the president of the jury for the Un Certain Regard section at the 2012 Cannes Film Festival. He starred as FIFA President Sepp Blatter in United Passions, a film about football's governing body, released in 2014, to coincide with FIFA's 110th anniversary, and the 2014 FIFA World Cup. Roth played Oswaldo Mobray in the ensemble western film The Hateful Eight, and played a butler in a deleted scene for the film Once Upon a Time in Hollywood.

Roth starred in the 2015 film Chronic which had a limited release. He received an Independent Spirit Award for Best Male Lead nomination. Roth collaborated with director Michel Franco again, in 2021, when he starred in Sundown. Roth was also an executive producer on Franco's film April's Daughter (2017).

In 2017, Roth appeared in five episodes of the third season of Twin Peaks. Roth also starred in British crime drama Tin Star, which ran from 2017 to 2020.

Roth reprised his role as Emil Blonsky / Abomination in the film Shang-Chi and the Legend of the Ten Rings (2021), and in the Disney+ series She-Hulk: Attorney at Law (2022), both set in the Marvel Cinematic Universe.

In 2022, Roth starred in the psychological horror film Resurrection. The same year he also appeared in New Zealand sports drama, Punch. In 2023, Roth appeared in 10 episodes of the Australian drama, Last King of the Cross.

In 2025, Roth starred in the British thriller Tornado. He is due to appear in historical crime drama The Immortal Man, a continuation of the British television series Peaky Blinders.

== Personal life ==
Roth's son Jack, born to Lori Baker in 1984, is also an actor. Roth married Nikki Butler in 1993. They reside in Pasadena. They had two sons, Timothy Hunter and Michael Cormac, named for Hunter S. Thompson and Cormac McCarthy respectively. On 16 October 2022, Cormac, a musician, died aged 25 from germ cell cancer.

=== Political views ===
As of 2008, Roth was a supporter of the Green Party of England and Wales. Roth protested against the Iraq War and later criticised former Prime Minister Tony Blair for his involvement, stating: "I've always felt Blair should be hauled off in handcuffs and put in Wormwood Scrubs. I think he's profited from the death of Reg's son and the Iraq war. I think that's where he belongs... I have nothing but contempt for him." He endorsed Senator Bernie Sanders for President in the 2016 United States presidential election. Roth was critical of Donald Trump's victory in 2016, saying: "I hate Trump. I hate everything that he stands for."

== See also ==
- List of Academy Award winners and nominees from Great Britain
- List of actors with Academy Award nominations
- List of British actors
- List of people from Pasadena, California
