= Michel Franco =

Mexican film director

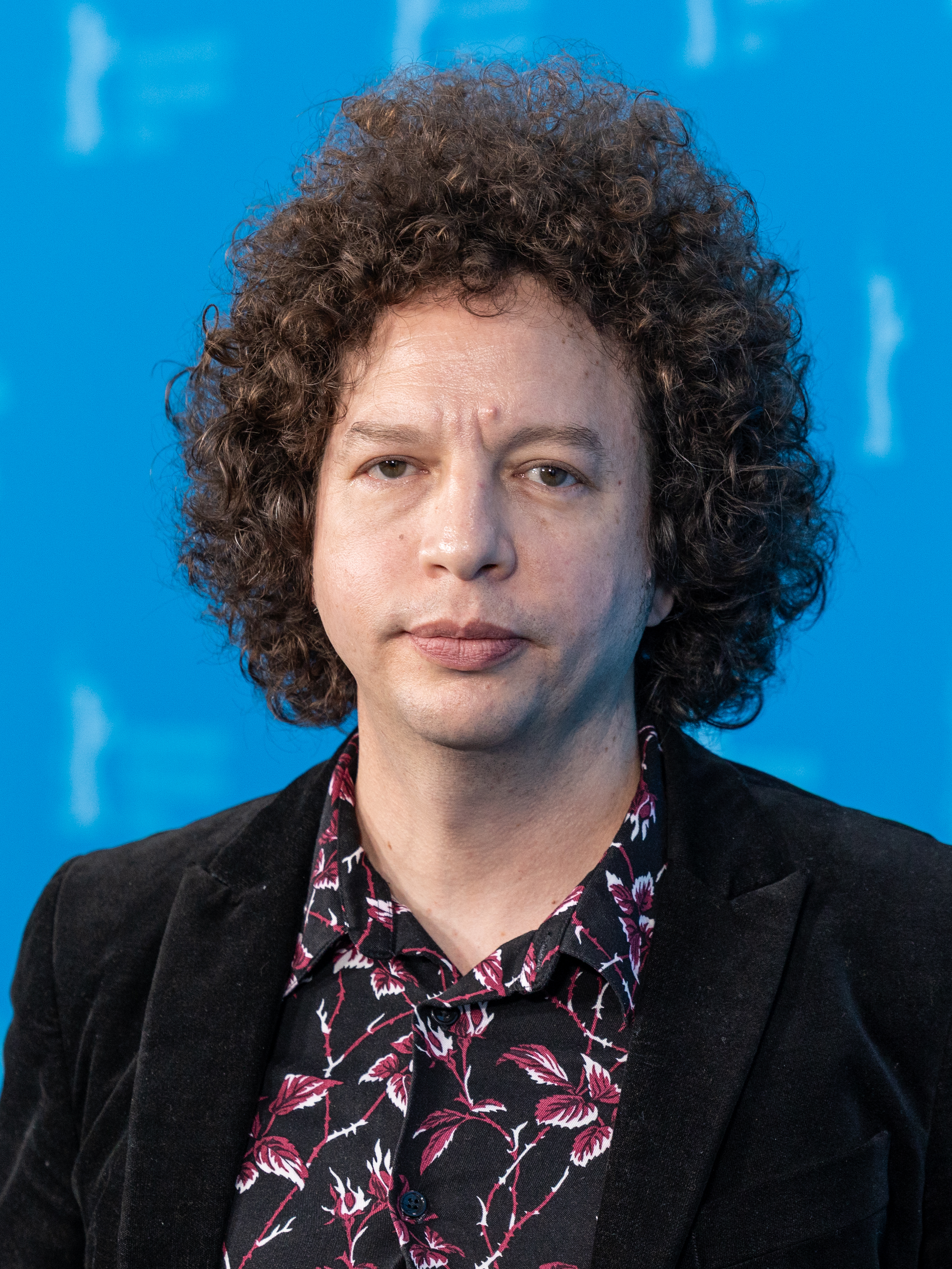
- Franco in 2025
- Born: 28 August 1979 (age 47); Mexico City, Mexico
- Occupations: Filmmaker, producer
- Years active: 2003-present

Michel Franco (born 28 August 1979) is a Mexican filmmaker. His films typically deal with themes of dysfunctional families.

He is most known for his film After Lucia (2012), that won the Prize Un Certain Regard at the 65th Cannes Film Festival.

== Career ==
His debut feature film Daniel & Ana (2009) had its world premiere in the Director's Fortnight section of the 62nd Cannes Film Festival.

His following film After Lucia (2012) won the Prize Un Certain Regard at the 65th Cannes Film Festival. It was also selected as the Mexican entry for the Best Foreign Language Oscar at the 85th Academy Awards, but it was not nominated. His third feature film Through the Eyes (2013) was co-directed with Victoria Franco, his sister.

Chronic (2015) marked his English-language debut, and stars Tim Roth. It had its world premiere in the main competition of the 68th Cannes Film Festival. It marked his only film selected to compete for the Palme d'Or.

April's Daughter (2017) had its world premiere in the Un Certain Regard section of the 70th Cannes Film Festival, where it won the section's Jury Prize.

His sixth feature film New Order (2020) had its world premiere in the main competition of the 77th Venice International Film Festival, where it won the Grand Jury Prize. It drew controversy and criticism towards its perceived racial stereotyping.

Sundown (2021) marked his second English-language feature and second collaboration with Tim Roth, had its world premiere in the main competition of the 78th Venice International Film Festival, where it was nominated for the Golden Lion.

Memory (2023) marked his first collaboration with Jessica Chastain, it had its world premiere at the main competition of the 80th Venice International Film Festival, where Peter Sarsgaard won the Volpi Cup for Best Actor.

He followed with Dreams (2025) also starring Chastain, which had its world premiere in the main competition of the 75th Berlin International Film Festival, where it was nominated for the Golden Bear.

=== Upcoming projects ===
His next feature film Circles, will mark his Hebrew-language debut, filmed in January 2025 and shot in black-and-white, set in the early 1950s, it follows siblings Shoshana and Meir Har-Zion, and their deep connection amid the cycle of violence between Arabs and Jews.

== Filmography ==
=== Feature films ===
Year	English title	Original title	Director	Writer	Producer	Editor	Notes
2009	Daniel & Ana		Yes	Yes	Associate	No	
2012	After Lucia	Después de Lucía	Yes	Yes	Yes	Yes	
2013	Through the Eyes	A los ojos	Yes	Yes	Yes	Yes	Co-directed with Victoria Franco
2015	Chronic		Yes	Yes	Yes	Yes	
2017	April's Daughter	Las hijas de abril	Yes	Yes	Yes	Yes	
2020	New Order	Nuevo orden	Yes	Yes	Yes	Yes	
2021	Sundown		Yes	Yes	Yes	Yes	
2023	Memory		Yes	Yes	Yes	Yes	
2025	Dreams		Yes	Yes	Yes	Yes	
TBA	Circles		Yes	Yes	Yes	Yes	Post-production

=== Producing credits ===
- 600 Miles (2015)
- From Afar (2015)
- The Heirs (2015)
- El Vendedor de Orquídeas (2016)
- Workforce (Mano de obra) (2019)
- On the Rocks (2020) (Producer: Teorema, Mexico)
- La Civil (2021) (Co-producer)
- The Box (2021)
- Heroic (2023)
- At Midnight (2023) (Executive producer)
