= Chronic (film) =

2015 film

- Film poster
- Directed by: Michel Franco
- Written by: Michel Franco
- Produced by: Michel Franco; Gina Kwon; Gabriel Ripstein; Moisés Zonana
- Starring: Tim Roth
- Cinematography: Yves Cape
- Edited by: Julio Perez IV
- Production companies: Stromboli Films; Vamonos Films
- Distributed by: Videocine (Mexico); Wild Bunch (France)
- Release dates: 22 May 2015 (Cannes); 21 October 2015 (France)
- Running time: 93 minutes
- Countries: Mexico; France
- Language: English

Chronic is a 2015 drama film written and directed by Michel Franco. The film stars Tim Roth, alongside a supporting cast featuring Bitsie Tulloch, Rachel Pickup, David Dastmalchian, Michael Cristofer, Tate Ellington, Nailea Norvind, Claire van der Boom, Maribeth Monroe, Robin Bartlett, and Sarah Sutherland.

== Plot ==
David is first seen in his car, waiting outside a house. A young woman leaves the house, gets in her car and drives off; David follows her. He is later seen looking at photos of Nadia Wilson on Facebook, the same person he was following.

We find that David is a nurse. His first patient is Sarah, who is dying of AIDS. He tenderly bathes and dresses her, and manages her daily activities; for example, sends her visiting family away when she needs rest and helping prepare meals for her.

He arrives at work one day to learn Sarah has died. He enters the bedroom where she has died, and cleans and dresses her one last time. He attends her funeral, where her niece asks him if he is free to discuss her aunt, but he declines. He is later in a bar where he gets into conversation with a recently engaged young girl. He tells her that he was married for 21 years, that his wife was called Sarah and that she died of AIDS.

David is reassigned to an elderly stroke victim, an architect named John. John comes to like David, who lets John watch pornographic movies on his laptop. David purchases books on architecture in a bookstore, telling the bookstore assistant that he is an architect, and presents John with a picture of a house (which John had designed) as a birthday gift.

David's boss, Robert, subsequently calls David into the agency, where he is fired as John's family is suing the agency for sexual harassment, due to John watching the pornographic movie and John having an erection whilst bathing. David denies the charges but admits to working extra shifts because he was attached to John. He tries to make one last visit but John’s daughter sends him away.

It is revealed that David had a young son who died with a terminal illness, and that the young girl that he was stalking (Nadia) is actually his daughter, who is studying medicine in college. David meets up with his daughter as well as his ex-wife, who has remarried but since divorced after four years.

David's friend (and former boss) Isaac gets him a job with Martha, who has cancer and needs support for chemotherapy appointments. She tells him she knows about the sexual harassment suit but hires him regardless. Martha’s cancer spreads and David helps her when she becomes sick. Martha lies to her daughter, telling her that her cancer is in remission. Martha then asks David if he will help her die; he refuses and she fires him. He subsequently comes to her house and injects her, leading to her death. He calls Isaac and reports Martha died of cardiac arrest.

David's next patient is Greg, a 16-year-old boy who uses a wheelchair. David is hired for one week, as Greg's regular caregiver is away. David briefly discusses Greg with Nadia. David is seen taking Greg to the park, where Greg swears at David. Later David goes for an outdoor run (he has been seen jogging both in the gym and outside during the movie) and whilst doing so is struck dead by a car. He appears to have glanced at the oncoming traffic before the accident.

== Cast ==
- Tim Roth as David Wilson
- Sarah Sutherland as Nadia Wilson
- Rachel Pickup as Sarah Holt
- Robin Bartlett as Martha
- Michael Cristofer as John Sterling
- David Dastmalchian as Bernard
- Bitsie Tulloch as Lidia
- Nailea Norvind as Laura
- Tate Ellington as Greg
- Claire van der Boom as Alice
- Christopher McCann as Robert
- Brenda Wehle as Mildred Sterling
- Kari Coleman as Sarah's sister
- Maribeth Monroe as Karen - Sarah's niece
- Joe Santos as Isaac Sr.

== Release ==
Chronic premiered at the 2015 Cannes Film Festival on 22 May 2015 and was selected to compete for the Palme d'Or at the 2015 Cannes Film Festival. At Cannes, Franco won the award for Best Screenplay.

== Reception ==
=== Critical response ===
The film received positive reviews from critics. As of December 2020, the film holds a 76% approval rating on review aggregator website Rotten Tomatoes, based on 59 reviews with an average rating of 6.7/10. The website's critical consensus reads: "Chronic demands patience from the viewer -- and yields rich dividends with an affecting story and a committed starring performance from Tim Roth." Metacritic reports a 69 out of 100 rating, based on 17 critics, indicating "generally favorable reviews".

=== Accolades ===
Award	Category	Recipient(s)	Result
Cannes Film Festival	Palme d'Or	Michel Franco	Nominated
Cannes Film Festival	Best Screenplay	Michel Franco	Won
Independent Spirit Awards	Best Feature	Michel Franco, Gina Kwon, Gabriel Ripstein & Moisés Zonana	Nominated
Independent Spirit Awards	Best Male Lead	Tim Roth	Nominated
